= Alexander Mikaberidze =

Georgian lawyer, author and historian (born 1978)

- Born: 27 January 1978 (age 48); Aktobe, Kazakh SSR, USSR
- Education: Tbilisi State University (JD); Florida State University (PhD)
- Occupations: historian, author and academic

Alexander Mikaberidze (Georgian: ალექსანდრე მიქაბერიძე; born 27 January 1978) is a Georgian lawyer, author and historian who specializes in Napoleonic studies. He is a full professor of history and social sciences at Louisiana State University in Shreveport, where he holds the Ruth Herring Noel Endowed Chair for the Curatorship of the James Smith Noel Collection, one of the largest private collections of antiquarian books, prints, and maps in the United States. In 2025, he was granted the Boyd Professorship, the highest and most prestigious academic rank awarded by Louisiana State University.

== Education and career ==
Mikaberidze was born in 1978 in Aktobe, Kazakh SSR, where his parents were then living. In 1990, he returned to the Georgian SSR, which gained independence in 1991.

He graduated from Tbilisi State University in 1999 with a degree in international law. From 1996 to 2000, he worked with the Ministry of Foreign Affairs of Georgia, where he handled human rights issues and relations with the Council of Europe.

== Napoleonic studies ==
Mikaberidze is a specialist on Napoleonic studies and the Napoleonic era. In 1999, Mikaberidze was one of the founding members of the Napoleonic Society of Georgia, dedicated to the study of the Revolutionary and Napoleonic eras (1799–1815). In 2000, he moved to the United States to devote himself to Napoleonic studies. Mikaberidze graduated with a Ph.D. in history in 2003 from the Institute on Napoleon and the French Revolution at Florida State University. He has taught at Florida State University and Mississippi State University, and lectured on strategy and policy at the U.S. Naval War College. Since 2007, he has been at Louisiana State University in Shreveport.

Mikaberidze has been the author, editor, and translator of over two dozen books and textbooks. His books The Russian Officer Corps in the Revolutionary and Napoleonic Wars, 1792–1815 and The Battle of Borodino: Napoleon versus Kutuzov won the Literary Award of the International Napoleonic Society for 2005 and 2007, respectively. His book, The Napoleonic Wars: A Global History, published by Oxford University Press in 2020, won the Gilder Lehrman Military History Prize and the Society for Military History's Distinguished Book Award in 2021. His latest book, Kutuzov: A Life in War and Peace, published by Oxford University Press in 2022, won the Society for Military History's Distinguished Book Award in 2023.

He is on the editorial boards of the international journal Napoleonica La Revue, "an online review which aims to promote research in the history of the First and Second French Empires". Napoleonica La Revue, "published by the Fondation Napoléon, is academic, multidisciplinary, international and peer-reviewed". He has served the editor-in-chief of the periodical The Napoleonic Scholarship and an editor of the Select Papers of the Consortium on the Revolutionary Era.

For his contributions to Napoleonic studies, Mikaberidze has been elected a Fellow of the Royal Historical Society of the United Kingdom, and awarded the International Napoleonic Society's Legion of Merit Medal and La Renaissance Française's Médaille d'or du Rayonnement Culturel.

== History of Islam ==
Alexander Mikaberidze edited Conflict and Conquest in the Islamic World: A Historical Encyclopedia, a two-volume encyclopedia covering the military and political history of Islam, and published in 2011.

The encyclopedia contains more than 600 entries from dozens of contributors, as well as a glossary, maps and photographs.

== Notable works ==
- The Louisiana Purchase: The Grand Bargain and the Making of America. New York: Oxford University Press. 2026. ISBN 9780197548141.
- (Editor) Alexander von Benckendorff's Memoirs of A Soldier and Statesman. Volume 1: 1802-1819. Tbilisi: Artanuji. 2026. ISBN 9789941527395.
- თბილისი: XVII საუკუნის გზამკვლევი ჟან შარდენის მიხედვით. Tbilisi: Artanuji. 2025.
- (Editor) Winning the Peace? Napoleonic Governance and the Integration of Europe. New York: Palgrave Macmillan. 2025. ISBN 9783031964664.
- (Editor) The Cambridge History of the Napoleonic Wars: Volume 2, Fighting the Napoleonic Wars. Cambridge: Cambridge University Press. 2023. ISBN 9781108417662.
- (Editor) The Memoirs of a Russian Artilleryman. The Invasion of France, 1814. London: Pen&Sword. 2025.
- (Editor) The Memoirs of a Russian Artilleryman. The German Liberation War of 1813. London: Pen&Sword. 2023.
- (Editor) The Memoirs of a Russian Artilleryman. The Russian Campaign of 1812. London: Pen&Sword. 2023.
- (Editor) Confronting Napoleon: Levin von Bennigsen's Memoir of the Campaign in Poland, 1806–1807. Volume I – Pultusk to Eylau. London: Helion. 2022. ISBN 9781915070449.
- Las Guerras Napoleónicas. Una historia global. Madrid: Desperta Ferro. 2022. ISBN 9788412483055.
- Napoleon's Hollow Victory: Berezina 1812. London: Osprey. 2022. ISBN 9781472850188.
- Kutuzov: A Life in War and Peace. Oxford: Oxford University Press. 2022. ISBN 9780197546734.
- ნაპოლეონის მარშლები [Napoleon's Marshals]. Tbilisi: Artanuji Press. 2022.
- Les guerres napoléoniennes: Une histoire globale. Paris: Flammarion. 2020.
- The Napoleonic Wars: A Global History. London: Oxford University Press. 2020. ISBN 978-0-19-995106-2.
- ნაპოლეონი: 51 კითხვა-პასუხი [51 Questions about Napoleon]. Tbilisi: Artanuji Press. 2020.
- ქართველები უცხოელთა თვალით (XV–XVII საუკუნეები) [Georgians through Foreign Eyes (XV–XVII centuries)]. Tbilisi: Artanuji Press. 2018. ISBN 978-9941-478-15-4.
- საქართველო უცხოელთა თვალით (XV–XVII საუკუნეები) [Georgia through Foreign Eyes (XV–XVII centuries]. Tbilisi: Artanuji Press. 2018. ISBN 978-9941-478-26-0.
- უცხოეთში დაკარგული ქართველები [Georgians Lost in the Foreign Lands]. Tbilisi: Artanuji Press. 2017. ISBN 978-9941-463-51-8.
- Russian Eyewitness Accounts of the Campaign of 1807. London: Frontline Books. 2015. ISBN 978-1-84832-762-7.
- The Burning of Moscow: Napoleon's Trial By Fire 1812. London: Pen & Sword. 2014. ASIN B00OZ3HS2G.
- Atrocities, Massacres and War Crimes: An Encyclopedia. Santa Barbara: ABC-CLIO. 2013. ISBN 978-1-59884-925-7.
- Russian Eyewitness Accounts of the Campaign of 1814. London: Frontline Books. 2013. ISBN 978-1-84832-707-8.
- Russian Eyewitness Accounts of the Campaign of 1812. London: Frontline Books. 2012. ISBN 978-1-84832-635-4.
- Conflict and Conquest in the Islamic World: A Historical Encyclopedia. ABC-CLIO. 2011. ISBN 978-1-59884-337-8.
- The A to Z of Georgia. Lanham, MA: Rowman & Littlefield/Scarecrow Press. 2010. ISBN 978-0-8108-7207-3.
- The Battle of the Berezina: Napoleon's Great Escape. London: Pen & Sword. 2010. ISBN 978-1-84415-920-8.
- The Battle of Borodino: Napoleon versus Kutuzov. London: Pen & Sword. 2007. ISBN 978-1-84415-603-0.
- Historical Dictionary of Georgia. Lanham, MA: Rowman & Littlefield/Scarecrow Press. 2007. ISBN 978-0-8108-5580-9.
- The Russian Officer Corps in the Revolutionary and Napoleonic Wars, 1792–1815. New York: Savas Beatie. 2007. ISBN 978-1-932714-02-9.
- ადამიანის უფლებებისა და ძირითადი თავისებურებების დაცვა ევროპის საბჭოს ფარგლებში: ადამიანის უფლებათა ევროპული სასამართლო [Protection of Human Rights and Basic Freedoms within the Council of Europe Framework: European Court on Human Rights], Judge's Library Series. Tbilisi: GCI. 2000.
