= Conspiration des poignards =

1800 alleged assassination attempt on First Consul of France Napoleon Bonaparte

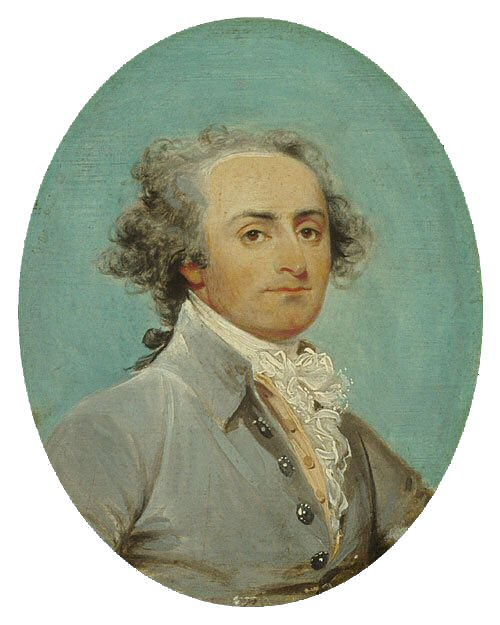
Portrait of Giuseppe Ceracchi (1751-1801), Italian sculptor

The Conspiration des poignards (from French, lit. 'Daggers Conspiracy') or Complot de l'Opéra (lit. 'Opera Plot') was an alleged assassination attempt against First Consul of France Napoleon Bonaparte. The members of the plot were not clearly established. Authorities at the time presented it as an assassination attempt on Napoleon at the exit of the Paris opera house on 18 vendémiaire year IX (10 October 1800), which was prevented by the police force of Joseph Fouché. However, this version was questioned very early on.

In his Mémoires, Fouché affirmed that, towards mid-September 1800, a plot arose aiming at assassinating Napoleon at the operahouse. Someone named Harel, presented as one of the accomplices, worked in liaison with the war commissioner Lefebvre, to bring the revelations to Louis Antoine Fauvelet de Bourrienne, Napoleon's secretary, indicating the plotters were Giuseppe Ceracchi, Joseph Diana, Joseph Antoine Aréna (brother of the Corsican deputy who had declared against Napoleon); the painter and patriotic fanatic François Topino-Lebrun, and Dominique Demerville, former clerk of the Committee of Public Safety, closely associated with Bertrand Barère de Vieuzac. Harel was charged with drawing up a trap for the plotters; four armed men, laid out for the assassination of Napoleon, on the evening of 10 October, after a performance of Les Horaces. The day of the attack, the men stationed by the police force stopped Diana, Ceracchi and their two accomplices. All the others presumably retreated and were apprehended at their residences.

For modern historians (Jean Tulard and Thierry Lentz) this was a manipulation by the police force, made possible by an agent provocateur, Harel, who had infiltrated the group. After Plot of the Rue Saint-Nicaise, the members of the "daggers conspiracy", presented as a Jacobin plot, were judged in front of the criminal court of The Seine. Four of them were condemned to death 19 nivôse year IX (9 January 1801), at eleven o'clock in the evening, after three days of debates and the sentence was carried out on 30 January after rejection of the appeal.

== Conspirators ==
The members of the plot were:

- Adjudant Joseph Antoine Aréna, brother of Barthelemy Aréna who had tried to stab Bonaparte at the time of the coup d'état of the 18 Brumaire;
- Dominique Demerville, former secretary of Barère;
- Giuseppe Ceracchi, Roman sculptor one of the founders of the Roman republic in 1798;
- François Topino-Lebrun, painter, former student of Jacques-Louis David and member of the revolutionary tribunal jury;
- Joseph Diana, 28 years, other Roman insurgent, notary, discharged;
- Armand Daiteg, 67 years, sculptor, discharged;
- Denis Lavigne, 66 years, trader, discharged;
- Madeleine Fumey, 38 years, cook or mistress of Demerville, discharged

== Bibliography ==
=== Primary sources ===
- Jugement rendu par le tribunal criminel du département de la Seine, séant au Palais de Justice, à Paris, qui,... condamne Dominique Demerville,... Joseph Ceracchi,... Joseph Aréna,... et François-Jean-Baptiste Topino-Lebrun,... à la peine de mort, qu'ils subirent aujourd'hui 11 pluviôse an neuf (Gallica website from the Bibliothèque nationale de France, the national library of France)

=== Secondary sources ===
- Jacques-Olivier Boudon, Ils voulaient tuer Napoléon : Complots et conspirations contre l'Empereur (They Wanted to Kill Napoleon: Plots and Conspiracies Against the Emperor), Tallandier, 2022.
- Pierre Marie Desmarest Quinze ans de haute police sous Napoléon (Fifteen years of policing under Napoleon), Editions A. Levavasseur, 1833, p. 37-44.
- Henri Gaubert, Conspirateurs au temps de Napoléon Ier (Conspirators in the Time of Napoleon I), Flammarion, coll. « L'Histoire », 1962, p. 354
- Gustave Hue, Un Complot de police sous le Consulat (A Police Plot Under the Consulate), Editions Hachette, 1909
