= Jean Tulard =

French academic and historian

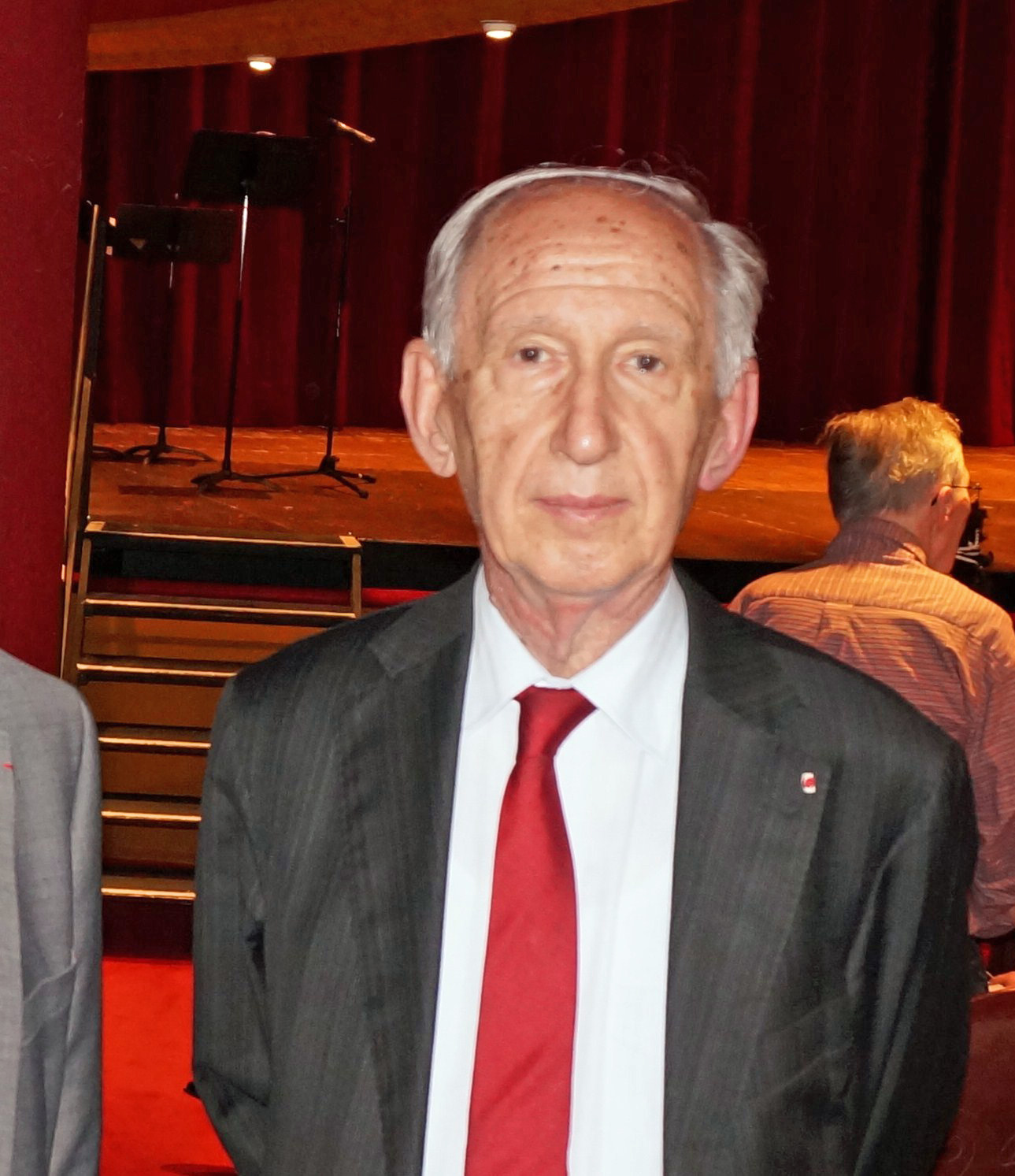
- Jean Tulard in 2014
- Born: Jean (Claude, Fernand) Tulard; 22 December 1933 (age 92); Paris, France
- Education: Lycée Louis-le-Grand; Université de Paris
- Occupation: Historian
- Known for: specialist of the Napoleonic Wars, the First French Empire and the French Revolution
- Title: Member of the Académie des sciences morales et politiques
- Spouse: Marie-Josée Fagnot
- Children: Jacques, Pierre and Florence Tulard

Jean Tulard (French pronunciation: [ʒɑ̃ tylaʁ]; born 22 December 1933, Paris) is a French academic and historian. Considered one of the best specialists of Napoleon Bonaparte and the Napoleonic era (Directory, Consulate and First French Empire), he is considered by his peers "the master of Napoleonic studies".

He was a professor at the Sorbonne University and at Sciences Po Paris. He is a member of the Institut de France via the Académie des sciences morales et politiques. He is also very interested in the history of cinema.

== Career ==
After graduating first in his class with an agrégation in history and a PhD in literature, he became a boarder at the Fondation Thiers from 1961 to 1964, before becoming a research associate at the French National Centre for Scientific Research (Centre national de la recherche scientifique) (CNRS). Director of Studies at the École Pratique des Hautes Études in 1965, he was appointed professor at the Université Paris-Sorbonne and the Sciences Po Paris in 1981. Jean Tulard was President of the Société de l'histoire de Paris et de l'Île-de-France from 1973 to 1977, and President of the Institut Napoléon from 1974 to 1997.

President of the Société de l'histoire de Paris et de l'Île-de-France (1973-1977), he was also president (1974-1999) and then honorary president (since 1999) of the Institut Napoléon, and a member of the board of directors of the Cinémathèque française (since 2004) and 4.8.

He is a member of the board of the Cinémathèque française and of the Comité pour l'histoire préfectorale (2012-2018), and was the historical consultant for the TV film Valmy (1968), by Jean Chérasse and Abel Gance, and for La Révolution française (1989), by Robert Enrico and Richard T. Heffron. Honorary president of the Institut Napoléon, he has chaired the scientific advisory board of the Figaro Histoire since 2012.

A member of the Centre Vendéen de Recherches Historiques, he has also been a member of the Académie des Sciences Morales et Politiques since 16 May 1994, elected to the History and Geography section in the chair of Roland Mousnier. He was President of the Academy in 2005.

== Why Napoleon? ==
Because of his family origins (his parents were both senior civil servants at the Préfecture de Police, and his mother was director of the Préfecture de Police museum), Jean Tulard devoted his doctoral thesis to the history of the administration in Paris (Paris et son administration, 1800-1830).

He intended to study at the Faculty of Law and become a magistrate. A problem with his enrolment led him to change his course. After completing his thesis, which covered the period of the First French Empire, he became a lecturer at the Sorbonne in 1967 and began to devote himself to Napoleonic studies.

In 1965, Michel Fleury, director of the Ecole Pratique des Hautes Etudes (EPHE), under whose supervision he wrote a thesis on the Prefecture of Police under the July Monarchy (republished by the CNRS under the title "La Police Parisienne entre Deux Revolutions - 1830-1848)"), created a new research department, the "Chair of History of the First Empire". Jean Tulard was elected to this chair, which he held for thirty-five years. At the same time, he joined the University of Paris IV (now Sorbonne University) to teach the history of the French Revolution and the First French Empire. He also taught administrative history at Sciences-Po Paris.

== Forensic verification of Louis XVII's heart identity: Tulard's expertise in deciphering royal remains ==
Tulard was one of the experts involved in verifying the heart believed to be that of Louis XVII, actually the Dauphin of France as the heir apparent to the throne, who died in 1795 in imprisonment. Scientists using DNA samples from Queen Anne of Romania, and her son André de Bourbon-Parme, maternal relatives of Louis XVII, and from a strand of Marie Antoinette's hair, proved the young royal's identity. Historic evidence as to the location of the heart over the decades was also considered. In a summary of the investigation in 2004, Tulard wrote: "This heart is ... almost certainly that of Louis XVII. We can never be 100 per cent sure but this is about as sure as it gets".

== Film activities ==
Jean Tulard took part as a "historical consultant" in the TV film Valmy, directed by Jean Chérasse and Abel Gance and broadcast for the first time in 1967. With a total running time of 208 minutes, the film is divided into three parts: 1. the fall of royalty, 2. chronicling the summer of 1792, 3. Battle and birth of the Republic.

In 1989, he was the "historical adviser" for the film La Révolution française, directed by Robert Enrico and Richard T. Heffron, in a co-production with French, Italian, German, Canadian and British investors. Depending on the version, the film lasts between 180 and 360 minutes.

Jean Tulard is a member of the Sponsorship Committee of the Institut régional du cinéma et de l'audiovisuel de Corse, chaired by French director Magà Ettori (since 2009).

== Literature ==
Jean Tulard is a member of the jury for the Prix des Hussards, created by Food critic Christian Millau.

== Private life ==
Jean (Claude, Fernand) Tulard spent his childhood in Albi in the region of Occitania in the Southern France, and developed a passion for cinema. His mother started out as a primary school teacher and later became curator of the archives of the Musée de la Préfecture de Police.

Married to Marie-Josée Fagnot, Jean Tulard had three children.

== Publications ==
Many of the following books have been translated into many languages, including English:

- 1962 : Histoire de la Crète.
- 1964 : L'Anti-Napoléon, la légende noire de l'Empereur.
- 1964 : La Préfecture de Police sous la monarchie de Juillet.
- 1965 : Alexander von Humboldt, L'Amérique espagnole en 1800 (édition critique).
- 1968 : Première édition critique des Œuvres littéraires et écrits militaires de Napoléon, 3 volumes.
- 1970 : Nouvelle Histoire de Paris : le Consulat et l'Empire.
- 1971 : Bibliographie critique des Mémoires sur le Consulat et l'Empire.
- 1971 : Le Mythe de Napoléon.
- 1973 : Atlas administratif de l'Empire français.
- 1973 : Lettres inédites de Cambacérès à Napoléon (édition critique).
- 1976 : Paris et son administration (1800-1830).
- 1978 : La Vie quotidienne des Français sous Napoléon.
- 1978 : Napoléon ou le mythe du sauveur.
- 1979 : Napoléon et la noblesse d'Empire.
- 1981 : Napoléon à Sainte-Hélène.
- 1982 : Dictionnaire du cinéma. Tome I : Les Réalisateurs (réédition 1996-1997).
- 1982 : Le Grand Empire - rééd. 2009.
- 1983 : Murat.
- 1985 : Dictionnaire du cinéma. Tome II : Acteurs, producteurs, scénaristes, techniciens (réédition 1996-1997).
- 1985 : Les Révolutions.
- 1985 : Joseph Fiévée, conseiller secret de Napoléon.
- 1987 : Histoire et dictionnaire de la Révolution française 1789-1799 (en collaboration).
- 1988 : Dictionnaire Napoléon (sous la direction de J. T.).
- 1989 : Nouvelle Histoire de Paris : la Révolution.
- 1990 : La Contre-Révolution (sous la direction de J. T.). (ISBN 2-262-00609-1)
- 1990 : Guide des films (sous la direction de J. T.). (ISBN 2-221-90054-5)
- 1990 : Almanach de Paris (sous la direction de J. T.). (ISBN 2-85229-702-7)
- 1990 : Les Écoles historiques (en collaboration). (ISBN 2-13-042835-5)
- 1991 : Le Directoire et le Consulat. (ISBN 2-13-043980-2)
- 1991 : Le Métier d'historien (en collaboration). (ISBN 2-13-044024-X)
- 1991 : Jean Tulard (dir.), Alfred Fierro (collaborateur) et Jean-Marc Leri (collaborateur), L'histoire de Napoléon par la peinture, Paris, Belfond, 1991, 317 p. (ISBN 2-7144-2693-X, BNF 35419262), prix Paul-Marmottan 1991.
- 1992 : Napoléon II (17e prix Fondation Pierre-Lafue 1993). (ISBN 2-213-02966-0)
- 1993 : Procès-verbal de la cérémonie du sacre et du couronnement de Napoléon signé par Louis-Philippe de Ségur. (Présentation et notes) (ISBN 2-11-081287-7)
- 1993 : Napoléon : jeudi 12 octobre 1809, le jour où Napoléon faillit être assassiné.
- 1993 : Itinéraire de Napoléon au jour le jour (en collaboration).
- 1994 : La Petite Histoire de France (en collaboration).
- 1994 : Le Marché de l'histoire (en collaboration). (ISBN 2-13-046169-7)
- 1995 : La France de la Révolution et de l'Empire. (ISBN 2-13-054191-7)
- 1995 : Dictionnaire du Second Empire (sous la direction de J. T.). (ISBN 2-213-59281-0)
- 1995 : Histoire et dictionnaire du Consulat et de l'Empire (en collaboration). (ISBN 978-2-221-11421-6)
- 1995 : La Morale de l'histoire (en collaboration).
- 1996 : Mémoires de Talleyrand (présentation et notes). (ISBN 2-7433-0172-4)
- 1996 : Le Temps des passions : espérances, tragédies et mythes sous la Révolution et l'Empire (en collaboration).
- 1997 : Napoléon : le pouvoir, la nation, la légende.
- 1997 : Jeanne d'Arc, Napoléon, le paradoxe du biographe (en collaboration).
- 1998 : Joseph Fouché. (ISBN 2-213-59991-2)
- 1999 : Le 18-Brumaire. Comment terminer une révolution. (ISBN 2-262-01221-0)
- 2005 : Dictionnaire du roman policier, 1841-2005 : auteurs, personnages, œuvres, thèmes, collections, éditeurs (Fayard). (ISBN 2-213-62590-5)
- 2005 : Les Thermidoriens (Fayard). (ISBN 978-2-213-62012-1)
- 2006 : Napoléon - Les grands moments d'un destin. (ISBN 978-2-8185-0308-9)
- 2008 : Les Pieds Nickelés de Forton (Armand Colin), coll. « Une œuvre, une histoire » (ISBN 978-2-200-35055-0).
- 2009 : Dictionnaire amoureux du cinéma (ISBN 978-2-259-20831-4)
- 2009 : Alexandre Dumas (PUF), (ISBN 978-2-35764-005-4).
- 2011 : Talleyrand ou la douceur de vivre, Bibliothèque des Introuvables, Paris (ISBN 978-2-84575-343-3).
- 2012 : Détective de l'histoire, Éditions Écritures
- 2012 : Dictionnaire amoureux de Napoléon, Plon
- 2012 : La Berline de Napoléon Albin Michel
- 2012 : Le Pouvoir du Mal, les méchants dans l'Histoire Éditions SPM
- 2012 : Napoléon chef de guerre, Tallandier (ISBN 978-2847349924).
- 2013 : Quand Laurel rencontra Hardy, éditions SPM, Paris, (ISBN 978-2-917232-15-6).
- 2014 : La Police parisienne - Entre deux révolutions (1830-1848), éditions du CNRS, collection Biblis, Paris, 194 pages, (ISBN 978-2-271-07994-7).
- 2014 : Napoléon et quarante millions de sujets - La centralisation et le Premier Empire (avec Marie-José Tulard), Tallandier, (ISBN 979-1021001473).
- 2015 : Le Monde selon Napoléon, Tallandier
- 2016 : Rossini sous Napoléon, éditions SPM, (ISBN 978-2-917-232-49-1).
- 2016 : Les historiens de Napoléon, éditions SPM, (ISBN 978-2-917-232-36-1).
- 2017 : Le Monde du crime sous Napoléon, La Librairie Vuibert (ISBN 978-2-311-10202-4).
- 2018 : Le Nouveau Guide des films (tome V), dir., Bouquins, 928 p.
- 2019 : Tyrans, assassins et conspirateurs éditions SPM, (ISBN 978-2-917-232-94-1).
- 2019 : De Napoléon et quelques autres sujets, Tallandier, (ISBN 979-10-210-3798-4).
- 2019 : Le Musée du crime - Chroniques du 36 quai des Orfèvres (avec Hélène Tulard), Maisonneuve et Larose (nouvelles éditions), Hémisphères (éditions), (ISBN 9-782377-010387).
- 2020 : L'Europe au temps de Napoléon (dir.), Cerf.
- 2021 : Marengo ou l'étrange victoire de Bonaparte, Buchet/Chastel,
- 2023 : L'Empire de l'argent, Tallandier

== Prizes and awards ==
- Grand prix Gobert from the Académie française (1971).
- Prix Berger from the Académie des inscriptions et belles-lettres (1973), for his Nouvelle Histoire de Paris ("New History of Paris"), written with French historians Raymond Cazelles and Marcel Reinhard, and published under the auspices of the Council of the City of Paris.
- Prix Georges-Mauguin from the Académie des sciences morales et politiques (1973).
- Grand prix national de l'Histoire (1977).
- Prix du Mémorial, grand prix littéraire d'Ajaccio (1981) - for the body of his work.
- Prix Marmottan from the Académie des Beaux-Arts (1992).
- Prix Pierre-Lafue (1993), for his book Napoléon II, the son of Napoleon.
- Prix Richelieu (1993).
- Prix Simone-Genevois (1998).
- Prix de l'Union (2001).
- Ambassadors Prize (Prix des Ambassadeurs) (2007).

In April 2010, he became Commander of the Legion of Honour, created by Napoleon.

== See also ==
- Institut Napoléon
- Napoleon legacy and memory
- Napoleonic studies
- Thierry Lentz
- Fondation Napoléon
