= François Topino-Lebrun =

French painter

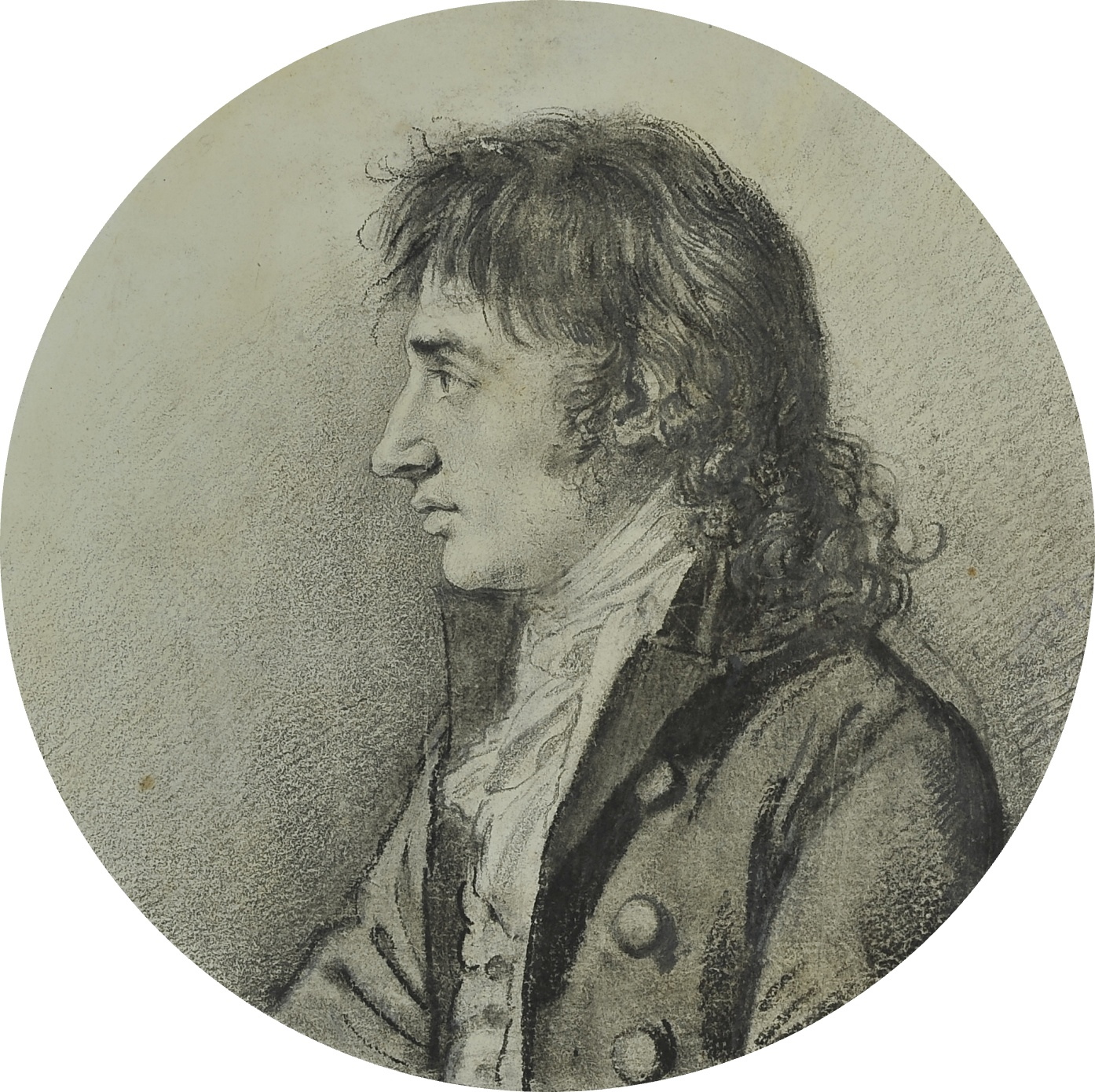
Portrait of Topino-Lebrun by Jean-Baptiste Wicar, 1791

The Siege of Sparta

François Jean-Baptiste Topino-Lebrun (11 April 1764, in Marseille – 30 January 1801, in Paris) was a French painter and revolutionary. He worked in the Neo-Classical style and was said to be the favorite student of Jacques-Louis David.

== Biography ==
His father was a furniture dealer and his uncle was a master cabinet maker. He began his studies at the Académie de Marseille under the direction of Jean-Joseph Kapeller, one of its founding members. He went to Rome in 1784, where he met Jacques-Louis David, who was then working on the "Oath of the Horatii". Back in France, he settled in Paris where, from 1787 to 1790, he worked in David's studio at the Académie royale de peinture et de sculpture. He returned to Rome from 1790 to 1792 and was one of group of artists who supported the French Revolution.

Under threat by the authorities of the Papal States, he fled to Paris and lived with David. The following year, he was selected to be part of a mission from the Interior Ministry, charged with assessing the political situation in Marseille. On his return, with the support of David and Pierre-Antoine Antonelle, he was appointed to the Revolutionary Tribunal. In that capacity, he was part of the jury that tried Georges Danton. He barely managed to retain his position after the Thermidorean Reaction, and next appears in late 1794 as a jury member at the trial of Jean-Baptiste Carrier and other members of the "Revolutionary Committee of Nantes". The following year, perhaps after a brief stay in prison, he became an associate of Gracchus Babeuf and Marc-Antoine Jullien de Paris then, in November, he accompanied Jean Bassal (one of the Montagnards) on an official mission to Switzerland.

He returned to Paris in 1797 and, troubled by the trial of the Babeuvistes, he began painting again, for the first time in five years. It was then that he completed his best known work, depicting the death of Gaius Gracchus; an allusion to the suicide attempt made by Gracchus Babeuf after hearing his death sentence. When the painting was shown at the Salon in 1798, no one dared to say the name "Gracchus". In 1799, he joined the Club du Manège, a Neo-Jacobin organization, and painted "The Siege of Sparta", a call-to-arms to defend the Republic.

Later, he became a suspect in the Conspiration des poignards, an alleged plot to assassinate Napoléon that was apparently begun by a police agent in what would now be called a "sting operation". He was arrested on October 10, 1800, together with Dominique Demerville (a member of the Committee of Public Safety), Adjutant-General Joseph Antoine Aréna and the sculptor Giuseppe Ceracchi. His trial took place shortly after the Plot of the rue Saint-Nicaise, attributed to the Jacobins, so a fair trial was less possible than usual. Despite repeated protests of his innocence and lack of evidence, he was found guilty and guillotined on January 31, 1801.

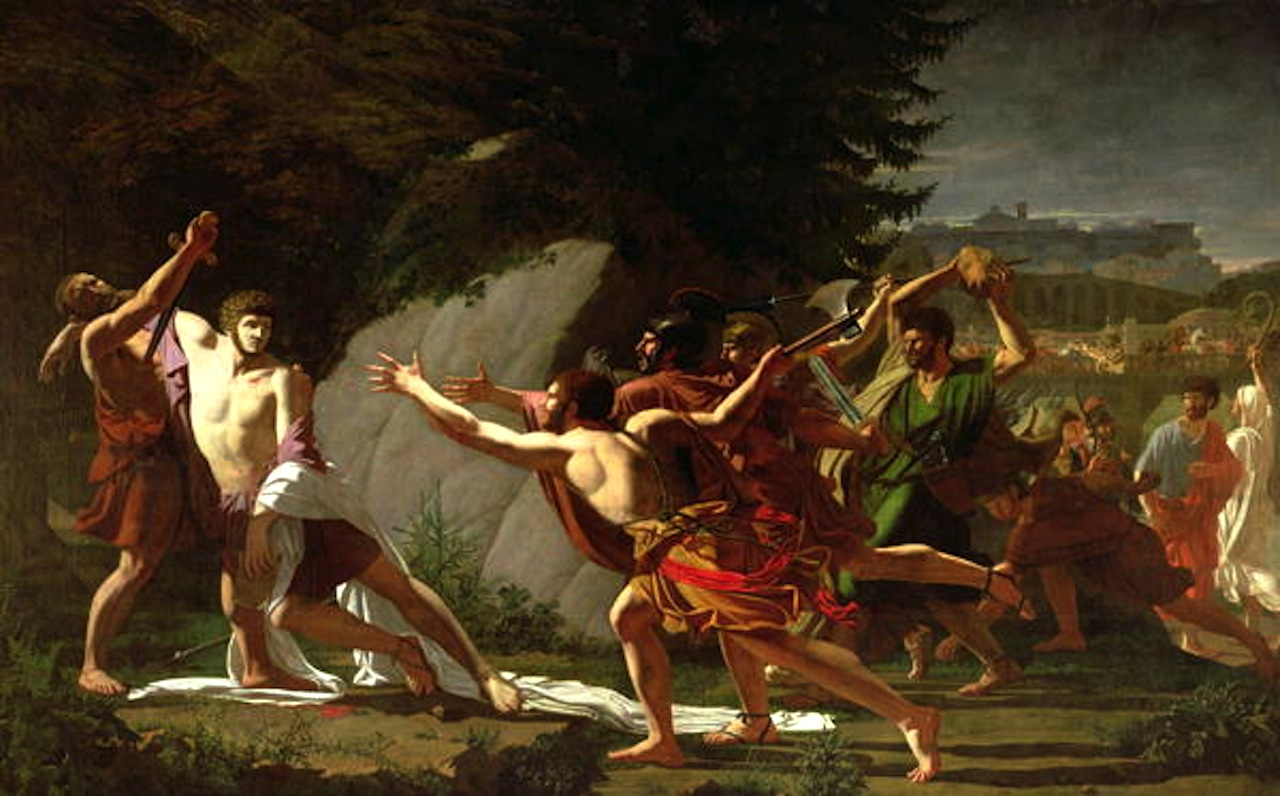
The Death of Gaius Gracchus

== Sources ==
- Philippe Bordes, "Documents inédits sur Topino-Lebrun", in the Bulletin de la Société de l'Histoire de l'Art français, 1976, pgs.289-300.
- Philippe Bordes and Alain Jouffroy :
  - Guillotine et peinture : Topino-Lebrun et ses amis, Paris, Éditions du Chêne, 1977. ISBN 2-85108-134-9
  - "Les Arts après la Terreur", in La Revue du Louvre, 1979, #3, pgs. 203-212.
- "Topino-Lebrun, François Jean-Baptiste", in Dictionnaire historique de la Révolution française, edited by Albert Soboul, Paris, Presses universitaires de France, 1989. ISBN 2-13-042522-4
- Émile Campardon, Histoire du Tribunal révolutionnaire de Paris 17 mars 1793-31 mai 1795, Poulet-Malassis, 1862
