= Ettori =

Ettori is a surname. Notable people with the surname include:

- Jean-Luc Ettori (born 1955), French footballer
- Magà Ettori (born 1972), Corsican filmmaker living in Dublin

== See also ==
- Ettore
