= Plot of the rue Saint-Nicaise =

1800 assassination attempt on Napoleon

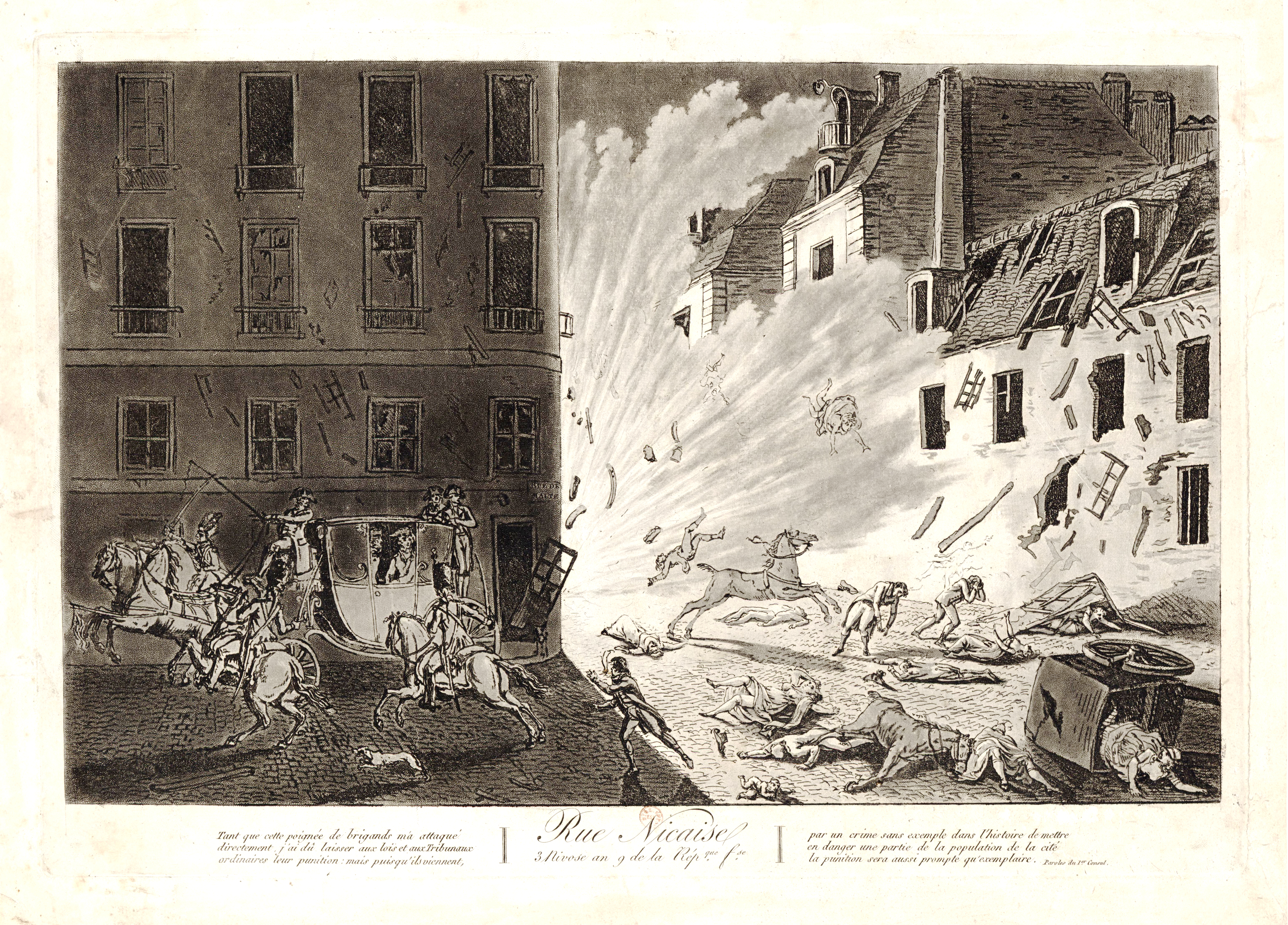
The Plot of the Rue Saint-Nicaise, etching

The Plot of the rue Saint-Nicaise, also known as the machine infernale plot, was an assassination attempt on the First Consul of France, Napoleon Bonaparte, in Paris on 24 December 1800. It followed the conspiration des poignards of 10 October 1800 and was one of many Royalist and Catholic plots. Though Napoleon and his wife Joséphine narrowly escaped the attempt, five people were killed and twenty-six others were injured.

The name of the machine infernale, the 'infernal device', was in reference to an episode during the sixteenth-century revolt against Spanish rule in Flanders. In 1585, during the Siege of Antwerp by the Spaniards, an Italian engineer in Spanish service made an explosive device from a barrel bound with iron hoops, filled with gunpowder, flammable materials and bullets, and set off by a blunderbuss triggered from a distance by a string. The Italian engineer called it la macchina infernale.

== The plotters ==
The machine infernale attempt on Napoleon's life was planned by seven royalist Breton Chouans:

- Pierre Robinault de Saint-Régeant (1768–1801): a supporter of Louis XVIII, Saint-Régeant had tried to stir up a revolt in western France the previous year, and had publicly torn up Napoleon's offer of amnesty to the Vendéens.
- Pierre Picot de Limoëlan (1768–1826): the son of a guillotined royalist nobleman.
- Georges Cadoudal (1771–1804): the Chouannerie leader.
- Jean-Baptiste Coster (1771–1804): one of Cadoudal's ablest lieutenants, known as Saint-Victor.
- The other three plotters were the noblemen Joyaux d'Assas, Jérôme Pétion de Villeneuve, and La Haye-Saint-Hilaire.

Cadoudal had charged Limoëlan and Saint-Régeant with the task of taking Napoleon's life. They in turn enlisted an older Chouan named François-Joseph Carbon (1756–1801), "a stocky man with a fair beard and a scar on his brow," who had fought in the wars of the Vendée under the rebel leader Louis-Auguste-Victor, Count de Ghaisnes de Bourmont.

== Assassination attempt ==
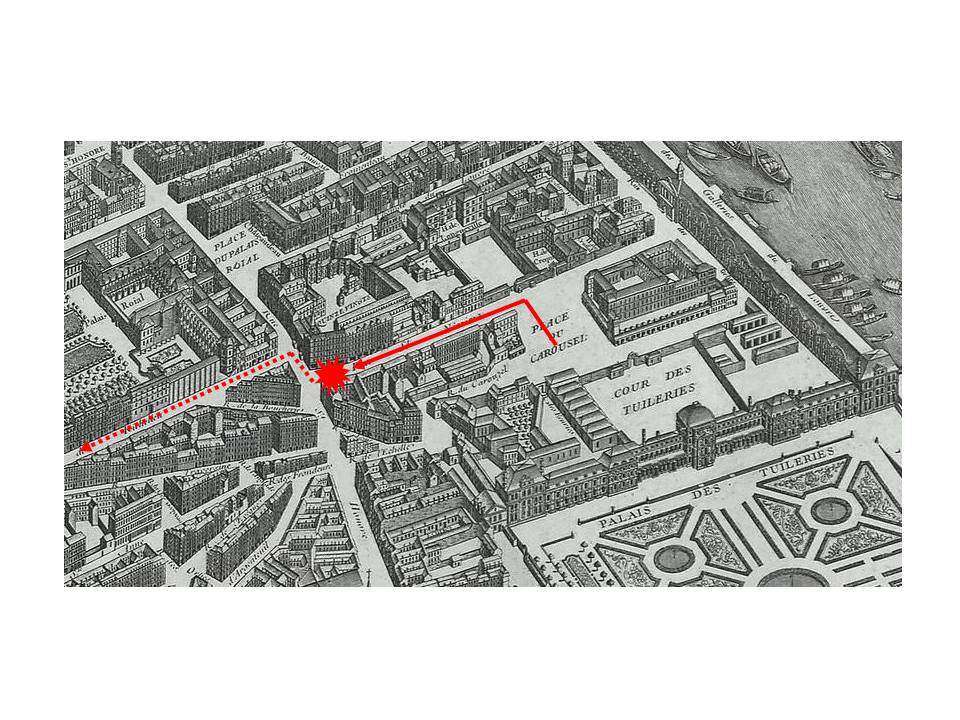
The path of Napoleon's carriage during the plot of the rue Saint-Nicaise in Paris (December 24, 1800)

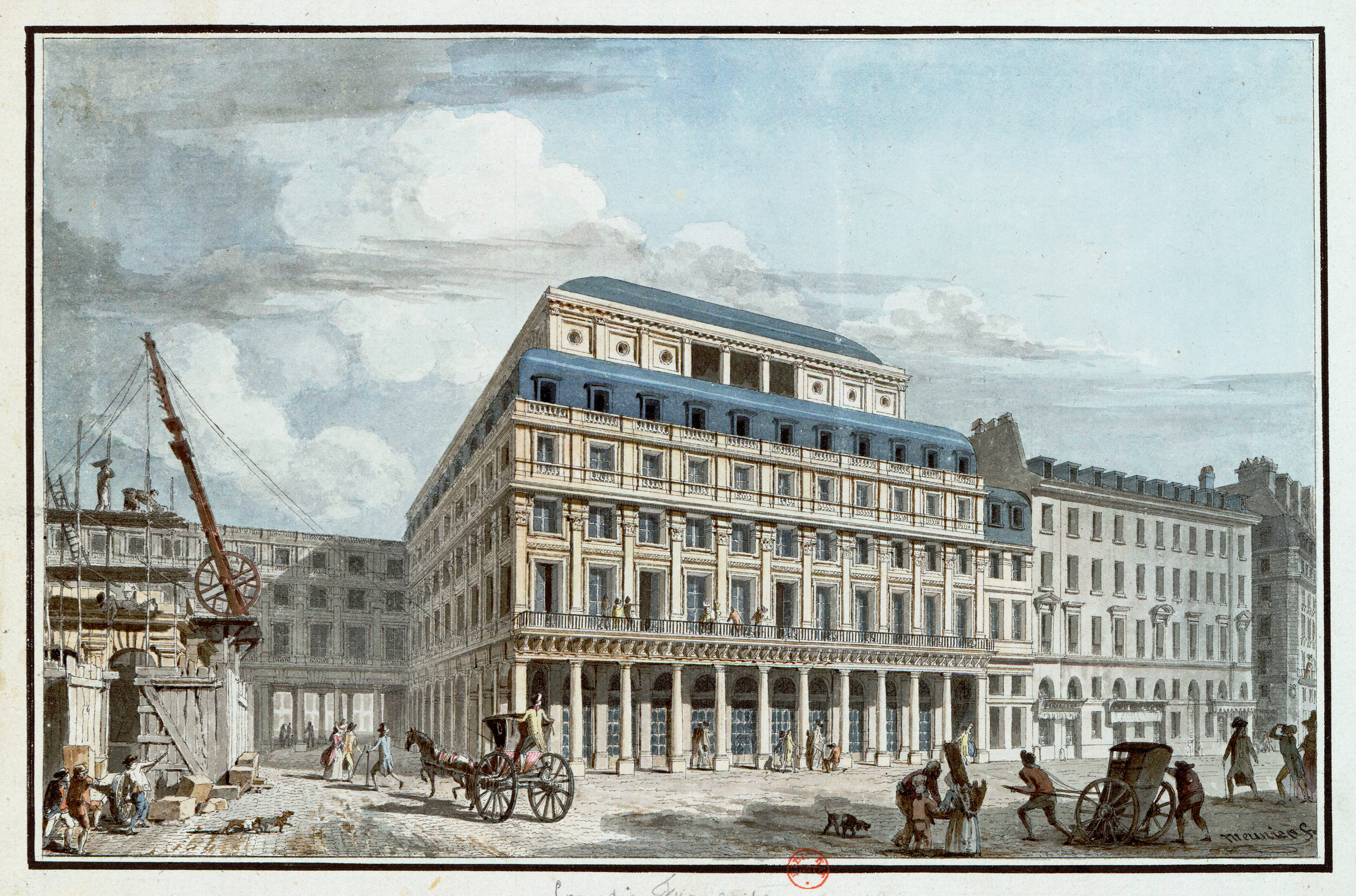
A late 18th-century watercolour of the Comédie-Française

On the late afternoon of 3 Nivôse Year IX of the French Republic (Christmas Eve, December 24, 1800) the plotter Carbon, who had made the machine infernale, harnessed a mare to a cart carrying a large wine cask, and with Limoëlan drove it to the Porte Saint-Denis, on the northern outskirts of Paris. In a deserted building, they loaded the cask with gunpowder.

They then drove it to the rue Saint-Nicaise, north of the palace. Limoëlan crossed over to the Place du Carrousel, whence he could signal to his two fellow plotters to light the fuse. Saint-Régeant saw a fourteen-year-old girl named Marianne Peusol, whose mother sold fresh-baked rolls and vegetables in the nearby rue du Bac. He paid her twelve sous to hold the mare for a few minutes. At 8 P.M., thinking his police had caught the plotters against him, a relaxed but tired Napoleon reluctantly drove to the Opéra to attend a performance of Joseph Haydn's oratorio Die Schöpfung ('The Creation'), performed in France for the first time. Napoleon's carriage was preceded by a cavalry escort from the Consular Guard. War Minister Louis-Alexandre Berthier, General Jean Lannes, and Colonel Jacques Lauriston, Napoleon's aide-de-camp, rode with the First Consul. From their memoirs, a nineteenth-century French psychologist named Garnier deduced that on his way to the Opéra the exhausted Napoleon fell asleep.

As he slept, Napoleon is said to have had a nightmare reliving his defeat at the Tagliamento River by the Austrians three years earlier. While he had been dreaming, Napoleon's carriage, driven by a drunken man named César, passed the rue Saint-Nicaise and entered the rue du Faubourg Saint-Honoré. Limoëlan, standing in the Place du Carrousel, panicked and failed to signal Saint-Régeant in the rue Saint-Nicaise, who thus lost a minute or two of preparation. When the leading grenadiers in Napoleon's guard rode past him, Saint-Régeant lit the fuse and fled.

The machine infernale exploded, killing the teenage girl Peusol while killing and injuring many other innocent bystanders. Unharmed, Napoleon insisted on continuing to the Opéra, where the audience cheered upon learning his escape.

== Interpretation of Napoleon's dreaming ==
Sigmund Freud believed that Napoleon was "an extremely sound sleeper" and wrote about this dream. Freud thought that Napoleon had harboured a "fantasy" of the Tagliamento River battle, which was revived by the explosion. To deal with this intruding physical stimulus, the sleeping Napoleon "wove" the sound of the explosion into his dream before waking up. Still dreaming that he was being bombarded by the Austrians, Napoleon woke up crying "Nous sommes minés!" ('We have been mined!'). Freud thought that Napoleon "at last started up with a cry 'We are undermined!' ... the First Consul wove the noise of an exploding bomb into a battle dream before he woke up from it ...". Freud believed that Napoleon's dream was an "alarm-clock dream" that wove external stimuli into its structure in order to maintain the dreamer's sleep and prevent him from being disturbed by external noises. "Napoleon could sleep on – with a conviction that what was trying to disturb him was only a dream-memory of the thunder of the guns at Arcole."

Napoleon did not sleep after the explosion: "Bonaparte decided to go ahead immediately, without losing one minute in which the enemy could take advantage to kill him." Freud admitted that he had two different sources for this dream: Garnier and another source, which "did not agree in their account of it," but he did not name or cite this other source.

== Victims of the blast ==
Napoleon was badly shaken, but he had escaped the machine infernale blast physically unscathed. When he reached the Opéra he received a standing ovation from the audience. The explosion, however, killed several innocent bystanders. How many is unclear. One scholar believed that "a dozen persons were killed, and twenty-eight were wounded" in the blast. Another thought that "nine innocent people died and twenty-six were injured." A third scholar wrote that the bomb killed two people and injured six people gravely (and others lightly).

== Search for the suspects and punishments ==
Police informers believed that some extreme-left Jacobins known as "les exclusifs" plotted to kill Napoleon with a machine infernale. On 16 and 17 Brumaire (November 7–8, 1800) the Paris police arrested the exclusif suspects, including an agitator named Metge and a chemist named Chevalier.

Metge had published a pamphlet entitled Le Turc et le militaire français ('The Turk and the French Military'), comparing Napoleon to the despotic Roman ruler Julius Cæsar, who was killed by Marcus Brutus, and calling for "the birth of thousands of Bruti to stab the tyrant Bonaparte." Chevalier had experimented with explosives in a hangar and was suspected of making a bomb to dispatch Napoleon; however, the machine infernale that exploded a month later in the rue Saint-Nicaise was not Chevalier's bomb.

Napoleon had apparently convinced himself that the attempt on his life had been made by the exclusifs. Minister of Police Joseph Fouché accused the Chouans, but Napoleon would not listen. He was "deeply shocked and very angry." He believed that he had done wonders for France and that his would-be assassins were ungrateful. An enraged Napoleon told his Conseil d'État, "For such an atrocious crime we must have vengeance like a thunder-bolt; blood must flow; we must shoot as many guilty men as there have been victims." Napoleon wanted his "Jacobin enemies" removed from France. Even after the real culprits were apprehended by Fouché's police, Napoleon refused to pardon the innocent ones, insisting that they be deported from metropolitan France.

On 14 Nivôse Year IX (January 4, 1801), Napoleon and his fellow Consuls Jean-Jacques-Régis de Cambacérès and Charles-François Lebrun exiled 130 Jacobins from France. Their consular decree read: "130 citizens whose names are indicated, suspect of carrying partial responsibility for the terrorist attempt of 3 Nivôse, the explosion of the machine infernale, shall be placed under special surveillance outside the European territory of the Republic." On 15 Nivôse (January 5) the docile Sénat ratified this act by issuing a sénatus-consulte certifying that the consuls' action "preserved the constitution." The 130 suspects were deported from France without trial and without the right of appeal.

Working closely with Fouché, Dubois, the police prefect, had his men collect the remnants of the dead mare and of the cart at the scene of the explosion and question all the Paris horse traders. One of them gave the description of the man who had bought her from him. On 18 Nivôse Year IX (January 8, 1801), fifteen days after the assassination attempt, Carbon the bomb maker was identified by Lamballe – the man who had sold (or rented) the cart to him – as well as by the blacksmith who had shod the mare hitched to the cart. Fouché – who had known the Jacobins' innocence all along – brought solid proof to Napoleon that the plotters were the royalist Chouans rather than the Jacobin exclusifs. Fouché showed him the evidence that the bomb made by the exclusif Chevalier, whom Dubois' police had accused of having made the machine infernale, was quite different from the bomb that had exploded in the rue Saint-Nicaise.

The police minister, who had plotted with Charles Maurice de Talleyrand-Périgord and Clément de Ris to replace Napoleon, appeared eager to prove his loyalty to the first consul. Fouché wanted to prove that it was the royalist Chouans, not the republican exclusifs, as Napoleon had thought, who had tried to murder his boss. But Napoleon would not listen to Fouché, vowing vengeance against the Jacobins. On 19 Nivôse (January 9) the four conspirateurs des poignards('daggers conspirators') – the Jacobins Giuseppe Ceracchi, Joseph Antoine Aréna, François Topino-Lebrun and Dominique Demerville – were found guilty of plotting to murder Napoleon and condemned to death. Their protestations of innocence and of being tortured into confessing went unheeded. Napoleon, who had been a fervent Jacobin himself, now turned against his former allies. He still insisted that the Jacobin exclusifs had tried to kill him. "A Royalist attempt would upset his policy of fusion. He refused to believe that; a Jacobin attempt suited him, as conforming to his system of the moment".

On 21 Nivôse Year IX (January 11, 1801) Chevalier, who had not made the machine infernale, was executed by order of Napoleon. On 28 Nivôse (January 18), the Chouan bomb maker Carbon was arrested. Under torture he gave the names of his fellow plotters, Limoëlan and Saint-Régeant. On 30 Nivôse (January 20), four weeks after the machine infernale explosion, Napoleon executed the exclusif pamphleteer Metge and two of his friends, even though there was no proof that any of them had been involved in the plot.

On 1 Pluviôse Year IX (January 21, 1801) Napoleon named the 44-year-old scientist Jean-Antoine-Claude Chaptal de Chanteloup to the post of France's interior minister. On January 25 Carbon's fellow plotter, Saint-Régeant, was arrested. One scholar thought that "Saint-Réjant escaped to the United States and – the least the would-be assassin could do – became a priest." In fact, Saint-Régeant was executed on 30 Germinal (April 20) at the Place de Grève in Paris, where the attempted regicide Robert-François Damiens had been executed in 1757, and the man who escaped to the US was the conspirator Limoëlan. He had expressed feeling guilt about the death of the girl, Peusol, who had held the horse hitched to the cart. Limoëlan was ordained a priest in 1812, and died in 1826.

== Napoleon's reaction ==
In reaction to the attempt on Napoleon's life, 130 prominent Jacobins were exiled. On 10 Pluviôse Year IX (January 30, 1801) the four conspirateurs des poignards – Ceracchi, Aréna, Topino-Lebrun and Demerville – who had been found guilty of plotting to murder the first consul and condemned to death, were guillotined. Napoleon had gotten rid of his remaining Jacobin enemies.

Their deaths, however, did not spell an end to plots against him. The royalists were still after him, and he saw plotters everywhere, especially in Corsica. The political journalist Pierre Louis Roederer claimed that Napoleon told him, "If I die in four or five years, the clock will be wound up and will run. If I die before then, I don't know what will happen." One biographer, however, believed that so many Frenchmen needed Napoleon and feared for his life that their fear made it possible for him to become Emperor of the French within three years.

== In popular culture ==
The Attack of the rue Saint-Nicaise was written by G. Lenotre, a historian who wrote mainly about the French Revolution and the Reign of Terror.

The rue Saint-Nicaise attack provides the backdrop of For The King, a 2010 historical novel by Catherine Delors.

The rue Saint-Nicaise attack was the background of a mission in Ubisoft's Assassin's Creed Unity. In the mission, the Assassins help stop the radicals from setting off the device and eliminated gunners that aimed to kill Napoleon. François-Joseph Carbon appears as the main plotter behind the assassination attempt, and is eliminated by the Assassins shortly after saving Napoleon from Carbon's men.

The assassination is also shown in the Napoleon (2023) movie starring Joaquin Phoenix as the emperor of the French and Vanessa Kirby as Empress Josephine.
