= Alexander Hamilton (Ceracchi) =

Marble bust by Giuseppe Ceracchi

- Ceracchi's original bust of Hamilton, Alexander Hamilton, on display at Crystal Bridges Museum of American Art in Bentonville, Arkansas
- Artist: Giuseppe Ceracchi
- Year: 1794
- Type: Sculpture
- Medium: White marble
- Subject: Alexander Hamilton
- Dimensions: 63.5 cm × 35.6 cm × 30.5 cm (25.0 in × 14.0 in × 12.0 in)

Alexander Hamilton is a marble bust portrait of American Founding Father Alexander Hamilton, done in the style of a Roman Senator, by the Italian sculptor Giuseppe Ceracchi. Ceracchi also created many replicas, in both marble and plaster. The bust was later used as a model for several sculptures, paintings, and other works featuring Hamilton.

== History ==
=== Development ===
In 1791 or 1792, Ceracchi created a now-lost terracotta model of Alexander Hamilton, an American Founding Father and the first U.S. Secretary of the Treasury during George Washington's presidency. His initial work on the model was completed during Ceracchi's stay in Philadelphia, then the post-Revolutionary capital of the new nation.

The work was then sent to Rome, where Ceracchi created the marble version. In July 1792, he wrote Hamilton, saying he was "impatient to receive the clay that I had the satisfaction of forming from your witty and significant physiognomy".

=== Presentation to Hamilton ===
In 1794, Ceracchi returned to the United States, where he delivered the bust to Hamilton. He did not receive payment for it until March 3, 1796, when Hamilton's cash book includes the entry, "for this sum through delicacy paid upon cherachi’s draft for making my bust on his own importunity & as a favour to him $620"

The Hamilton family kept the bust until 1896 when it was bequeathed to the New York Public Library along with a portrait of George Washington and The Constable-Hamilton Portrait, painted by Gilbert Stuart.

=== 2005 sale ===
Both works were subsequently sold together, as requested by the will, on November 30, 2005 to the Crystal Bridges Museum of American Art for over $8 million.

=== Current display locations ===
One of the original Ceracchi copies of the bust is now housed at Hamilton Grange in New York City. The original is on display at Crystal Bridges Museum of American Art in Bentonville, Arkansas.

== Description ==
Ceracchi portrayed Hamilton in the style of a Roman Senator, with wavy hair and bare-chested, wearing a ribbon of the Society of the Cincinnati over his right shoulder.

== Inscription ==
Ceracchi inscribed the original work on the back of in Latin, which reads:

DE FACIE PHILADELPHIAE
EX ECTIPO FLORENCIAE
FACIEBAT JOS. CERACCHI
CIDDCCLXXXXIV

Translation:

Executed in Philadelphia
and copied in Florence,
Executed by Joseph Ceracchi,
1794.

— U.S. Department of the Treasury

== Legacy ==
Between 1804 and 1808, John Trumbull used the bust as a model for a series of portraits of Hamilton.

In 1870, the first U.S. Postal Service stamp to honor Hamilton was a 30-cent stamp, which used the bust as a model.

In 1880, the bust then owned by Hamilton's son, John C. Hamilton, was used as a model for the head of the granite statue by Carl Conrads.

At the Hamilton Grange National Memorial, the National Park Service installed a touch-screen display that features an avatar modeled after Ceracchi's bust.

== Ceracchi's legacy ==
Ceracchi was born July 4, 1751, in Rome and created busts of several founding fathers during his 2 visits to Philadelphia following the American Revolutionary War.

After completing his work in Philadelphia, Ceracchi returned to Europe, visiting France, where he had once presented Napoleon with a bust. However, on his return to France, Napoleon turned against him. After experiencing an unsuccessful plot designed to depose him, Napoleon had Ceracchi guillotined at the Place de Grève on January 30, 1801, at age 49.

== Gallery ==
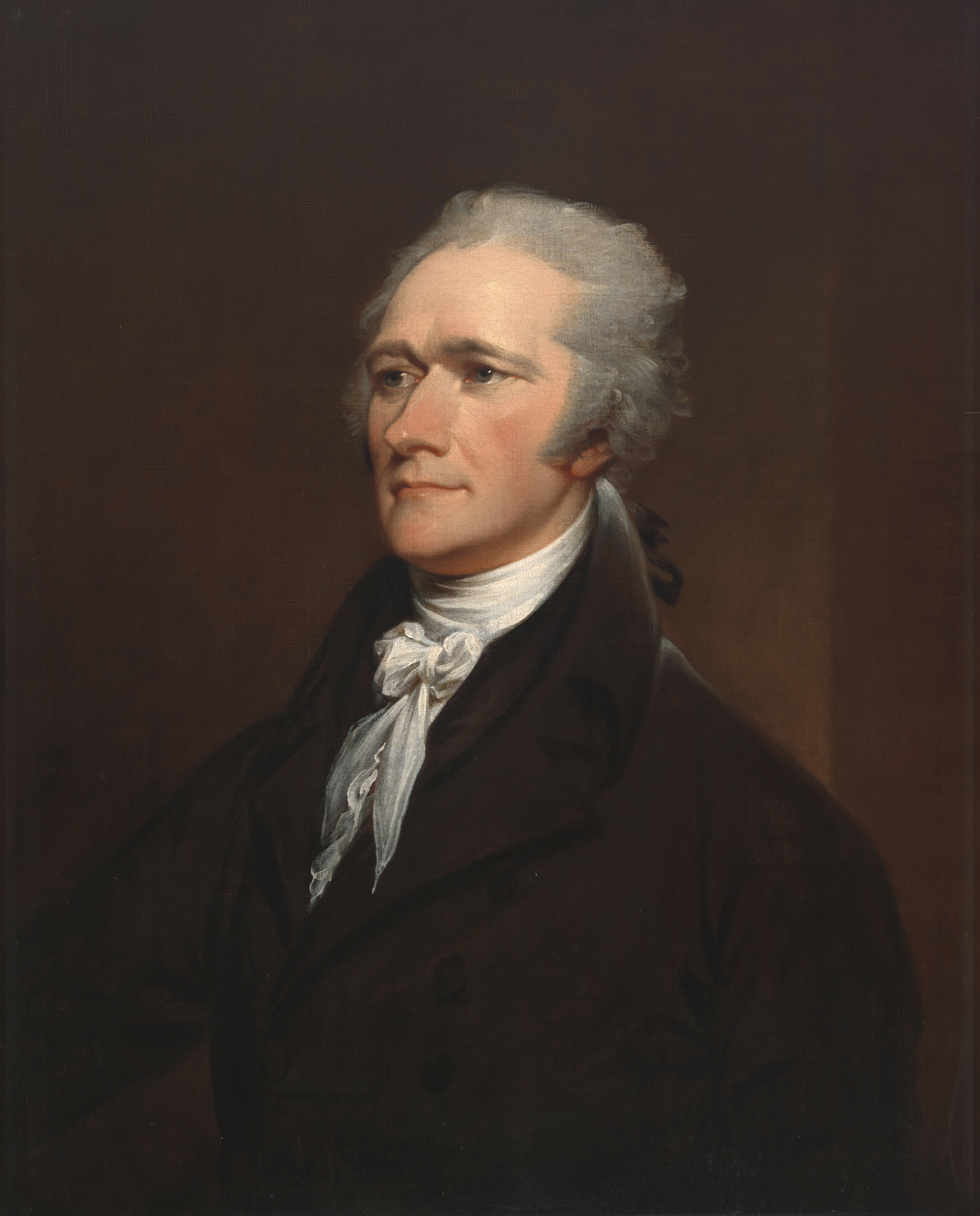
Portrait developed from the bust in 1806 by John Trumbull

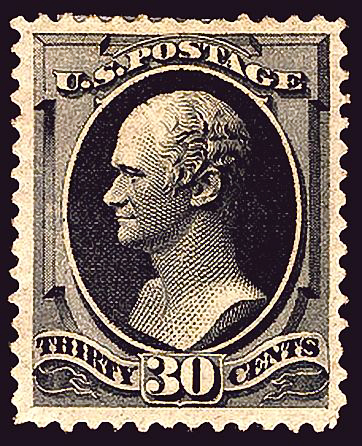
30-cent stamp featuring the bust, issued by the United States Postal Service in 1870

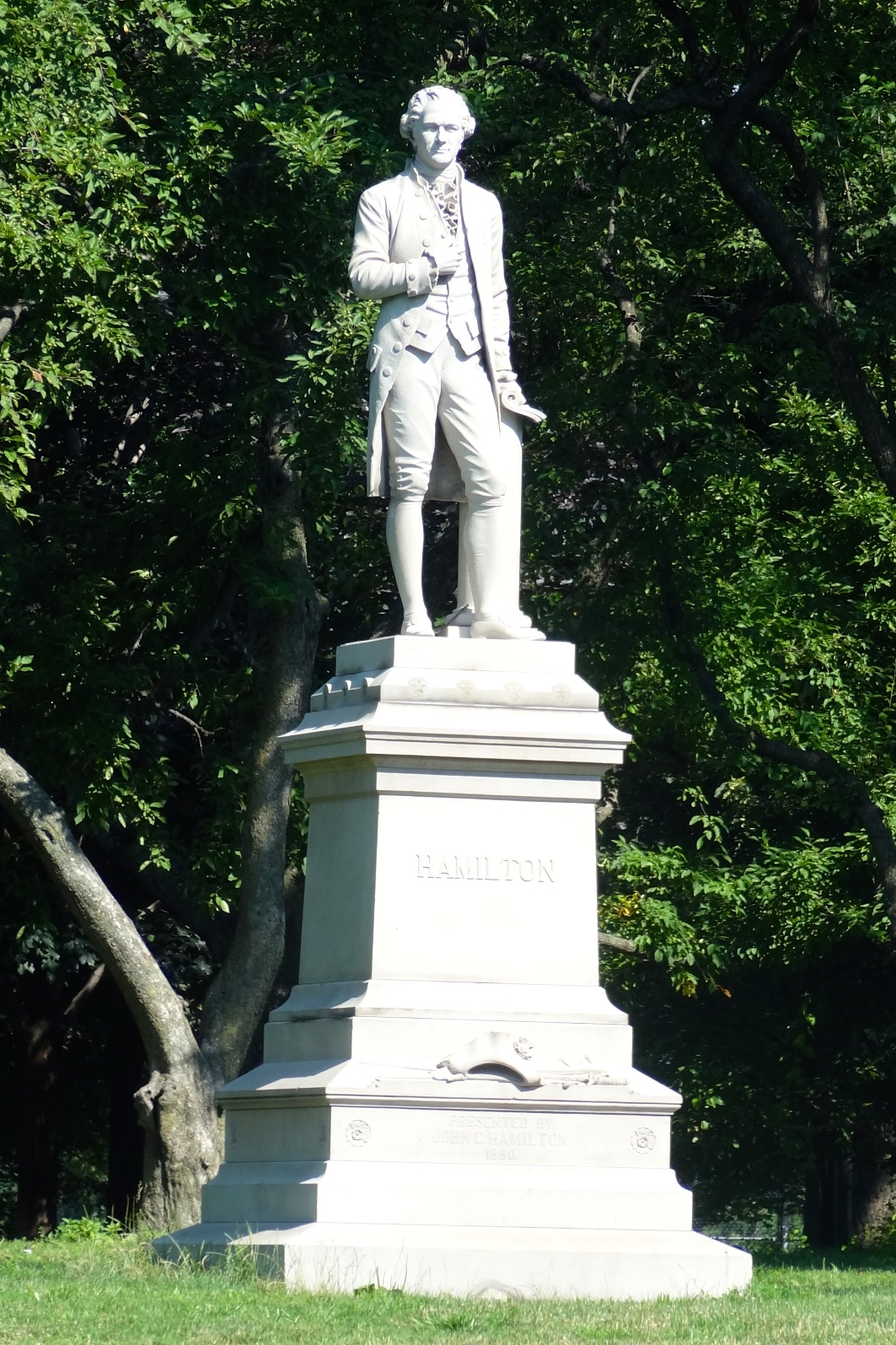
A statue developed from the bust by Carl Conrads, now located in Central Park in New York City
