= George Washington (Ceracchi) =

Sculpture by Giuseppe Ceracchi

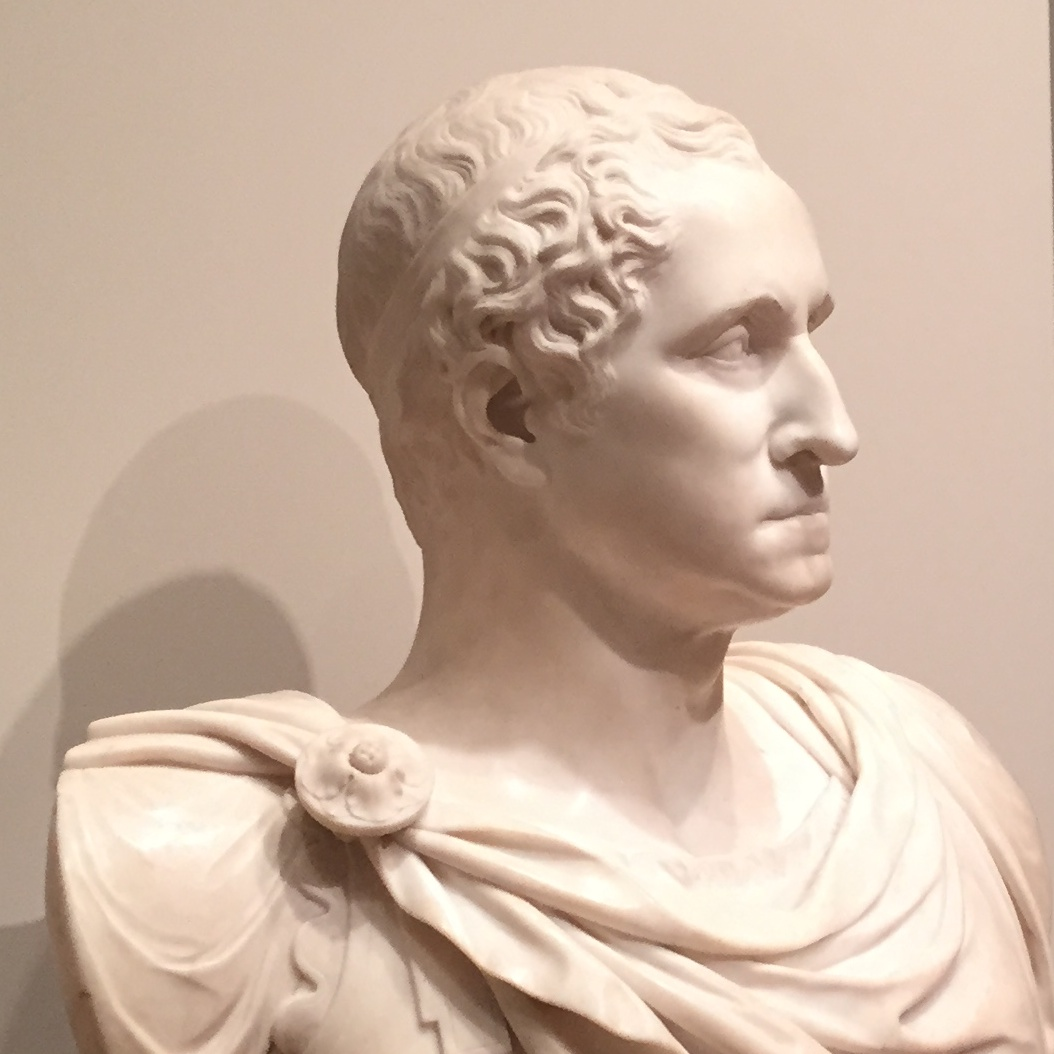
- Bust at the Metropolitan Museum of Art
- Artist: Giuseppe Ceracchi
- Year: 1795
- Type: Sculpture
- Medium: Marble
- Subject: George Washington
- Dimensions: 73.3 cm × 55.9 cm × 33 cm (28.9 in × 22.0 in × 13 in)

George Washington is a marble bust portrait of George Washington, done in the style of a Roman emperor, by the Italian sculptor Giuseppe Ceracchi. It was created as part of a campaign by Ceracchi to build a larger monument to Washington. The bust was thought by many to be one of the most lifelike. It was later used as a model of Washington for works by other sculptors and engravers.

== History ==
In the spring of 1791, Ceracchi came to Philadelphia, then the seat of the United States government, in an attempt to get a commission from Congress for a "Monument designed to perpetuate the Memory of American Liberty" featuring an equestrian statue of Washington. While waiting for congressional action, he made bust portrait models of several of the founding fathers, such as John Jay, Thomas Jefferson, and Alexander Hamilton. Initially, Washington did not want to pose for the sculptor, but eventually did so in late 1791, early 1792. Ceracchi left for Europe in 1792, and then returned to Philadelphia in 1794. He then had Washington sit for him again in 1795 to finish the marble bust he sculpted while in Italy, copied from the earlier plaster portrait bust he sculpted from life late 1791, early 1792.

== Description ==
Ceracchi portrayed Washington in the style of a Roman emperor, with short wavy hair, wearing a toga, which is pinned by a rosette brooch.

== Inscription ==
The original work is inscribed on the back in Latin, "CERACCHI FACIEBAT PHILADELPHIAE, 1795" ("Ceracchi made this in Philadelphia, 1795").

== Legacy ==
Washington refused to accept the gift of this bust from Ceracchi in 1795, though it was displayed in the president's residence until the sculptor presented him with a bill of $1,500 for it that spring, at which point the bust was sent back to Ceracchi. However, the bust was then bought by the Spanish minister, Josef de Jaudenes y Nebot, and shipped to Spain. It was next bought by Richard W. Meade, an art collector, who brought it back to Philadelphia. After his death, it was acquired by Gouverneur Kemble of Cold Spring, New York. Subsequently it was in the collection of the Corcoran Gallery of Art in Washington, D.C. In 1904, it was purchased by John Lambert Cadwalader. After his death in 1914, it was bequeathed to the Metropolitan Museum of Art, where it is now displayed in the American Wing.

In 1809, Thomas Appleton, an American consul in Italy, acquired the original plaster portrait bust. Later, this was used by the Italian sculptor Massimiliano Ravenna to create several marble copies. About 1816, one of these was bought by the White House for $80 and is now located there.

In December 1815, North Carolina commissioned a statue of Washington by Antonio Canova. Thomas Jefferson recommended that he use this bust by Ceracchi as a model for the head. The statue was delivered in 1821 and displayed in the rotunda of the North Carolina State House, but both were destroyed by fire in 1831.

The bust was also used as a model for engravings of Washington. One such engraving was included in the Life of George Washington by Washington Irving.

== Gallery ==
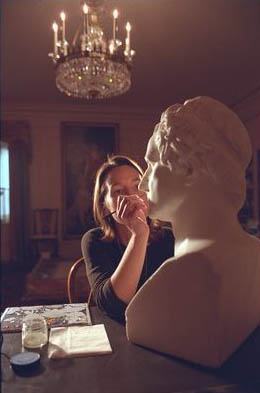
By Massimiliano Ravenna, after Ceracchi, c. 1815

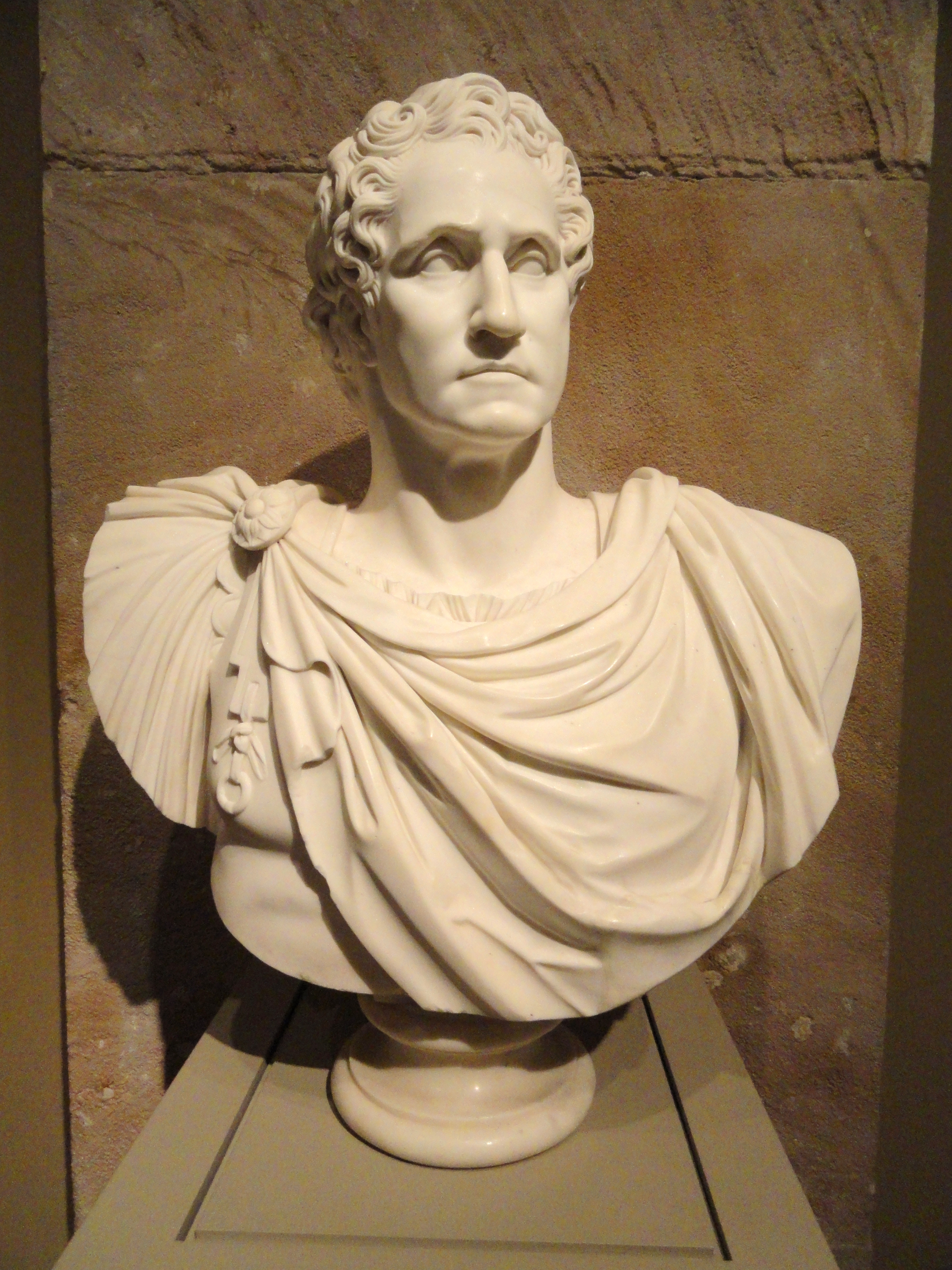
By Ravenna, after Ceracchi, c. 1819

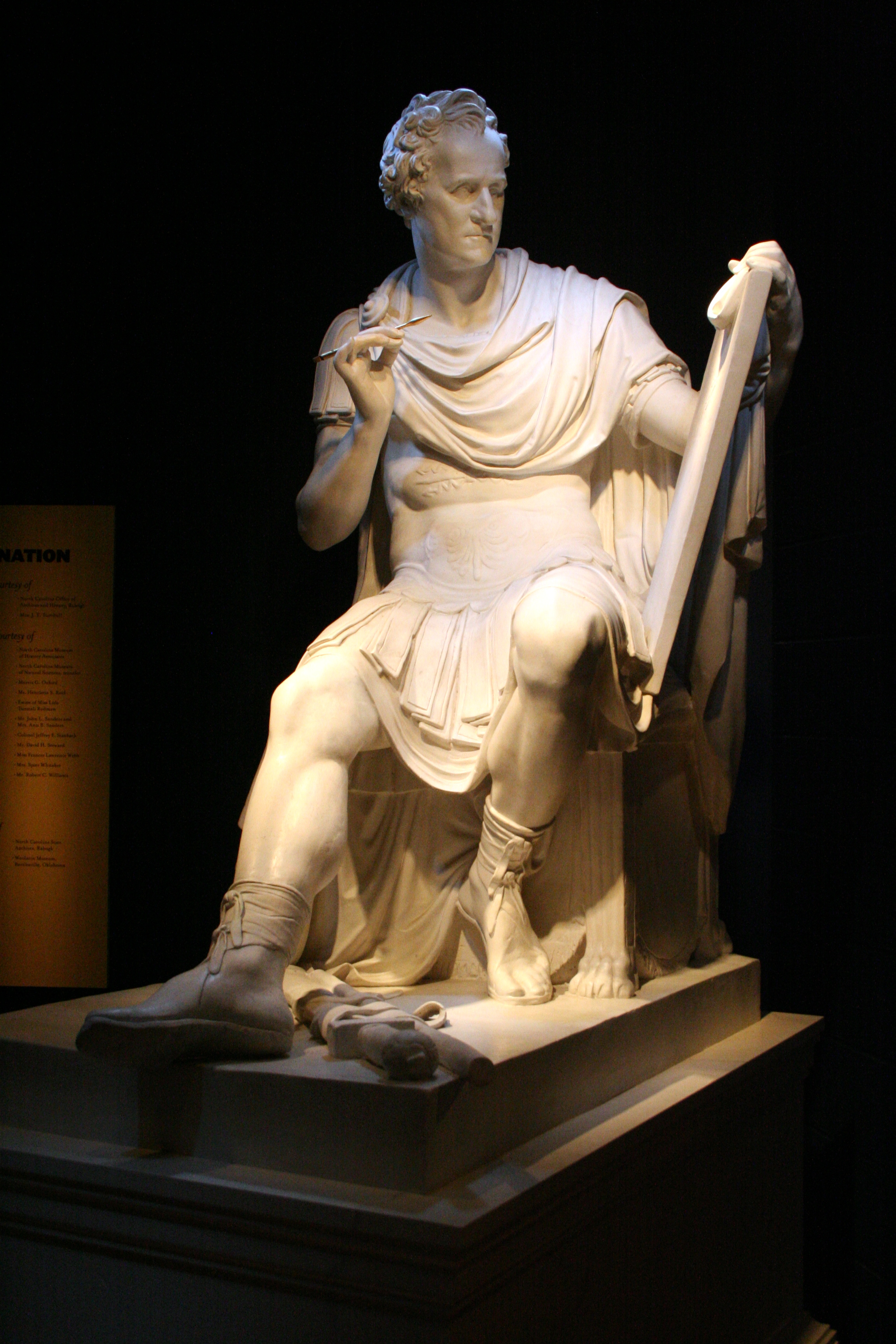
Plaster replica of George Washington by Antonio Canova, 1821

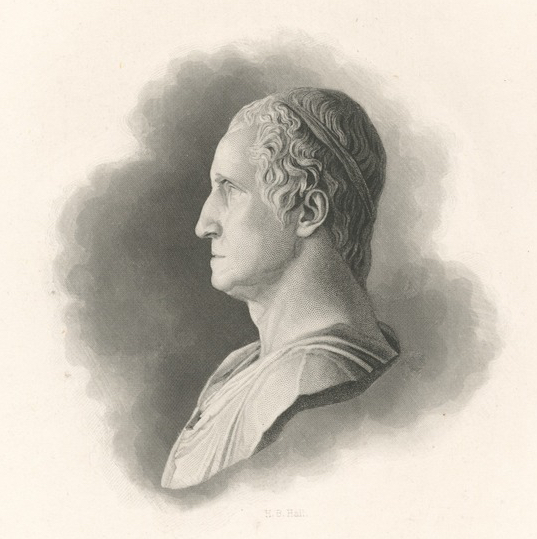
By Henry Bryan Hall, c. 1856
