= Conflict and Conquest in the Islamic World =

Two-volume encyclopedia covering the military and political history of Islam

Conflict and Conquest in the Islamic World: A Historical Encyclopedia
- Editor: Alexander Mikaberidze
- Language: English
- Genre: History
- Publisher: ABC-CLIO
- Publication date: July 22, 2011
- Pages: 1,042
- ISBN: 978-1-59884-337-8

Conflict and Conquest in the Islamic World: A Historical Encyclopedia is a two-volume encyclopedia covering the military and political history of Islam, edited by Alexander Mikaberidze and published in 2011.

The encyclopedia contains more than 600 entries from dozens of contributors, as well as a glossary, maps and photographs.
