= Giuseppe Ceracchi =

Italian sculptor

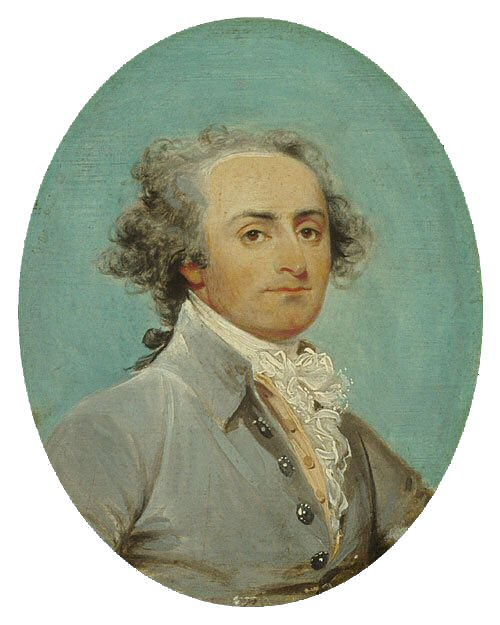
- A 1792 portrait of Ceracchi by John Trumbull
- Born: 4 July 1751; Rome, Papal States
- Died: 30 January 1801 (aged 49); Paris, French First Republic
- Notable work: Alexander Hamilton, George Washington

Giuseppe Ceracchi, also known as Giuseppe Cirachi, (4 July 1751 – 30 January 1801) was an Italian sculptor active in a Neoclassic style. He worked in Italy, England, and in the United States following the nation's emergence following the American Revolutionary War.

Ceracci was a passionate republican who supported both the American and French revolutions. During his career, he created portrait busts of prominent British and American political and military figures, including, Alexander Hamilton in 1794 and George Washington the following year, in 1795. In the United States, he worked predominantly in the post-Revolutionary capital of Philadelphia.

== Early life and education ==
He initially trained in Rome with Tommaso Righi (1727–1802) and then continued his studies at the Accademia di San Luca. He went to London in 1773, armed with a letter of introduction from Matthew Nulty, an English antiquarian and amateur sculptor in Rome, and worked under Agostino Carlini, a founding member of the Royal Academy.

== Career ==
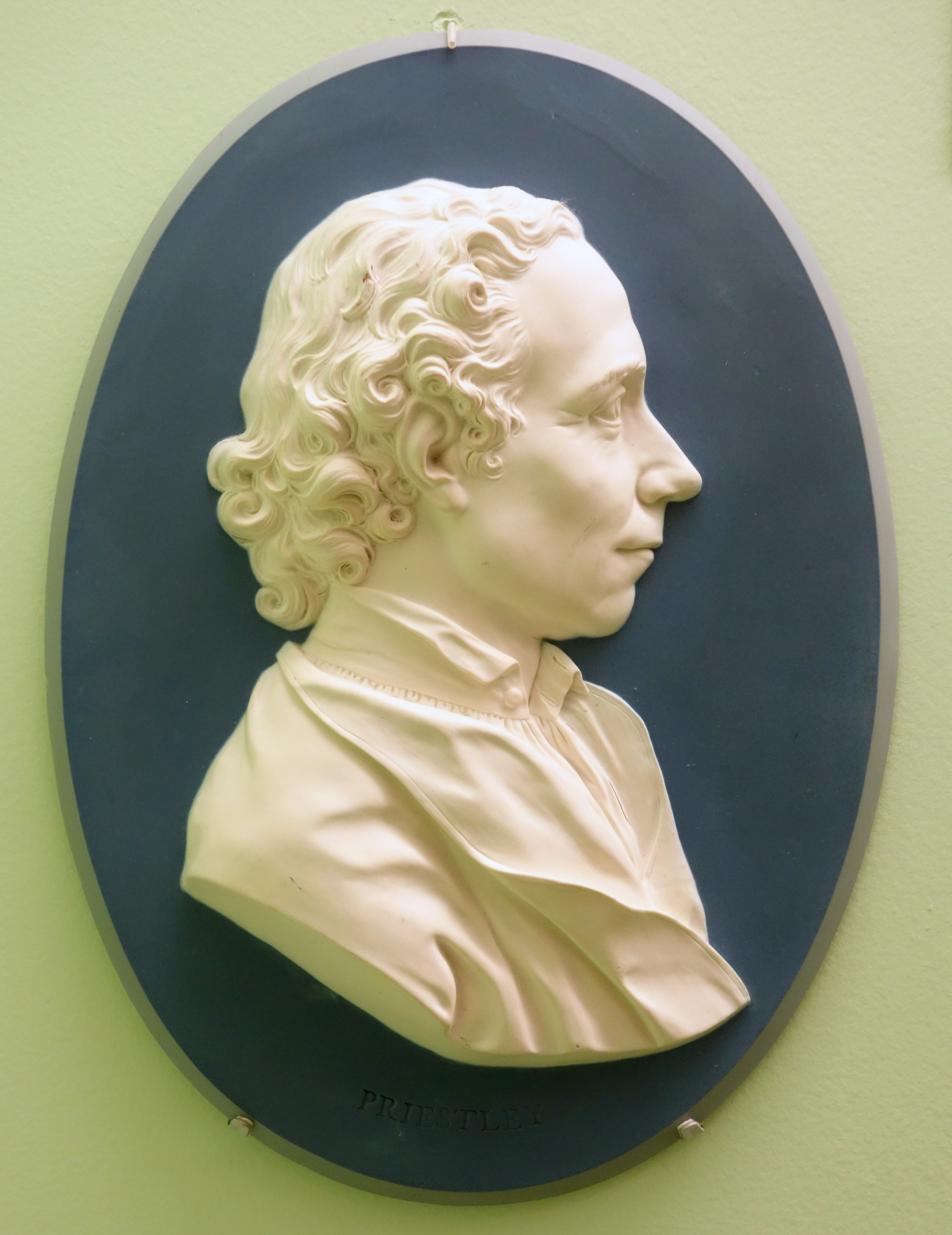
A wedgwood jasperware portrait plaque of Joseph Priestley

Ceracchi exhibited busts at the Royal Academy from 1776 to 1779. He was nominated for membership in the academy but received only four votes. His bust of the academy's president Sir Joshua Reynolds, is in the collection of the Royal Academy of Art. Living in Carlini's lodgings near Soho Square,

Ceracchi modelled architectural ornament and bas-relief panels for Robert Adam, most notably a grand bas-relief of a Sacrifice to Bacchus, fourteen feet long and six feet high, in Adam's patent mastic composition, for the rear façade of Mr. Desenfans' house in Portland Place.

In 1778, Ceracchi sculpted the statues of Temperance and Fortitude cast in Portland stone for the Strand façade of Sir William Chambers' Somerset House, London; Carlini, who modelled the other two classical virtues for the project, was occupied with architectural sculpture for Somerset House over several years and doubtless recommended Ceracchi. As well as the portrait busts he executed in London is a full-length portrait of Anne Seymour Damer, herself a sculptor and to some extent his pupil, in antique robes, with her tools at her feet (British Museum).

He returned to Rome in 1781, but had to leave twice due to his links with the Jacobin movements. He befriended Johann Wolfgang von Goethe during the German poet's Grand Tour in Italy in 1786 - 1788, as they dwelled in the same building in Via del Corso where Ceracchi had his atelier/house. Goethe commissioned him a bust of Johann Joachim Winckelmann and they lived together in Ceracchi's studio for a brief period in 1788.

=== United States ===
Ceracchi made two visits to the United States, in 1790 and again in 1792, following the emergence of the nation after the conclusion of the American Revolutionary War. He hoped to be commissioned to erect an elaborate monument to the new republic and George Washington that he was convinced the new Congress had voted to fund. In 1794, he returned a third time but was unsuccessful in raising the funds for his venture by private subscription. James Madison, a Founding Father, drily remarked that the sculptor "was an enthusiastic worshipper of Liberty and Fame, and his whole soul was bent on securing the latter by rearing a monument to the former". Duplicate letters from Ceracchi to Washington and George Clinton describe plans for a national monument to Washington to be built in Washington, D.C., which was under construction as the nation's new capital.

During his two American visits, he developed heroic portrait busts of leaders of the American Revolution, including Benjamin Franklin (Pennsylvania Academy of Fine Arts), John Jay (Supreme Court, Washington DC), Thomas Jefferson (Monticello), George Washington with a Roman haircut and a toga (Metropolitan Museum of Art, George Clinton, again presented as a noble Roman (twice, Boston Atheneum and New-York Historical Society), and Alexander Hamilton. Most of his prominent subjects sat to him to encourage his art, but none could be found to pay for their busts after the fact. George Washington politely refused the gift of his Roman bust.

At the request of artist Charles Willson Peale, Ceracchi was invited along with 30 artists to the Museum rooms at Philosophical Hall in Philadelphia on December 29, 1794, where he signed an agreement to create "The Columbianum, or American Academy of the Fine Arts." The organization was short-lived, but served as a precursor of the present-day Pennsylvania Academy of Fine Arts in Philadelphia, which was founded in 1805 and remains one of the nation's most elite fine arts academies.

=== Italy ===
He returned to Florence about 1794. In Rome he entered with fiery vehemence into the projected Italian Republic under revolutionary French auspices, when Joseph Bonaparte arrived in the city in 1797, drawing Jacobin sympathizers to him. In the Jacobin riots in December 1797, during which brigadier-general Mathurin-Léonard Duphot was killed, Ceracchi was noted as a leader of the rioters; events led directly from Duphot's death to the Directoire's decision to occupy the city. French troops arrived on 10 February 1798 and on the 15th the Republic of Rome was proclaimed.

== France ==
In 1799, Ceracchi moved to Paris, where he sculpted the portrait bust of Pope Pius VI (Residenzmuseum, Munich; Palazzo Bianco, Genoa).

=== Arrest and execution ===
Having sculpted a bust of Napoleon Bonaparte (now in the Fine Arts Museum of Nantes), he became disillusioned after the coup d'état of 18 Brumaire to the extent that he was embroiled in the paranoid and furious reaction of Napoleon to the plot of the Rue Saint-Nicaise, an attempt against Napoleon's life in which a device dubbed the "machine infernal" was exploded, with loss of innocent life.

Ceracchi was arrested for his alleged participation in the Conspiration des poignards and guillotined on 30 January 1801, at the age of 49.

== Gallery ==
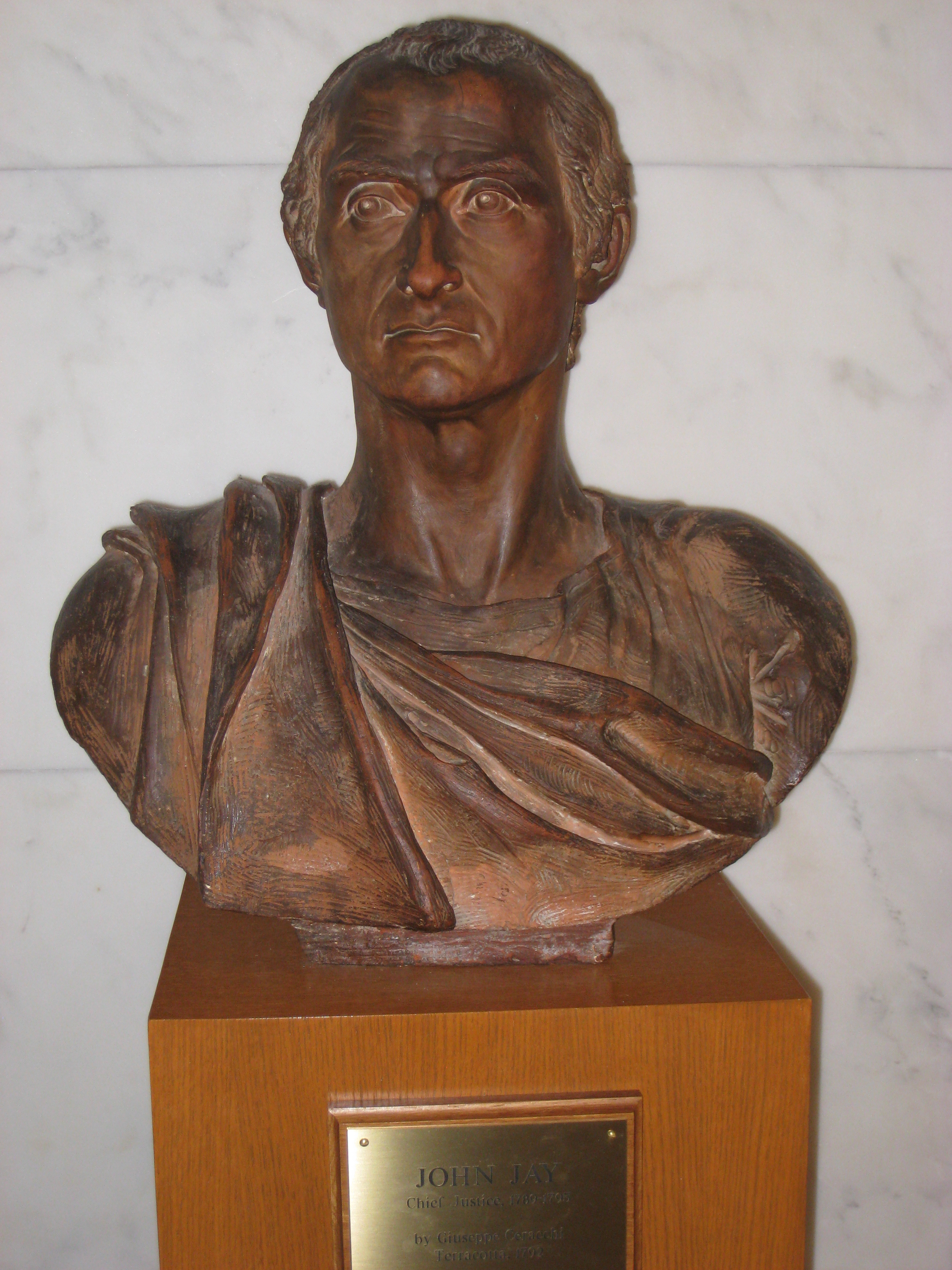
Ceracchi's bust of Founding Father John Jay on display in the U.S. Supreme Court in Washington, D.C.

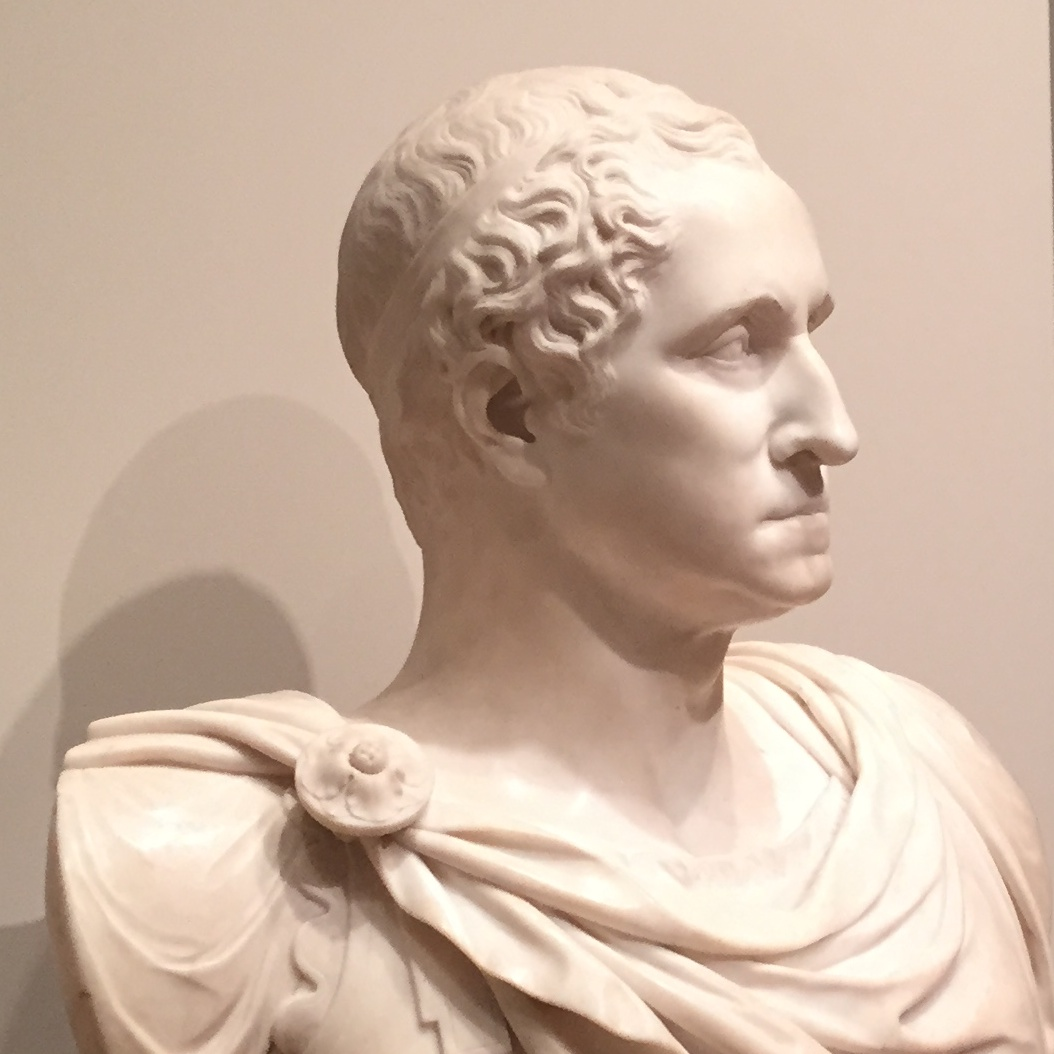
Ceracchi's 1795 marble bust of George Washington on display at the Metropolitan Museum of Art in New York City

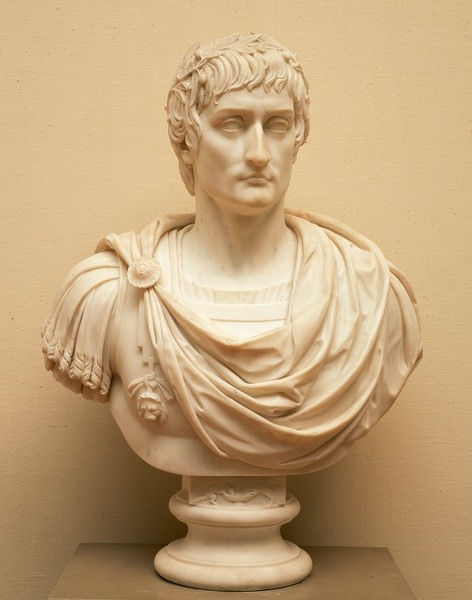
Ceracchi's 1810 marble bust of Napoleon, completed by Francesco Laboureur, on display at Musée d'Arts de Nantes in Nantes, France

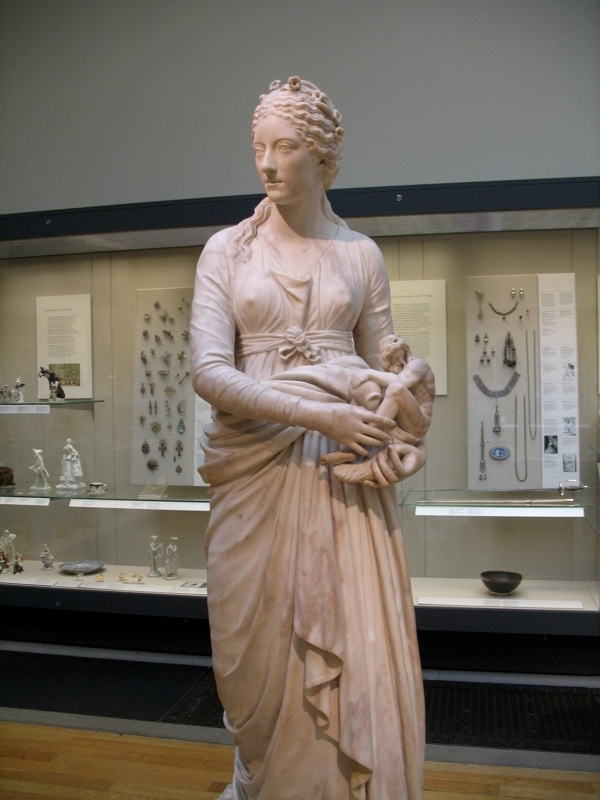
Ceracchi's statue of English sculptor Anne Seymour Damer on display at the British Museum in London

== See also ==
- Alexander Hamilton (Ceracchi)
- George Washington (Ceracchi)
- Conspiration des poignards

== Bibliography ==
- Gardner, Alvert Ten Eyck (March 1948). "Fragment of a Lost Monument" (PDF). The Metropolitan Museum of Art Bulletin. 6 (7): 189–197. doi:10.2307/3258120. JSTOR 3258120.
