= Joseph Fouché =

French statesman, revolutionary and police chief (1763–1820)

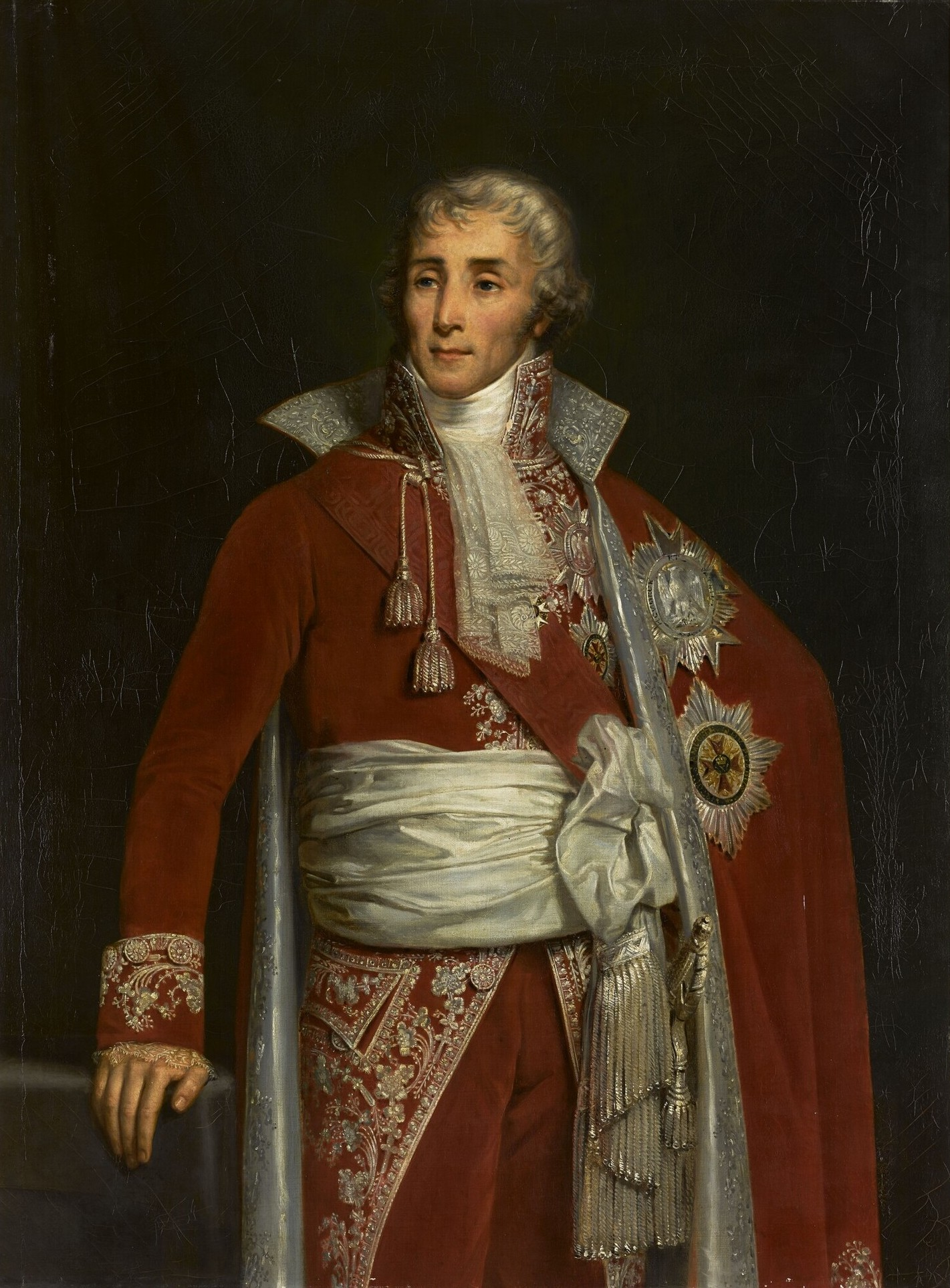
- Portrait as Minister of Police by Claude-Marie Dubufe, after an original by René Théodore Berthon

President of the Executive Commission
- In office 22 June 1815 – 7 July 1815
- Monarch: Napoleon II
- Preceded by: Office created
- Succeeded by: Office abolished (Talleyrand as Prime Minister)

Regent of France
- In office 22 June - 7 July 1815 Serving with Marie Louise, Duchess of Parma
- Monarch: Napoleon II

Minister of Police
- In office 20 July 1799 – 3 June 1810
- Preceded by: Claude Sébastien Bourguignon-Dumolard
- Succeeded by: Anne Jean Marie René Savary
- In office 20 March 1815 – 22 June 1815
- Preceded by: Jules Anglès
- Succeeded by: Jean, comte Pelet de la Lozère
- In office 7 July 1815 – 26 September 1815
- Preceded by: Jean, comte Pelet de la Lozère
- Succeeded by: Élie, duc Decazes

Deputy of the National Convention
- In office 20 September 1792 – 2 November 1795
- Constituency: Nantes

Personal details
- Born: 21 May 1759 Le Pellerin, Kingdom of France
- Died: 26 December 1820 (aged 61) Trieste, Austrian Empire (now Italy)
- Party: Jacobin (1789–1795); Girondist (1792–1793); Montagnard (1793–1794); Thermidorian (1794–1799); Bonapartist (1799–1815)

Joseph Fouché, 1st Duke d'Otrante, 1st Count Fouché (French: [ʒozɛf fuʃe]; 21 May 1759 – 26 December 1820) was a French statesman, revolutionary, and Minister of Police under First Consul Napoleon Bonaparte. Fouché later became a subordinate of Emperor Napoleon. He was particularly known for the ferocity with which he suppressed the Lyon insurrection during the Revolution in 1793. But he also was a highly competent minister of police under the Directory, the Consulate, and the Empire. In 1815, he served as President of the Executive Commission, which was the provisional government of France installed after the abdication of Napoleon.

== Youth ==
Fouché was born in Le Pellerin, a small village near Nantes. His mother was Marie Françoise Croizet (1720–1793), and his father was Julien Joseph Fouché (1719–1771). He was educated at the college of the Oratorians at Nantes, and showed aptitude for literary and scientific studies. Wanting to become a teacher, he was sent to an institution kept by brethren of the same order in Paris. There he made rapid progress, and was soon appointed to tutorial duties at the colleges of Niort, Saumur, Vendôme, Juilly and Arras. There he was initiated into Freemasonry at "Sophie Madeleine" lodge in 1788. At Arras he had had some encounters with Maximilien Robespierre (and his sister Charlotte) both before the revolution and in the early days of the French Revolution (1789).

In October 1790, he was transferred by the Oratorians to their college at Nantes, in an attempt to control his advocacy of revolutionary principles – however, Fouché became even more of a democrat. His talents and anti-clericalism brought him into favour with the population of Nantes, especially after he became a leading member of the local Jacobin Club. When the college of the Oratorians was dissolved in May 1792, Fouché left the Oratorians, having never taken any major vows.

== A revolutionary republican ==
After the downfall of the monarchy on 10 August 1792 (following the storming of the royal Tuileries Palace), he was elected as deputy for the département of the Loire-Inférieure to the National Convention, which proclaimed the French Republic on 22 September.

Fouché's interests brought him into contact with the Marquis de Condorcet and the Girondists, and he became a Girondist himself. However, their lack of support for the trial and execution of King Louis XVI (December 1792 – 21 January 1793) led him to join the Jacobins, the more decided partisans of revolutionary doctrine. Fouché was strongly in favor of the king's immediate execution, and denounced those who "wavered before the shadow of a king".

The crisis that resulted from the declaration of war by the French National Convention against Great Britain and the Dutch Republic (1 February 1793, see French Revolutionary Wars), and a little later against Spain, made Fouché famous as one of the Jacobin radicals holding power in Paris. While the armies of the First Coalition threatened the north-east of France, a revolt of the Royalist peasants in Brittany and La Vendée menaced the Convention on the west. That body sent Fouché with a colleague, Villers, as representatives on mission invested with almost dictatorial powers for the crushing of the revolt of "the whites" (the royalist colour). The ruthlessness with which he carried out these duties earned him a reputation, and he soon held the post of commissioner of the republic in the département of the Nièvre.

Together with Pierre Gaspard Chaumette, he helped to initiate the dechristianization movement in the autumn of 1793. In the Nièvre department, Fouché ransacked churches, sent their valuables to the treasury, and helped establish the Cult of Reason. He ordered the words "Death is an eternal sleep" to be inscribed over the gates to cemeteries. He also fought luxury and wealth, wanting to abolish the use of currency. The new cult was inaugurated at Notre Dame de Paris by "The Festival of Reason". It was here that Fouché gave "the most famous example of its [dechristianization] early phase". Ironically enough, it was only a year previous that Fouché had been "an advocate of the role of the clergy in education," yet he was now "abandoning the role of religion in society altogether in favour of 'the revolutionary and clearly philosophical spirit' he had first wanted for education." Overall, the dechristianization movement "reflected the wholesale transformation that Jacobin and radical leaders were beginning to see as necessary for the survival of the Republic, and the creation of a republican citizenry."

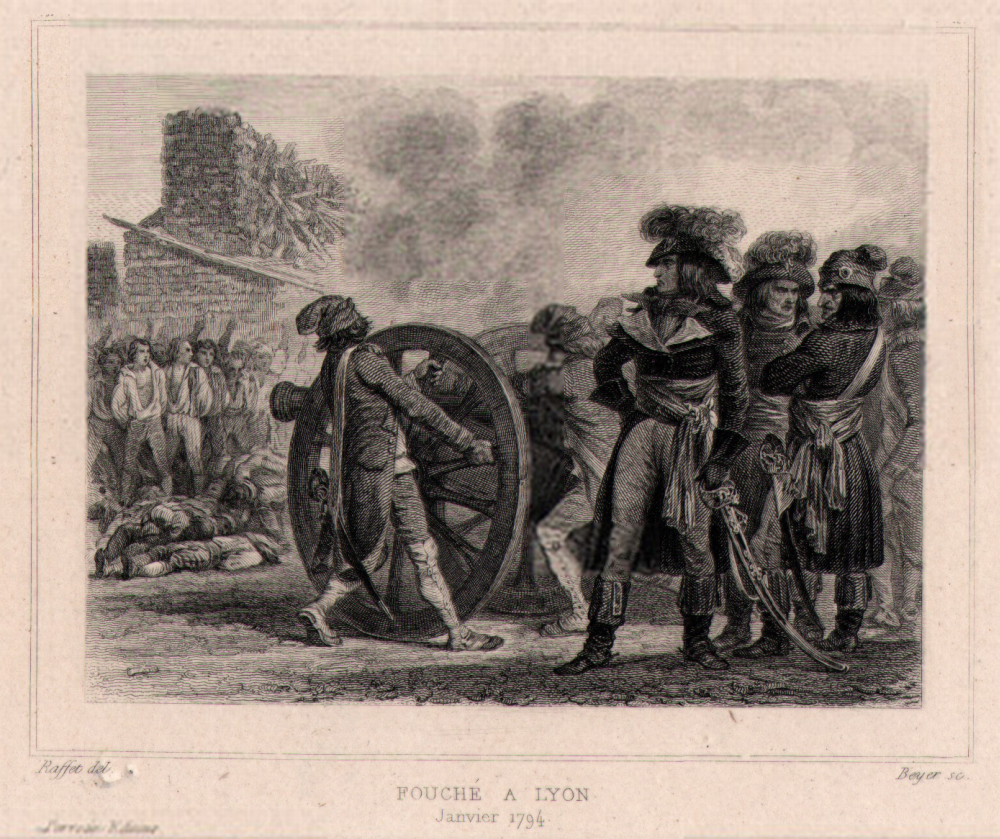
Fouché in Lyon, January 1794

Fouché went on to Lyon in November with Jean-Marie Collot d'Herbois to execute the reprisals of the Convention. Lyon had revolted against the Convention. Lyon, on 23 November, was declared to be in a "state of revolutionary war" by Collot and Fouché. The two men then formed the Temporary Commission for Republican Supervision. He inaugurated his mission with a festival notable for its obscene parody of religious rites. Fouché and Collot then brought in "a contingent of almost two thousand of the Parisian Revolutionary Army" to begin their terrorizing. "On 4 December, 60 men, chained together, were blasted with grapeshot on the plain de Brotteaux outside the city, and 211 more the following day. Grotesquely ineffective, these mitraillades resulted in heaps of mutilated, screaming, half-dead victims, who were finished off with sabres and musket fire by soldiers physically sickened at the task." Events like this made Fouché infamous as "The Executioner of Lyons." The Commission was not happy with the methods used for killing the rebels so, soon after, "more normal firing squads supplemented the guillotine." These methods led to the carrying out of "over 1800 executions in the coming months." Fouché, claiming that "Terror, salutary terror, is now the order of the day here ... We are causing much impure blood to flow, but it is our duty to do so, it is for humanity's sake," called for the execution of 1,905 citizens. As Napoleon's biographer Alan Schom has written:

Alas, Fouché's enthusiasm had proved a little too effective, for when the blood from the mass executions in the center of Lyons gushed from severed heads and bodies into the streets, drenching the gutters of the Rue Lafont, the vile-smelling red flow nauseated the local residents, who irately complained to Fouché and demanded payment for damages. Fouché, sensitive to their outcry, obliged them by ordering the executions moved out of the city to the Brotteaux field, along the Rhône.

From late 1793 until spring 1794, every day "batch after batch of bankers, scholars, aristocrats, priests, nuns, and wealthy merchants and their wives, mistresses, and children" were taken from the city jails to Brotteaux field, tied to stakes, and dispatched by firing squads or mobs. Outwardly, Fouché's conduct was marked by the utmost savagery, and on his return to Paris early in April 1794, he thus characterised his policy: "The blood of criminals fertilises the soil of liberty and establishes power on sure foundations".

== Conflict with Robespierre ==
Robespierre was appalled by the atrocities Fouché committed while on mission. In addition, early in June 1794, at the time of the "Festival of the Supreme Being", Fouché went so far as to mock the theistic revival. Robespierre exchanged angry communications with him, then tried to expel Fouché from the Jacobin Club on 14 July 1794. Fouché, however, was working with his usual energy and plotted Robespierre's overthrow from behind the scenes while remaining in hiding in Paris. Because Robespierre was losing his influence and because Fouché was under the protection of Barras, Fouché ultimately survived Robespierre's final wave of purges.

The remaining ultraleftists (Collot d'Herbois, Billaud-Varenne), and the moderates (Bourdon de l'Oise, Fréron) who had won the support of the nonaligned majority of the Convention (Marais), also opposed Robespierre. Fouché engineered Robespierre's overthrow, culminating in the dramatic Coup of the 9th Thermidor on 28 July 1794. Fouché is reported to have worked furiously on the overthrow:

Rising at early morn he would run round till night calling on deputies of all shades of opinion, saying to each and every one, "You perish tomorrow if he [Robespierre] does not".

Fouché describes his activities in this way in his memoirs:

Being recalled to Paris, I dared to call upon [Robespierre] from the tribune, to make good his accusation. He caused me to be expelled from the Jacobins, of whom he was the high-priest; this was for me equivalent to a decree of proscription. I did not trifle in contending for my head, nor in long and secret deliberations with such of my colleagues as were threatened with my own fate. I merely said to them ... 'You are on the list, you are on the list as well as myself; I am certain of it!'

Fouché, as both a ruthless suppressor of Federalist rebellion and one of the key architects of Robespierre's overthrow, embodied the merciless French politics of the republic era.

== Directory ==
The ensuing movement in favour of more merciful methods of government threatened to sweep away the group of politicians who had been mainly instrumental in carrying through the coup d'état. Nonetheless, largely because of Fouché's intrigues, they remained in power for a time after July. This also brought divisions in the Thermidor group, which soon became almost isolated, with Fouché spending all his energy on countering the attacks of the moderates. He was himself denounced by François Antoine de Boissy d'Anglas on 9 August 1795, which caused his arrest, but the Royalist rebellion of 13 Vendémiaire Year IV aborted his execution, and he was released in the amnesty which followed the proclamation of the Constitution of 5 Fructidor.

In the ensuing Directory government (1795–1799), Fouché remained at first in obscurity, but the relations he had with the far left, once headed by Chaumette and now by François-Noël Babeuf, helped him to rise once more. He is said to have betrayed Babeuf's plot of 1796 to the Director Paul Barras; however, later research tended to throw doubt on the assertion.

His rise from poverty was slow, but in 1797 he gained an appointment dealing with military supplies, which offered considerable opportunities for making money. After first offering his services to the Royalists, whose movement was then gathering force, he again decided to support the Jacobins and Barras. In Charles-Pierre Augereau's anti-Royalist coup d'état of Fructidor 1797, Fouché offered his services to Barras, who in 1798 appointed him French ambassador to the Cisalpine Republic. In Milan, he was judged so high-handed that he was removed, but he was able for a time to hold his own and to intrigue successfully against his successor.

Early in 1799, he returned to Paris, and after a brief stint as ambassador at The Hague, he became minister of police at Paris on 20 July 1799. The newly elected director, Emmanuel-Joseph Sieyès, wanted to curb the excesses of the Jacobins, who had recently reopened their club. Fouché closed the Jacobin Club in a daring manner, hunting down those pamphleteers and editors, whether Jacobins or Royalists, who were influential critics of the government, so that at the time of the return of general Napoleon Bonaparte from the Egyptian campaign (October 1799), the ex-Jacobin was one of the most powerful men in France.

== In Napoleon's service ==
Knowing the unpopularity of the Directors, Fouché joined Bonaparte and Sieyès, who were plotting the Directory's overthrow. His activity in furthering the 18 Brumaire coup (9–10 November 1799) ensured him the favor of Bonaparte, who kept him in office.

In the ensuing French Consulate (1799–1804), Fouché efficiently countered the opposition to Bonaparte. He helped increase centralization and efficiency of the police in both Paris and the provinces. Fouché was careful to temper Napoleon's more arbitrary actions, which at times won him the gratitude even of the royalists. While exposing an unrealistic intrigue in which the duchesse de Guiche Ida d'Orsay was the chief agent, Fouché took care that she should escape.

Equally skilful was his action in the so-called Aréna-Ceracchi plot (Conspiration des poignards), in which agents provocateurs of the police were believed to have played a sinister part. The chief "conspirators" were easily ensnared and were executed when the Plot of the Rue Saint-Nicaise (December 1800) enabled Bonaparte to act with rigour. This far more serious attempt (in which conspirators exploded a bomb near the First Consul's carriage with results disastrous to the bystanders) was soon seen by Fouché as the work of Royalists. When Napoleon showed himself eager to blame the still powerful Jacobins, Fouché firmly declared that he would not only assert but would prove that the outrage was the work of Royalists. However, his efforts failed to avert the Bonaparte-led repression of the leading Jacobins.

In other matters (especially in that known as the Plot of the Placards in the spring of 1802), Fouché was thought to have saved the Jacobins from the vengeance of the Consulate, and Bonaparte decided to rid himself of a man who had too much power to be desirable as a subordinate. On the proclamation of Bonaparte as First Consul for life (1 August 1802) Fouché was deprived of his office, a blow softened by the suppression of the ministry of police and by the assignment of most of its duties to an extended Ministry of Justice. Napoleon was, in fact, so intimidated by his minister of police that he did not dismiss the man personally, sending instead a servant with the information that – in addition to getting 35,000 yearly francs income as a senator and a piece of land worth 30,000 francs a year – he would also receive over a million francs from the reserve funds of the police.

After 1802, he went back to freemasonry, attending "Les Citoyens réunis" lodge in Melun. Cambacérès who was Deputy Grand Master of Grand Orient de France, helped him becoming Conservator of the "Grande Loge symbolique Générale" attached to the Supreme Council of France, where he would be in charge of Masonic Justice. There he could find a valuable source of information on Freemasons throughout the empire.

Fouché did become a senator and took half of the reserve funds of the police which had accumulated during his tenure of office. He continued, however, to intrigue through his spies, who tended to have more information than that of the new minister of police, and competed successfully for the favor of Napoleon at the time of the Georges Cadoudal-Charles Pichegru conspiracy (February–March 1804), becoming instrumental in the arrest of the Duc d'Enghien. Fouché would later say of Enghien's subsequent execution, "It was worse than a crime; it was a mistake" (a remark also frequently attributed to Talleyrand).

After the proclamation of the First French Empire, Fouché again became head of the re-constituted ministry of police (July 1804), and later of Internal Affairs, with activities as important as those carried out under the Consulate. His police agents were omnipresent, and the terror which Napoleon and Fouché inspired partly accounts for the absence of conspiracies after 1804. After the Battle of Austerlitz (December 1805), Fouché uttered the famous words: "Sire, Austerlitz has shattered the old aristocracy; the Faubourg Saint-Germain no longer conspires".

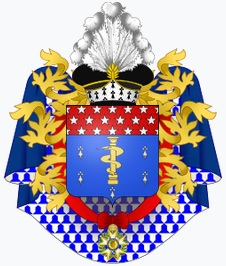
Joseph Fouché's coat of arms as Duke of Otranto

Nevertheless, Napoleon did retain feelings of distrust, or even of fear, towards Fouché, as was proven by his conduct in the early days of 1808. While engaged in the campaign of Spain, the emperor heard rumours that Fouché and Charles Maurice de Talleyrand, once bitter enemies, were having meetings in Paris during which Joachim Murat, King of Naples, had been approached. At once he hurried to Paris, but found nothing to incriminate Fouché. In that year Fouché received the title of Duke of Otranto, which Bonaparte created – under the French name Otrante – a duché grand-fief (a rare, hereditary, but nominal honor) in the satellite Kingdom of Naples.

When, during the absence of Napoleon in the Austrian campaign of 1809, the British Walcheren expedition threatened the safety of Antwerp, Fouché issued an order to the préfet of the northern départements of the Empire for the mobilization of 60,000 National Guards, adding to the order this statement: "Let us prove to Europe that although the genius of Napoleon can throw lustre on France, his presence is not necessary to enable us to repulse the enemy". The emperor's approval of the measure was no less marked than his disapproval of Fouché's words.

The next months brought further friction between emperor and minister. The latter, knowing Napoleon's desire for peace at the close of 1809, undertook to make secret overtures to the British cabinet of Spencer Perceval. Napoleon opened negotiations only to find that Fouché had forestalled him. His rage against his minister was extreme, and on 3 June 1810 he dismissed him from his office. However, Napoleon never completely disgraced a man who might again be useful, and Fouché received the governorship of the Rome département. At the moment of his departure, Fouché took the risk of not surrendering to Napoleon all of certain important documents of his former ministry (falsely declaring that the some had been destroyed); the emperor's anger was renewed, and Fouché, on learning of this after his arrival to Florence, prepared to sail to the United States.

Compelled by the weather and intense sea-sickness to put back into port, he found a mediator in Elisa Bonaparte, Grand Duchess of Tuscany, thanks to whom he was allowed to settle in Aix-en-Provence. He eventually returned to his domain of Point Carré. In 1812 he attempted in vain to turn Napoleon from the projected invasion of Russia, and on the return of the emperor in haste from Smarhoń to Paris at the close of that year, the ex-minister of police was suspected of involvement in the conspiracy of Claude François de Malet, which had been unexpectedly successful.

Fouché cleared his name and gave the emperor useful advice concerning internal affairs and the diplomatic situation. Nevertheless, the emperor, still distrustful, ordered him to undertake the government of the Illyrian provinces. On the break-up of the Napoleonic system in Germany (October 1813), Fouché was ordered on missions to Rome and thence to Naples, in order to watch the movements of Joachim Murat. Before Fouché arrived in Naples, Murat invaded the Roman territory, whereupon Fouché received orders to return to France. He arrived in Paris on 10 April 1814 at the time when Napoleon was being compelled by his marshals to abdicate.

Fouché's conduct in this crisis was characteristic. As senator he advised the Senate to send a deputation to Charles, comte d'Artois, brother of Louis XVIII, with a view to a reconciliation between the monarchy and the nation. A little later he addressed to Napoleon, then banished to Elba, a letter begging him in the interests of peace and of France to withdraw to the United States. To the new sovereign Louis XVIII he sent an appeal in favour of liberty, and recommending the adoption of measures which would conciliate all interests.

The response to the latter was unsatisfactory, and when he found that there were no hopes of advancement, he entered into relations with conspirators who sought the overthrow of the Bourbons. The Marquis de Lafayette and Louis Nicolas Davout were involved in the issue, but their refusal to take the course desired by Fouché and others led to nothing being done.

== Hundred Days and Bourbon restoration ==
Soon Napoleon escaped from Elba and made his way in triumph to Paris. Shortly before his arrival in Paris (19 March 1815), Louis XVIII sent Fouché an offer of the ministry of police, which he declined: "It is too late; the only plan to adopt is to retreat". He then foiled an attempt by Royalists to arrest him, and on the arrival of Napoleon he received for the third time the portfolio of police. That, however, did not prevent him from entering into secret relations with the Austrian statesman Klemens Wenzel von Metternich in Vienna, his aim being to prepare for all eventualities. Meanwhile, he used all his powers to induce the emperor to democratize his rule, and he is said to have caused the insertion of the words: "the sovereignty resides in the people – it is the source of power" in the declaration of the Conseil d'État. But the autocratic tendencies of Napoleon could not be overridden, and Fouché, seeing the fall of the emperor to be imminent, took measures to expedite it and secure his own interests.

In 1814, Fouché had joined the invading allies and conspired against Napoleon. However, he joined Napoléon again during his return and was police minister during the latter's short-lived reign, the Hundred Days. After Napoléon's ultimate defeat in the Battle of Waterloo, Fouché again started plotting against Napoleon and joined the opposition of the parliament. He headed the provisional government and tried to negotiate with the allies. He probably also aimed at establishing a republic with himself as head of state, with the help of some Republican freemasons. These plans were never realised, and the Bourbons regained power in July 1815. And again, Fouché's services were necessary: as Talleyrand, another notorious intrigant, became the prime minister of the Kingdom of France, Fouché was named his minister of police: so he was a minister of King Louis XVIII, the brother of Louis XVI.

Ironically, Fouché had voted for the death sentence after the trial of Louis XVI. Thus, he belonged to the regicides, and ultra-royalists both within the cabinet and without could hardly tolerate him as a member of the government. Fouché, once a revolutionary using extreme terror against the Bourbon supporters, now initiated a campaign of White Terror against real and imagined enemies of the Royalist restoration (officially directed against those who had plotted and supported Napoléon's return to power). Even Prime Minister Talleyrand disapproved of such practices, including the execution of Michel Ney and compiling proscription lists of other military men and former republican politicians. Famous, or rather infamous, is the conversation between Fouché and Lazare Carnot, who had been interior minister during the Hundred Days:

Carnot: "Where should I go then, traitor?"
Fouché: "Go where you want, imbecile!"

Fouché was soon relegated to the post of French ambassador in Saxony; Talleyrand himself lost his portfolio soon after, having been Prime Minister from 9 July to 26 September 1815. In 1816, the royalist authorities found Fouché's further services useless, and he was proscribed as a regicide. Fouché settled first in Prague, then in Linz, and finally in Trieste; his considerable wealth allowed him to live comfortably, and he spent his time writing his memoirs and seeing to the upbringing and education of his children. He died in 1820 and is now buried in Ferrières-en-Brie.

History's verdict upon Fouché is perhaps best summed up by John Holland Rose:

Despised by all for his tergiversations, he nevertheless was sought by all on account of his cleverness. He repaid the contempt of his superiors and the adulation of his inferiors by a mask of impenetrable reserve or scorn. He sought for power and neglected no means to make himself serviceable to the party whose success appeared to be imminent. Yet, while appearing to be the servant of the victors, present or prospective, he never gave himself to any one party. In this versatility he resembles Talleyrand, of whom he was a coarse replica. Both professed, under all their shifts and turns, to be desirous of serving France. Talleyrand certainly did so in the sphere of diplomacy; Fouché may occasionally have done so in the sphere of intrigue.

== Works ==
Fouché wrote some political pamphlets and reports, the chief of which are:

- Réflexions sur le jugement de Louis Capet ("Thoughts on the trial of Louis Capet", 1793)
- Réflexions sur l'éducation publique ("Thoughts on public education", 1793)
- Rapport et projet de loi relatif aux collèges ("Report and law project regarding colleges", 1793)
- Rapport sur la situation de Commune Affranchie Lyons ("Report on the situation of the breakaway commune of Lyon", 1794)
- Lettre aux préfets concernant les prêtres, etc. ("Letter to the préfets regarding priests etc.", 1801)
- The letters of 1815 noted above, and a Lettre au duc de Wellington ("Letter to the Duke of Wellington", 1817)
- 1816 – Notice sur le duc d'Otrante : extraite et traduite de l'ouvrage allemand, sous le titre: "Zeitgenossen" c.à.d. "Nos contemporains celèbres", no. III
- 1816 – Fouché de Nantes, sa vie privée
- 1824 – Mémoires de Joseph Fouché, duc d'Otrante, ministre de la police générale
- 1998 – Ecrits révolutionnaires. Paris: Paris-Zanzibar ISBN 2-911314-10-7

== Family ==
Joseph Fouché, 1st Duc d'Otrante, was a son of Julien Joseph Fouché (1719–1771) and wife Marie Françoise Croizet (1720–1793).

By his first marriage in September 1792 to Bonne Jeanne Coiquaud (1 April 1763 – 8 October 1812), he had seven children:

- Nièvre Fouché d'Otrante (10 August 1793 – August 1794).
- Joseph Liberté Fouché d'Otrante, 2nd Duc d'Otrante (22 July 1796 – 31 December 1862), married to Fortunée Collin de Sussy in 1824; they separated shortly after without issue.
- Égalité Fouché d'Otrante (1798), stillborn.
- Fraternité Fouché d'Otrante (1799), stillborn.
- Armand François Cyriac Fouché d'Otrante, 3rd Duc d'Otrante (25 March 1800 – 26 November 1878). Unmarried and without issue.
- Paul Athanase Fouché d'Otrante, 4th Duc d'Otrante (25 June 1801 – 10 February 1886). He later moved to Sweden, where he married twice and left issue, which remained in Sweden.
- Joséphine Ludmille Fouché d'Otrante (29 June 1803 – 30 December 1893), married to Adolphe Comte de La Barthe de Thermes (1789–1869), and had issue (a son, Paul and a daughter, Isabelle).

By his second marriage to Ernestine de Castellane-Majastres (5 July 1788 – 4 May 1850), he had no children.

== In literature and on screen ==
- The Austrian novelist Stefan Zweig wrote a biography entitled Joseph Fouché. Zweig takes a psychological approach to understanding the complicated minister of police. Zweig asks himself in the beginning of the book about how Fouché could "survive" in power from the revolution to the monarchy.
- Fouché also appears as one of the main characters in For the King, a novel by Catherine Delors (Dutton, 2010), where his role in the Plot of the Rue Saint-Nicaise is discussed.
- Fouché was featured as one of the two main (and only) characters in the play by Jean-Claude Brisville Supping with the Devil in which he is depicted dining with Talleyrand while deciding how to preserve their respective powers under the coming regime. The drama was hugely successful and turned into a film The Supper in 1992 directed by Édouard Molinaro, starring Claude Rich and Claude Brasseur.
- Joseph Conrad portrayed Fouché briefly in his short story The Duel (1924), which was filmed in 1977 as The Duellists, written by Gerald Vaughan-Hughes and directed by Ridley Scott. Fouché is portrayed by Albert Finney.
- Fouché appears as a recurring character in the Roger Brook series of historical novels by Dennis Wheatley.
- Fouché is referenced on the first page of the novel Perfume: The Story of a Murderer by Patrick Süskind as a 'gifted abomination'.
- Fouché is an important character in the novel The Hastening Wind by British novelist Edward Grierson, which concerns the Cadoudal conspiracy to assassinate Napoleon in 1804.
- In Mountolive (1958), the third novel of Lawrence Durrell's Alexandria Quartet, a French diplomat is said to have (ironically) complimented the cruel and venal Egyptian Minister of the Interior, Memlik Pasha, by telling him that he is "regarded as the best Minister of Interior in modern history – indeed, since Fouché there has been no-one to equal you." Memlik is so taken with the comparison that he orders a bust of Fouché from France, which then sits in his reception room gathering dust.
- In Bernard Cornwell's novel Sharpe's Enemy, Fouché is mentioned as an early mentor of the French spymaster Pierre Ducos, who becomes a bitter enemy of Richard Sharpe in later novels.
- Fouché makes an appearance in the Doctor Who novel World Game by Terrance Dicks.
- Fouché appears in the novel The Twisted Sword, by Winston Graham.
- The novel Captain Cut-Throat by John Dickson Carr, set in Napoleonic France in 1805, when the invasion of England was planned, portrays Fouché scheming and counter-scheming various complicated plots.
- Fouché is a significant character in The Carton Chronicles: The Curious Tale of Flashman's True Father (2010) by Keith Laidler.
- Fouché was portrayed by French actor Gérard Depardieu in the mini-series Napoleon.
- Fouché was portrayed by actor Stephen Jenn in the 1987 mini-series Napoleon and Josephine: A Love Story.
- In the Hollywood historical drama Reign of Terror (1949), Fouché is played by Arnold Moss.
- He is a character in Treason's Tide by Robert Wilton, set during the summer of 1805. Originally published as The Emperor's Gold in June 2011, it was re-issued under the new title in February 2013 by Corvus, an imprint of Atlantic Books.
- Fouché is portrayed by Morris Perry in the BBC's War and Peace episode 11, "Men of Destiny."
- Fouché is mentioned in Diary of a Man in Despair by Friedrich Reck-Malleczewen. Reck relates a meeting with Heinrich Himmler in 1934 at which Himmler asks Reck for information. Surprised at Himmler's request, Reck asks Himmler why the Fouché of the Third Reich needed information from him. Reck relates that Himmler clearly had no idea who Fouché was.
- The 48 Laws of Power cites him as an example of following Rule #35: Master The Art Of Timing.
- He is a character in The Paris Affair by Teresa Grant.
- Fouché appears in Alexandre Dumas novel The Knight of Sainte-Hermine as a sponsor of the title character's adventures.
