= Napoleonic studies =

Field of historical research

Napoleonic studies (French: Études Napoléoniennes; Russian: Наполеоновские исследования) is the field of historical research devoted to Napoleon and the Napoleonic era (1799–1815), encompassing the time period from the French Revolution through the Napoleonic Wars.

== About ==
Napoleonic studies is a speciality at various universities as well as private Napoleonic societies, including the International Napoleonic Society and the Napoleonic Historical Society. Though the history of the Napoleonic era has been extensively studied, the field of Napoleonic studies as a defined area of academia has emerged only in the 21st century.

French historian Jean Tulard, who founded the l'Institut Napoleon at the École Pratique de Hautes Études of Paris-Sorbonne University, has been credited with establishing the field of Napoleonic studies as a serious academic enterprise.
