= Magà Ettori =

French film director

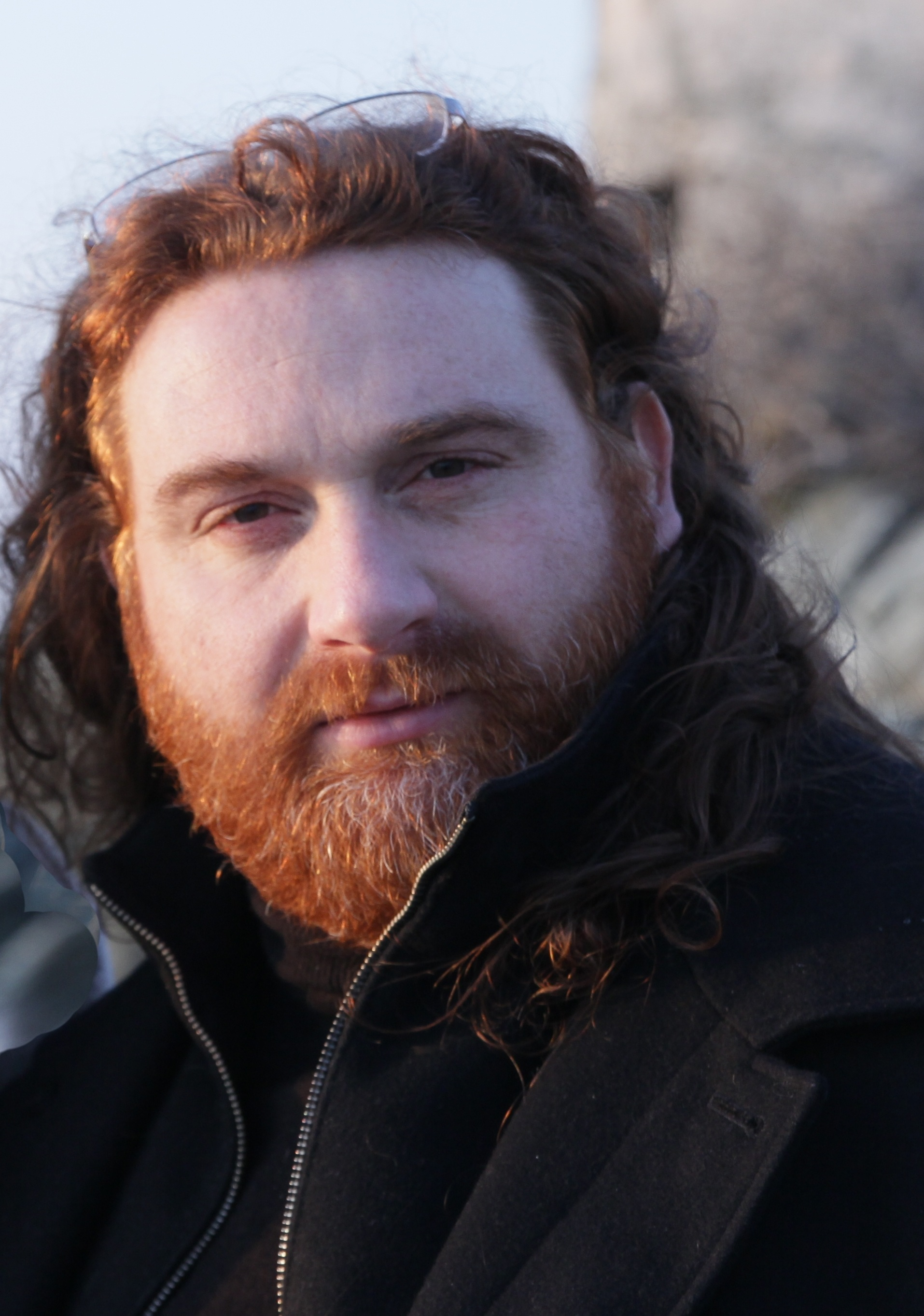
- Born: 15 February 1972 (age 54); Ajaccio, Corsica, France
- Occupation: Filmmaker
- Years active: 1990–present
- Children: 2
- Website: faerylandofficial.wordpress.com

Magà Ettori (born 15 February 1972) is a French filmmaker currently residing in Dublin, Ireland.

== Personal life ==
Married with two children, he married in London for Mayor of Westminster.

== Professional life and activism ==
Magà Ettori did his cinema studies in France at Ecole Supérieure de Réalisation Audiovisuelle (ESRA), studied journalism at the Centre Professionnel de Journalisme (CFJ), languages at Cambridge University and dramatic arts at Conservatoire Maurice Ravel

In 1990, Magà founded and directed "l'Institut Citoyen du Cinéma" which had a goal of supporting politically motivated films. That same year, - at the request of Antoine Bonfanti - he made "Domotica" with Jean Lefebvre as the main actor.

In 2011, Magà Ettori was elected Cinema Advisor at the Conseil Economique Social et Culturel Corse (CESCC). He became involved in the development of New Emerging Cinema in the Mediterranean region with the Anna Lindh Foundation.

From the beginning of his career, Magà Ettori wrote and directed several dozen films. He also created a cultural magazine and a Contemporary Art gallery in Ajaccio which was a double project awarded by the Ministry of Youth and Sports.

Ettori, who defines himself as a citizen of the world and a humanist, adopted a vegan diet in 2012. Along with his cinematographic career, Magà Ettori hosted numerous trainings, conferences, festivals, debates, master classes, workshops and meetings, three colloquiums in the Senate, and one at UNESCO headquarters. He also steered the "Convention of the Animal Rights Activists" and the "Convention of Corsican Culture". Faeryland (2016), of which he is the author, director and performer, is considered to be the first vegan film.

== Awards ==
- Medor for Best film (2016) (fr:Faeryland) – won

=== Films ===
- 1990: Domotica
- 1991: Carrissimu cucinu
- 1993: A mio culomba
- 1993: Ribeddu
- 1994: Nine Sisters
- 1995: OE
- 1996: Corsica Sensations
- 1998: Croce
- 1999: L'occhju
- 2000: Pampasgiolu
- 2001: AE
- 2002: Fiat Lux
- 2003: A dream
- 2003: Clandestinu
- 2003: Corsica Regina
- 2004: Resistenza
- 2004: The Soul
- 2005: Pulitichella
- 2006: A mimoria
- 2006: Babel
- 2008: Et maintenant monsieur Paoli ?
- 2009: Grossu Minutu
- 2009: U borgu
- 2010: L'étrangère
- 2011: I Tercani
- 2011: La Marche de l'enfant roi
- 2011: Lamentu di u Golu
- 2012: l'Astiu
- 2014: Amazing Grace
- 2014: Bad Day
- 2014: Le Dernier Clan
- 2014: Umani
- 2015: Corsica Sera
- 2016: Faeryland
