= Decree of the Abolition of Slavery of April 27, 1848 =

French decree

Decree of April 27, 1848

Second Republic
- Long title: Abolition of slavery throughout the French colonial empire
- Territorial extent: France
- Enacted by: Jacques-Charles Dupont de l'Eure
- Signed: April 27, 1848
- Type of veto: Decree
- Status: Current legislation

The second decree abolishing slavery in France was signed on April 27, 1848, by the Provisional Government of the Second Republic.

The decree was issued 46 years after the reinstatement of slavery under Napoleon. Promoted by Victor Schœlcher, it definitively abolished slavery in French territories, freeing 251,019 people, and provided compensation to former slave owners for the financial losses resulting from emancipation.

== First abolitions of slavery ==
=== In metropolitan France ===
In France, slavery was abolished in the continental kingdom by Louis X through the edict of 3 July 1315, which declared that all individuals are born free and that servants within the kingdom were to be freed. Under this edict, any enslaved person entering the kingdom was granted freedom.

In 1642, King Louis XIII authorized the trade of enslaved Africans, limited to the French Antilles and not applicable to metropolitan France. In 1671, Louis XIV explicitly permitted the triangular trade, allowing the ports of Bordeaux, Nantes, and La Rochelle to participate in the transatlantic slave trade to the colonies. This regulation did not affect the prohibition of slavery in metropolitan France.

The principle of the “Privilege of the Land of France” was challenged in the 18th century, as planters opposed legal precedents granting freedom to enslaved people arriving in metropolitan France. In response to lobbying, declarations issued in 1716, 1738, and 1777 allowed owners to bring enslaved individuals into metropolitan France while retaining their status, provided certain administrative requirements were met, including payment of a tax and registration with the Admiralties.

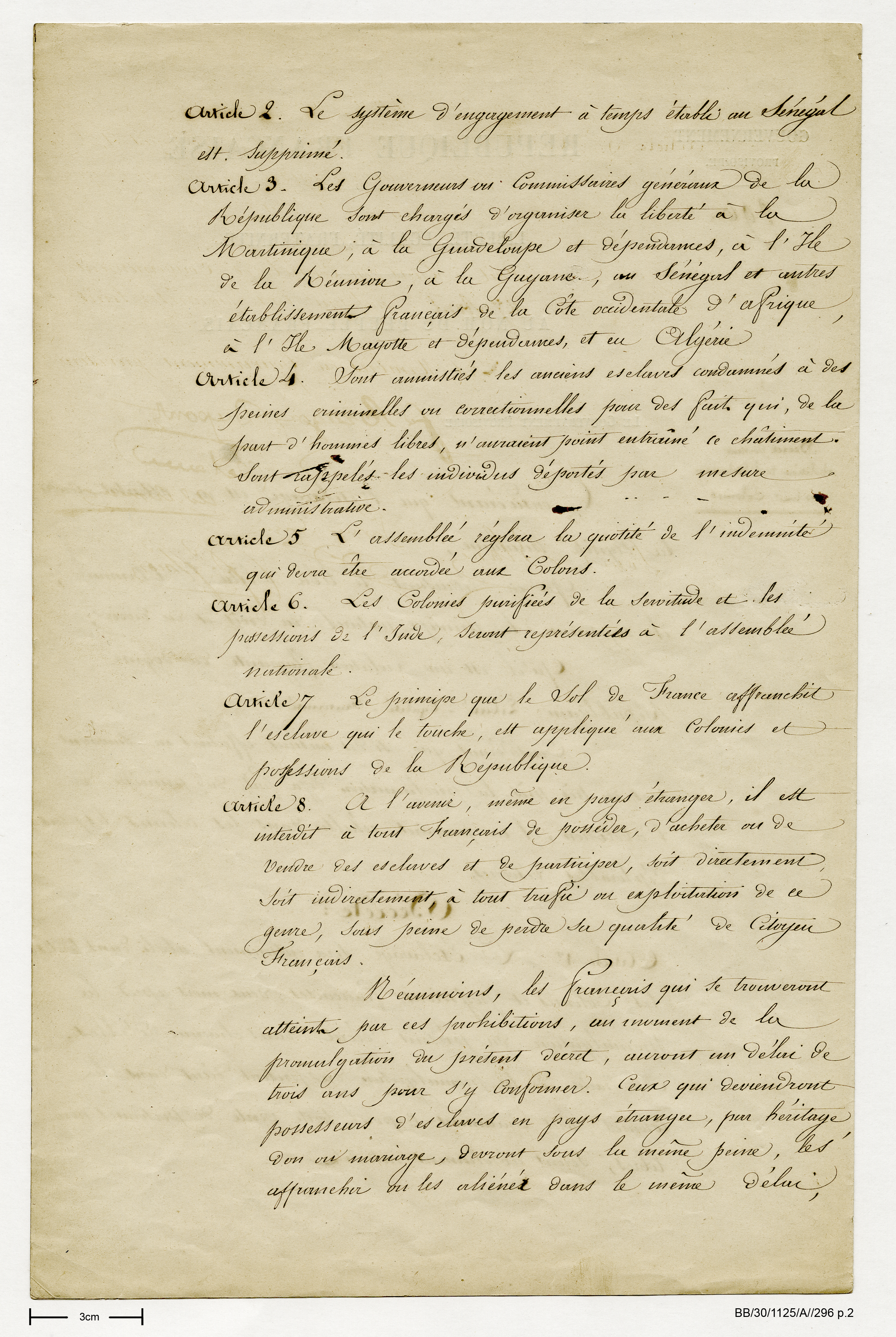
Decree abolishing slavery - National Archives BB-30-1125-A-296 page 3

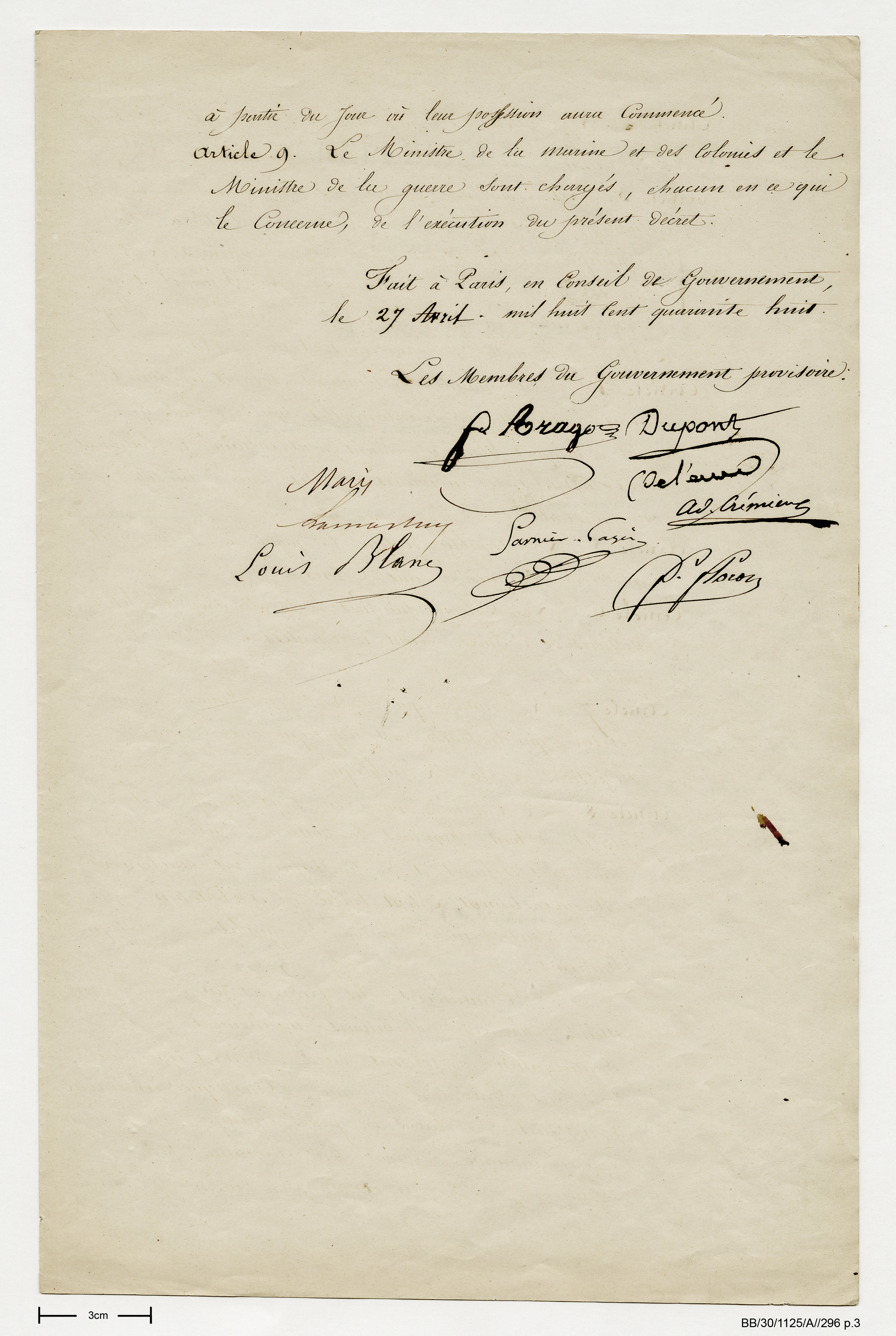
Decree abolishing slavery - National Archives BB-30-1125-A-296 page 3

=== In the colonies ===
In 1791, the Constituent Assembly reinstated the principle of the privilege of the land of France through the law of 28 September, which declared that all individuals were free upon entering France.

The first emancipation of enslaved people in the colonies occurred in Saint-Domingue on 29 August 1793, initiated by Civil Commissioner Sonthonax.

The law of 4 February 1794 (16 Pluviôse Year II) was the first decree to abolish slavery throughout the French colonies, although its implementation was uneven.

The law of 4 February 1794 was repealed by the law of 20 May 1802. Napoleon Bonaparte did not reinstate slavery in Guadeloupe or Guyana immediately, although separate consular decrees later restored it in these colonies on 16 July and 7 December 1802, respectively. Slavery was not reinstated in Saint-Domingue, where abolition was already in effect. However, it was maintained in colonies where the 1794 law had not been enforced due to local opposition, including the Mascarenes (Réunion, Île de France [Mauritius], Rodrigues) and several Caribbean islands recently returned to France by the British under the Peace of Amiens (Martinique, Tobago, Saint Martin, and Saint Lucia).

Following the revolt of enslaved people in Saint-Domingue, Haiti became the first state to officially abolish slavery on its territory.

=== Prohibition of the slave trade ===
At the Congress of Vienna on 8 February 1815, the slave trade—defined as the commerce, purchase, and transport of enslaved people in the colonial empires—was theoretically abolished by the United Kingdom, France, Austria, Prussia, Portugal, Russia, Spain, and Sweden, under British influence from the Quadruple Alliance. The participating countries declared that “the slave trade is repugnant to the general principles of morality and humanity.”

Following his return from Elba in 1815, Napoleon issued a decree abolishing the slave trade, aligning France with the Congress of Vienna’s decision. This resolution was confirmed by the Treaty of Paris on 20 November 1815. Subsequently, the ordinance of 8 January 1817, signed by Louis XVIII, prohibited the slave trade in the French colonies.

The prohibition of the slave trade faced opposition in France, particularly from Atlantic ports such as Bordeaux and Nantes, which sought to resume the trade disrupted since 1793. Although French laws formally prohibited the trade, enforcement was inconsistent. Between 1819 and 1828, officials including the Minister of the Navy, Count Portal, and Prime Minister Count Joseph de Villèle, both with connections to colonial planters, were notably lax in applying the legislation.

Despite official prohibitions, the transatlantic slave trade continued clandestinely in French, Spanish, and Portuguese colonies. In 1820, an estimated 40,000 enslaved people were transported from Africa to the southern United States and Brazil, which imported approximately 20,000 per year between 1820 and 1823, and around 10,000 per year between 1823 and 1852. Because the trade was illegal, conditions during transport were often severe, and enslaved individuals were sometimes thrown overboard to avoid interception by British warships. Awareness of the trade’s human cost grew in Europe, influenced by anti-slavery societies, writers such as André-Daniel Laffon de Ladebat, and organizations like the Committee for the Abolition of the Slave Trade and Slavery. In response, several European governments granted Britain the right to inspect ships in 1831 and 1833, enabling the legal policing of the seas against the slave trade.

== Abolition postponed under the July Monarchy ==
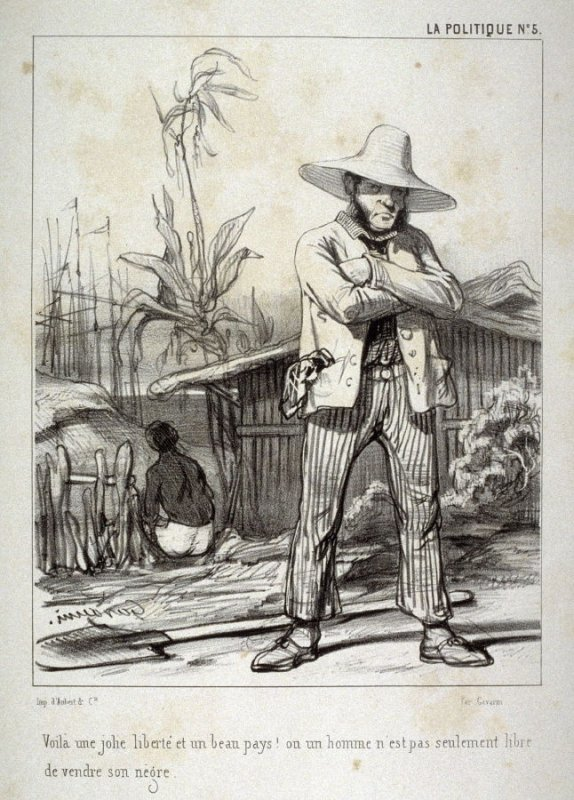
"What a wonderful freedom and a beautiful country! Where a man is not only free to sell his slave." Caricature by Paul Gavarni depicting the exasperation of a slave owner due to the abolitionist measures envisaged by the July Monarchy following the recent abolition in the United Kingdom of Great Britain and Ireland. Lithograph published in Le Figaro in 1839, then reprinted in La Caricature in 1842.

In 1831, the government of Jacques Laffitte, which included members of the Society of Christian Morals, an organization of liberal opponents engaged in the fight against the slave trade, passed the law of 4 March 1831, aimed at its definitive abolition. The law provided for twenty to thirty years of forced labor for those responsible, imprisonment for the ship’s crew, and a seven-year commitment in the colonies for enslaved people freed during the capture of a ship.

=== Adjustment of the servile condition ===
Moderates argued that enslaved people needed to be “prepared for freedom” through education and religious instruction before full emancipation could be granted. Following the adoption of the Mackau laws in 1845, the Duke of Broglie described the legislation as a preparatory measure aimed at improving the conditions of enslaved people in anticipation of eventual freedom.

=== Mackau laws ===
The Mackau laws represent the final legislative measures before the abolition of 1848. Passed in July 1845, they continued the approach of earlier legislation without signaling a direct move toward emancipation. The laws mandated a minimum period of instruction for enslaved people, limited the number of lashes an owner could administer without judicial authorization to fifteen, and allowed married enslaved individuals with different owners to reunite.

In July 1846, King Louis-Philippe I abolished slavery in the royal domains of Martinique and Guadeloupe, as well as on the island of Mayotte, recently acquired by France. Chief Minister François Guizot did not pursue further measures at that time.

=== Uneven implementation ===
The implementation of these measures in the colonies was uneven. During sessions of the Chamber of Deputies, Ledru-Rollin and Agénor de Gasparin opposed the Mackau law project, criticizing successive legislations for remaining largely unenforced. In the colonies, the opening of new schools, for instance, was accompanied by student selection by local authorities, which often excluded enslaved individuals.

== Action in favor of abolition ==
As early as 1831, after a trip to Cuba, Victor Schœlcher argued in the Revue de Paris that enslaved people are human and therefore entitled to freedom. In 1833, in De l'esclavage et de la législation coloniale, he proposed gradual emancipation to prevent potential social unrest and to allow enslaved people to gain economic and intellectual autonomy. In 1838, participating in a literary competition organized by the Société de morale chrétienne, he advocated immediate emancipation without a transitional period. Following his journey to the Antilles in 1840–1841, he published Colonies françaises, abolition immédiate de l'esclavage, addressing planters and proposing the substitution of beet sugar for cane sugar.

The abolitionist movement was also reflected in cultural works, including the 1842 comic opera Le Code noir.

In April 1847, the Société de morale chrétienne conducted a petition campaign that collected 11,000 signatures, including those of three bishops, nineteen vicars general, over 850 priests, nearly ninety consistory presidents or pastors, and approximately 6,000 merchants.

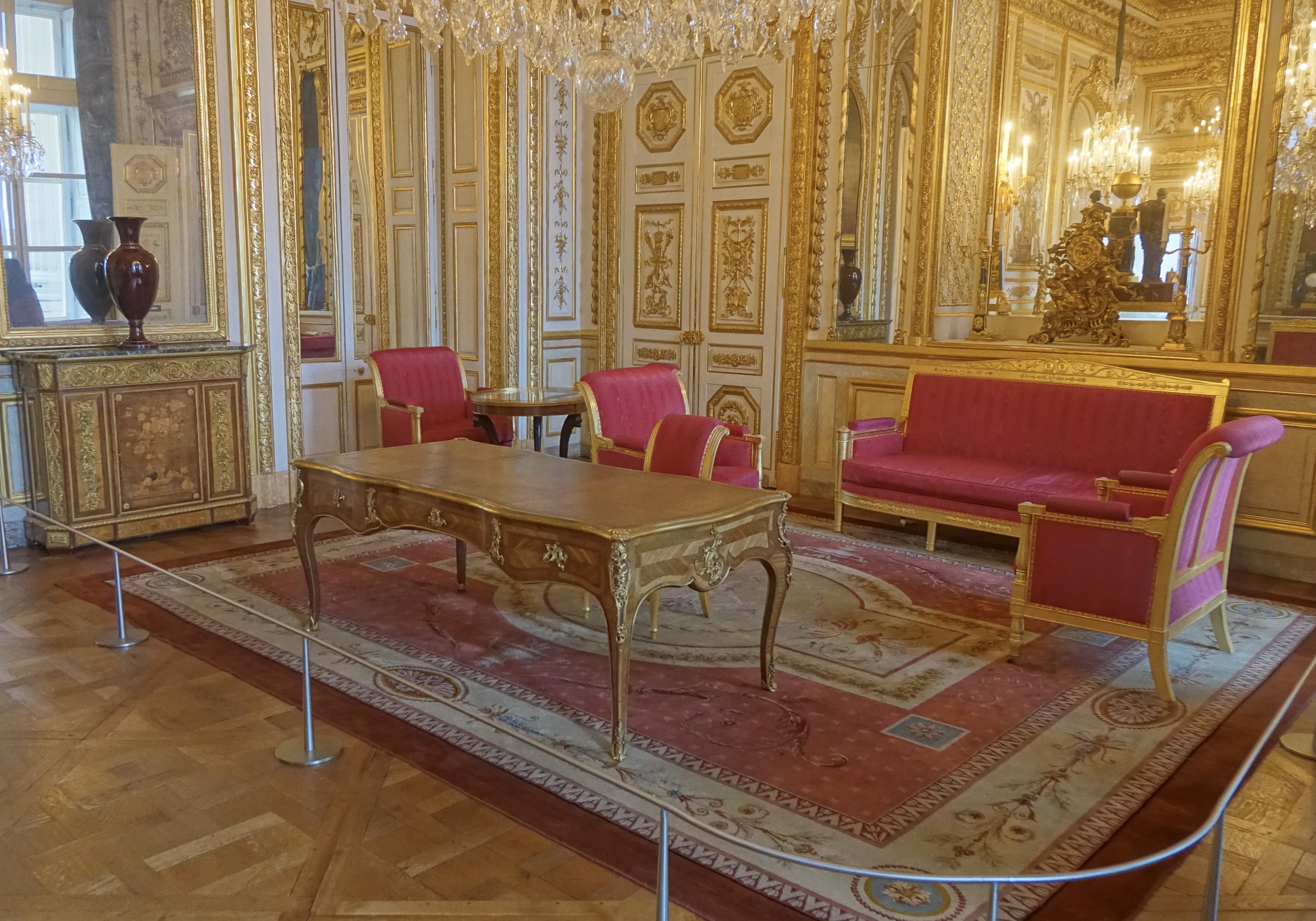
Desk on which the 1848 decree abolishing slavery was signed (Hôtel de la Marine)

At the end of February 1848, during an investigative trip to Senegal, Victor Schœlcher learned of the fall of King Louis-Philippe. He returned to Paris and contacted François Arago, Minister of the Navy and Colonies, who appointed him Under-Secretary of State in charge of the colonies and measures relating to slavery. On 4 March 1848, the provisional government of the Second Republic signed the decree appointing Schœlcher as president of the Commission for the Abolition of Slavery, responsible for preparing emancipation. The commission was established on 5 March, chaired by Schœlcher, and included, among others, Auguste-François Perrinon, a marine artillery battalion chief and future deputy; the Director of the Colonies; Adolphe Gatine, lawyer at the Court of Cassation; and Charles Jean-Baptiste Gaumont, a clockmaker. The commission held its first meeting on 6 March. On 27 April, it proposed a series of twelve decrees that emancipated enslaved people, granting them citizenship status—they were henceforth referred to as “new citizens” or “newly free”—and organized the administration of the colonies. The decrees established national workshops in the colonies, created disciplinary workshops to address begging along with a savings fund, structured personal taxation and taxes on tafias, wine, and spirits, and instituted a Labor Day celebration in the colonies. Additional measures organized mortgages, appointed general commissioners of the Republic to enforce the decrees, extended press freedom to the colonies, regulated military recruitment, maritime registration, and the National Guard, provided care for the elderly, infirm, and orphans, and established cantonal juries.

== Content of the decrees ==
=== Decree of March 4, 1848 ===
Decree of the Provisional Government Creating the Commission for the Abolition of Slavery, March 4, 1848

“The Provisional Government of the Republic, Considering that no French land can any longer hold slaves;

Decrees:

A commission is instituted under the provisional Minister of the Navy and Colonies to prepare, as quickly as possible, the act of immediate emancipation in all the colonies of the Republic.

The Minister of the Navy will ensure the execution of this decree. Paris, March 4, 1848. F. Arago”

=== Decree of April 27, 1848 ===
Decree of the Abolition of Slavery in the French Colonies, April 27, 1848

“Ministry of the Navy and Colonies – Directorate of the Colonies

French Republic

Liberty – Equality – Fraternity

In the Name of the French People

The Provisional Government,

Considering that slavery is an attack on human dignity;

That by destroying man’s free will, it suppresses the natural principle of right and duty; That it is a flagrant violation of the republican motto: ‘Liberty – Equality – Fraternity’;

Considering that if effective measures do not closely follow the already proclaimed principle of abolition, the most deplorable disorders could result in the colonies; …”

Decrees:

Article 1

Slavery shall be entirely abolished in all French colonies and possessions, two months after the promulgation of this decree in each of them. From the date of the decree’s promulgation in the colonies, all corporal punishment and all sales of unfree persons shall be prohibited.

Article 2

The system of fixed-term engagement established in Senegal is abolished.
Article 3

The governors or General Commissioners of the Republic are charged with implementing all measures necessary to ensure freedom in Martinique, Guadeloupe and their dependencies, the island of La Réunion, Guyana, Senegal and other French establishments on the west coast of Africa, the island of Mayotte and its dependencies, and in Algeria.

Article 4

Former slaves convicted of afflictive or correctional penalties for acts that, if committed by free men, would not have incurred such punishment, are amnestied. Individuals deported by administrative order are recalled.

Article 5

The National Assembly shall determine the amount of compensation to be granted to the colonists.

Article 6

The colonies freed from servitude and the possessions in India shall be represented in the National Assembly.

Article 7

The principle “that the soil of France frees the slave who touches it” is applied to the colonies and possessions of the Republic.

Article 8

From now on, even in foreign countries, it is forbidden for any French citizen to own, buy, or sell slaves, or to participate, either directly or indirectly, in any trafficking or exploitation of this kind. Any violation of these provisions shall result in the loss of French citizenship. However, French citizens affected by these prohibitions at the time of the decree’s promulgation shall have a period of three years to comply. Those who acquire slaves in foreign countries by inheritance, gift, or marriage must, under the same penalty, emancipate or dispose of them within the same period from the date of acquisition.

Article 9

The Minister of the Navy and Colonies and the Minister of War are each responsible, in their respective areas, for enforcing this decree.

Done in Paris, in government council, April 27, 1848.

Signed:

Members of the Provisional Government: DUPONT (de l’Eure), LAMARTINE, CRÉMIEUX, GARNIER-PAGÈS, A. MARRAST, Louis BLANC, ALBERT, FLOCON, LEDRU-ROLLIN, ARAGO, MARIE.

Secretary General of the Provisional Government: PAGNERRE

== Implementation of the decrees ==
=== In the French colonies ===
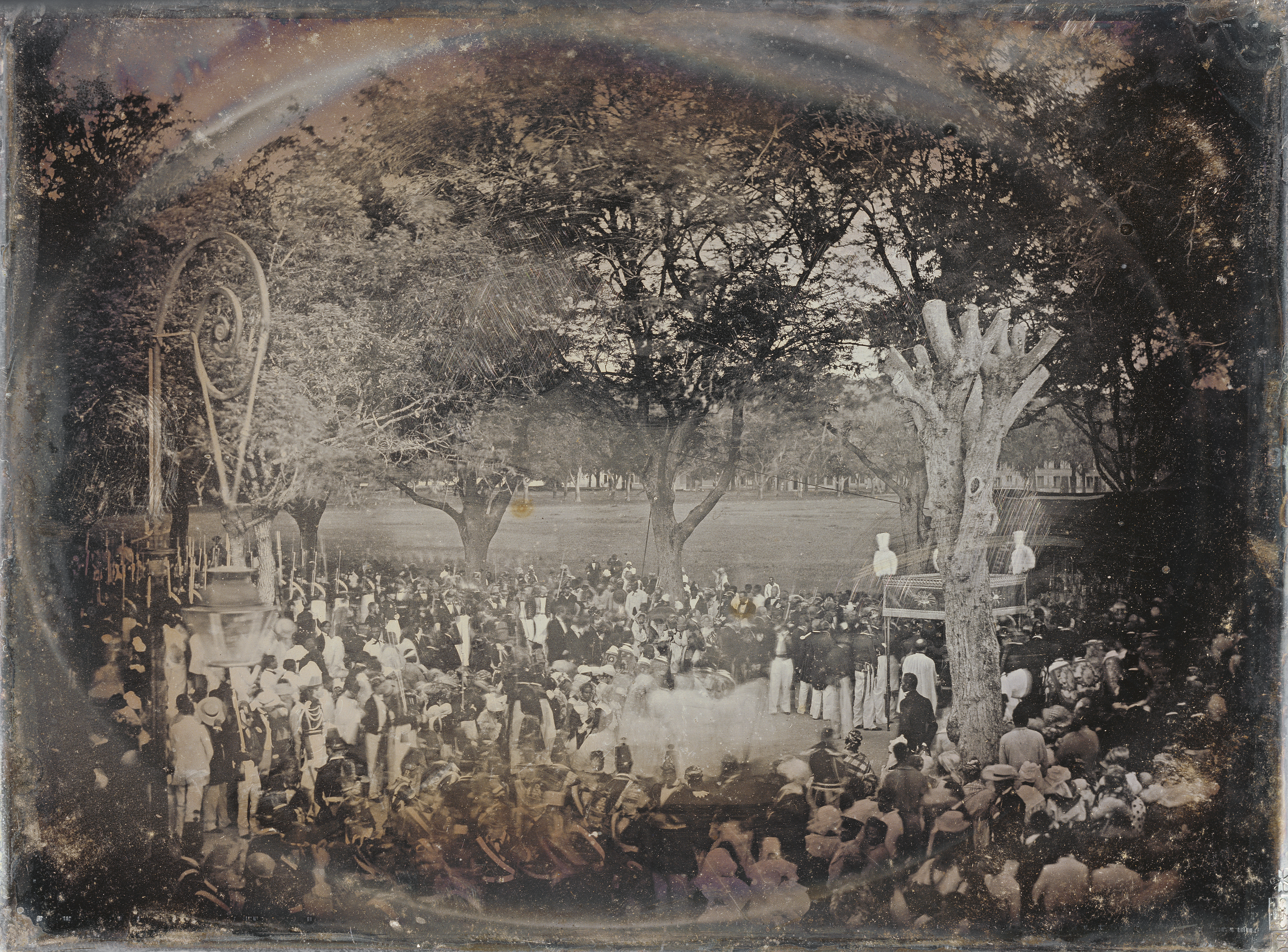
1850 - Daguerreotype depicting the religious ceremony marking the anniversary of the abolition of slavery in 1848 in Martinique.

News that the Republic had abolished slavery, following the provisional government’s decision of 4 March, reached the French colonies a few weeks later and caused significant reaction. By the time the decrees of 24 April arrived, the situation was tense. Although the decrees allowed for a two-month implementation period, events accelerated the process.

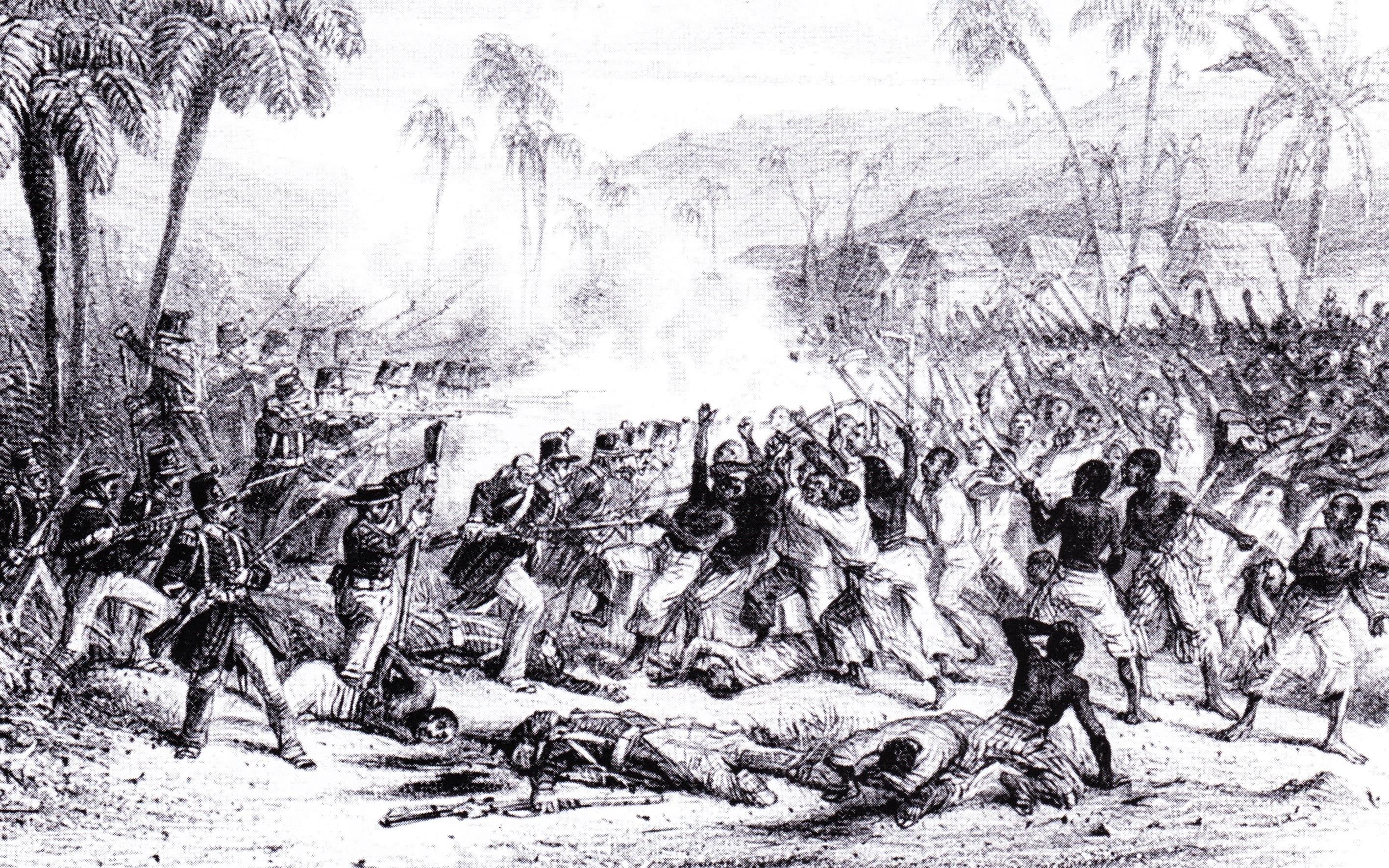
Slave revolt in Martinique on May 22, 1848, leading to the abolition of slavery in the colony of Martinique the following day, ahead of the date planned by the authorities.

On 21 May, in Saint-Pierre, Martinique, a slave named Romain was arrested for playing a drum, a form of communication among enslaved people. The incident triggered an uprising that spread across the island, leading the governor to declare the abolition of slavery on 23 May, prior to the arrival of the envoy carrying the 27 April decree.

On 27 May, once the situation in Guadeloupe had stabilized, Governor Jean-François Layrle proclaimed the general abolition of slavery. By the end of May, the decrees reached La Réunion, but the governor implemented them only on 20 December. In French Guiana, the governor issued the decree on 10 June, with effect from 10 August.

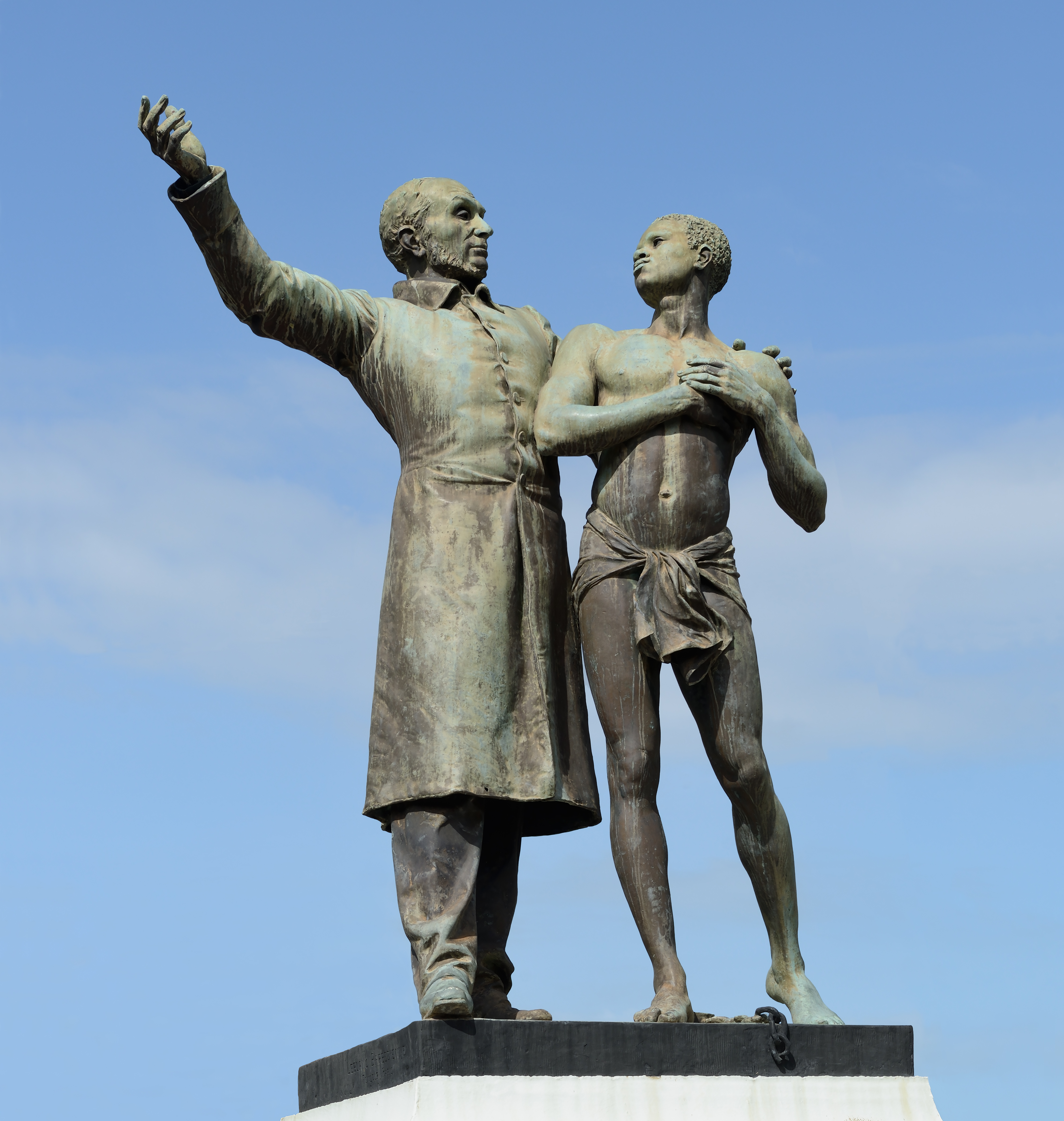
Victor Schœlcher, author of the decree abolishing slavery on April 27, 1848, on a statue honoring him in Cayenne, French Guiana, sculpted by Barrias in 1896. Criticized for its paternalistic view of abolition, the statue was found toppled on July 18, 2020.

The implementation of the abolition decree was more complex in Algeria and Senegal, as some enslaved people were held by indigenous communities. In Algeria, enforcement was limited in rural areas. In Senegal, to avoid conflict with the Moors, who were slaveholders and provided colonial supplies, the governor instructed local authorities to deny refuge to enslaved individuals seeking asylum in French-controlled areas.

A total of 251,019 enslaved people were freed, including 87,087 in Guadeloupe, 74,447 in Martinique, 60,651 in Réunion, 12,251 in French Guiana, 10,350 in Senegal (9,800 freed and 550 on full-time engagement), 2,733 in Mayotte, and 3,500 in Nosy Bé and Sainte-Marie, based on indemnity claims submitted by former owners.

From the first French colonial settlements in the 16th century until the decree of 27 April 1848, approximately four million enslaved people lived under French rule, including about two million born in Africa and two million in the colonies.

Between 1848 and 1870, the enforcement of abolition decrees was inconsistent, and local authorities reestablished structures reminiscent of slavery through regulations such as “labor police,” which included measures like internal passports.

=== Effects on French citizens living in slaveholding countries ===
Article 8 of the 1848 decree prohibited French citizens from owning or trafficking in enslaved people, under penalty of loss of citizenship. Individuals in violation at the time of promulgation, or who later became so through inheritance, gift, or marriage, were given three years to comply. The law extended this prohibition to all French citizens residing in countries where slavery remained legal, affecting approximately 20,000 people, including around 10,000 slave owners, roughly half of whom were concentrated in Louisiana.

The article and the severity of its penalty, which involved loss of citizenship rather than a fine as in the 1843 British legislation, reflected the abolitionist principles of the 1848 republican government. Its aim was to make every French citizen abroad a symbolic protest against slavery and to promote the cause of abolition, encouraging slaveholding societies to follow the example.

Article 8 generated the strongest opposition in Louisiana. By July 1848, the French consul in New Orleans reported that residents might seek American naturalization if the article remained in effect and recommended its repeal. While the leaders of the Second Republic initially rejected compromise, from 1849 onward, some officials became more receptive to these concerns.

Article 8 granted French citizens residing abroad who owned enslaved people a three-year period to divest themselves of this property. As the deadline approached, an amendment supported by the government on 11 February 1851 extended this period to ten years, setting the expiration date at 27 April 1858. Some French slaveholders abroad remained dissatisfied with the prospect of compliance after this period. In Louisiana, the consul reported a local law requiring owners to transport emancipated enslaved people at their own expense to Liberia, which made compliance financially difficult; this position was acknowledged by the relevant French ministers.

The establishment of the Second Empire shifted government priorities, and no measures were taken before the expiration of the extended deadline. In 1858, the law of 28 May, while not repealing Article 8, introduced exceptions for French citizens who owned enslaved people before 1848 or who acquired them through marriage, inheritance, or gift. In practice, these provisions largely limited the effect of Article 8, particularly due to the vague definition of “gift.” As a result, French citizens in Louisiana were able to retain enslaved people until the abolition of slavery in the United States following the Civil War.

== Compensation of slave owners ==
As provided in the decree of 27 April 1848, a law passed on 30 April 1849, during the presidency of Louis-Napoléon Bonaparte and the government of Odilon Barrot, provided compensation to former slave owners. A total of 126 million francs in gold was paid for the emancipation of approximately 250,000 enslaved people.

The monetary compensation for former enslaved people was determined by colony. The highest valuations were in La Réunion at 711 francs per person, followed by French Guiana (624 francs), Guadeloupe (469 francs), Martinique (425 francs), Senegal (225 francs), and Madagascar (69 francs).

This compensation law was symbolically repealed in June 2016 by an amendment stating:

Without claiming any intent to compensate the victims of slavery, this amendment proposes moral reparation for the harm suffered by the slaves by repealing the provisions concerning compensation to colonists contained in the aforementioned texts.

== A global movement ==
During the 19th century, several states that practiced the slave trade and slavery enacted abolition measures. The United States prohibited the slave trade in its 1787 Constitution, with implementation beginning in 1807, while slavery itself continued. The United Kingdom passed legislation on 6 February 1807 to end the trade by 1 January 1809, and abolished slavery on 15 August 1833, effective 1 August 1834. In 1835, the liberal Spanish government abolished the slave trade in its colonies, followed by Portugal in 1836, although enforcement was limited and the decree was not published in some regions, including Mozambique. On 3 December 1837, Pope Gregory XVI condemned the slave trade and slavery in his papal brief In suprema apostolatus fastigio.

On 28 July 1847, Denmark, which had prohibited the slave trade in 1802, abolished slavery in its Caribbean colonies, initially with a twelve-year transitional period, but granted immediate freedom on 3 July 1848. In 1850, Brazil took measures to suppress the slave trade. From 1854, Portugal gradually emancipated enslaved people in its possessions, including those in municipalities and charitable institutions in 1856, and later those owned by churches. On 5 July 1856, enslaved people in Angola were freed, followed by those in the Portuguese Indies on 25 August 1856. The Netherlands abolished slavery in Malaysia on 1 January 1860, and in its Caribbean colonies and Suriname in 1863. In the United States, President Abraham Lincoln signed a decree on 1 January 1863 freeing enslaved people in the Southern states during the Civil War (1861–1865); the law was passed by the House of Representatives on 8 April 1864, by the Senate on 31 January 1865, and ratified by three-quarters of the states on 18 December 1865. Brazil was the last country in the Americas to abolish slavery, doing so in 1888 through the Lei Áurea (Golden Law) without compensation to owners. Mauritania was the last country worldwide to formally abolish slavery, in 1981.

== Commemoration ==
The law recognizing the slave trade and slavery as crimes against humanity established a day of commemoration for the abolition. The date was set four years later, on 10 May, corresponding to the day the law was adopted.

== See also ==
- Slavery
- Cyrille Bissette
- Law of 4 February 1794

== Bibliography ==
- Blanc, Louis (1840). De l'abolition de l'esclavage aux colonies, dans Revue du progrès politique, social et littéraire [From the abolition of slavery in the colonies, in Review of Political, Social, and Literary Progress] (in French). Vol. I. pp. 3–17.
- Jollivet, Thomas (1847). Des pétitions demandant l'émancipation immédiate des noirs dans les colonies françaises [Petitions calling for the immediate emancipation of Black people in the French colonies] (in French). Paris: Imprimerie de Guiraudet et Jouaust.
- Société orientale de France; Lavollée, Charles Hubert (1848). Abolition de l'esclavage dans les colonies françaises. Des mesures à prendre pour l'émancipation [Abolition of slavery in the French colonies. Measures to be taken for emancipation] (in French). Vol. 3. Paris: Just Rouvier. pp. 293–330.
- Schoelcher, Victor (2018). Esclavage et colonisation [Slavery and colonization] (in French). Paris: PUF. ISBN 978-2-13-079904-7.
- Schoelcher, Victor (1998). Des colonies françaises: abolition immédiate de l'esclavage [French colonies: immediate abolition of slavery] (in French). Paris: CTHS. ISBN 2-7355-0382-8.
- Alexandre-Debray, Janine (2006). Victor Schœlcher. L'homme qui a fait abolir l'esclavage [Victor Schœlcher. The man who abolished slavery] (in French). Paris: Perrin.
- Dorigny, Marcel (2018). Les abolitions de l'esclavage (1793-1888) [The abolition of slavery (1793-1888)] (in French). Presses Universitaires de France.
- Jennings, Lawrence (1969). "L'abolition de l'esclavage par la IIe République et ses effets en Louisiane (1848-1858)" [The Abolition of Slavery by the Second Republic and Its Effects in Louisiana (1848–1858)]. Revue française d'histoire d'outre-mer (in French). 56 (205): 375–397. doi:10.3406/outre.1969.1493.
- Schmidt, Nelly (1998). "1848 dans les colonies françaises des Caraïbes. Ambitions républicaines et ordre colonial" [1848 in the French colonies of the Caribbean. Republican ambitions and colonial order]. Outre-Mers. Revue d'histoire (in French). 85 (320): 33–69. doi:10.3406/outre.1998.3656.
- Jennings, Laurence (2000). French anti-slavery. The movement for the abolition of slavery in France, 1802-1848. Cambridge University Press.
- Schmidt, Nelly (2000). Abolitionnistes de l'esclavage et réformateurs des colonies. Analyse et documents [Abolitionists of slavery and reformers of the colonies. Analysis and documents] (in French). Paris: Karthala.
- Schmidt, Nelly (2005). L'abolition de l'esclavage. Cinq siècles de combats (XVIe siècle-XXe siècle) [The abolition of slavery. Five centuries of struggle (16th century–20th century)] (in French). Paris: Fayard.
- Vergès, Françoise (2001). Abolir l'esclavage. Une utopie coloniale. Les ambiguïtés d'une politique humanitaire [Abolishing slavery. A colonial utopia. The ambiguities of humanitarian policy.] (in French). Paris: Albin Michel.
- Jennings, Lawrence (2010). La France et l'abolition de l'esclavage 1802-1848 [France and the Abolition of Slavery 1802-1848] (in French). André Versaille.
- Étienne, Rodolf (2018). Lalibèté ka vini ! – Décrets d'abolition de l'esclavage du 27 avril 1848 / Dékré labolisyon lesklavaj 27 avril 1848 [Lalibèté ka vini! – Decrees abolishing slavery on April 27, 1848 / Dékré labolisyon lesklavaj April 27, 1848] (in French). éditions SCITEP.
- Sainton, Jean-Pierre (2003). "De l'état d'esclave à « l'état de citoyen »: modalités du passage de l'esclavage à la citoyenneté aux Antilles françaises sous la Seconde République (1848-1850)" [From slave to citizen: how slavery turned into citizenship in the French West Indies during the Second Republic (1848-1850)]. Outre-Mers. Revue d'histoire (in French). 90 (« L'État et les pratiques administratives en situation coloniale »): 47–82. doi:10.3406/outre.2003.4014.
