= Victor Mazuline =

Martiniquais politician (1789–1854)

Victor Petit-Frère Mazuline
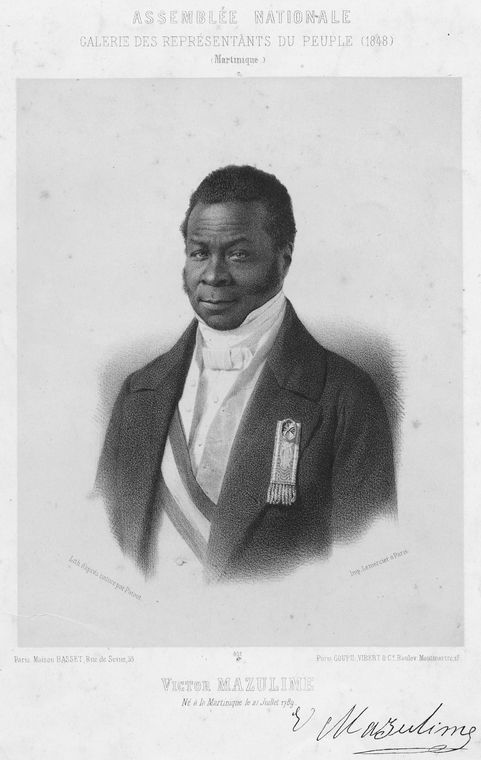

Representative to the National Constituent Assembly for Martinique
- In office 9 August 1848 – 26 May 1849

Personal details
- Born: 21 July 1789 Fort de France, Martinique
- Died: 28 January 1854 (aged 64) Paris

Victor Petit-Frère Mazuline (21 July 1789 in Fort-Royal, Martinique – 28 January 1854 in Paris) was a French politician from Martinique. He was elected as a people's representative in the first legislative elections held after the abolition of slavery in the colonies, the first black deputy from Martinique.

== Life ==
Victor Mazuline was born in Fort-Royal (Martinique) on 21 July 1789; his father and mother were both enslaved. He left Martinique in 1802 with his master, Marshal Mottet, chief of the gendarmerie, who took him to the United States aged thirteen, then to France, where Mottet freed him. Mottet died in poverty at the Val-de-Grâce hospital.

Mazuline was later hired as coachman of Pierre Paul Nicolas Henrion de Pansey. When de Pansey's daughter married Joseph Marie de Pernety, a general of the Revolutionary and Napoleonic Wars, Mazuline followed to the new household. He married Anne Claude Chapuis, maid to de Pansey's daughter, who was originally from Haute-Saône. Mazuline and his wife had two daughters, one who died quite young, and another named Madèleine Uranie Victorine. Uranie Mazuline studied well, passing her aptitude exams at the Hôtel de Ville. She founded a girl's boarding school in Martinique.

== Political career ==
Mazuline eventually left the service of de Pernety, becoming a rentier in Paris. He was an active campaigner, acting as the general treasurer of "Les Enfants de l'Afrique" an abolitionist association, and took part in the editorial committee of Cyrille Bissette's publication, Revue des colonies. The French revolution of 1848 removed the ruling monarchy, and during the turmoil affecting the whole French empire, slavery had been abolished in Martinique on 23 May by governor Rostolan. The provisional government of the new regime decreed universal suffrage, banned the death penalty, freedom of assembly, freedom of the press and the abolition of slavery, which came into effect on Martinique on 9 August, the day elections were to take place. Legislative elections were held throughout 1848 in each of the French colonies. He was elected as the representative of Martinique to the Constituent Assembly, by 18,504 votes out of 20,698 voters, as a substitute for Bissette, whose election was annulled because of a former conviction. Mazuline was therefore elected, being next on the list.

Mazuline's first appearance in the Palais Bourbon, walking the length of the meeting hall of the Deputies to reach his seat as a people's representative, was reported internationally. Victor Mazuline fought to defend the abolition of slavery in the Constitution adopted on 4 November, providing a stability to new freedoms.

He paid tribute to the newly constituted state in the following terms:

«Honneur et reconnaissance à la République française qui a rendu la liberté aux noirs. Je fus nommé en août 1848 le premier de la race noire représentant du peuple par 18 492 nouveaux citoyens à l'Assemblée constituante. Je dois cette reconnaissance à la République seule. Aussi je dis : vivons et mourons pour elle »

Translation:

Honour and gratitude to the French Republic which has given freedom to the blacks. In August 1848 I was appointed the first representative of the black race by 18,492 new citizens to the Constituent Assembly. I owe this recognition to the Republic alone. So I say: let us live and die for it.

He voted against the sanction of the Constitution by the people, for the Constitution as a whole and against the proposal of Jean-Pierre Rateau. He obtained a leave of absence and took no part in the subsequent votes. He did not stand in the 1849 elections to set up the National Assembly. After retiring from political life, he died at his townhouse in the 6th arrondissement of Paris, on 28 January 1854.
