= Pierre-Marie Pory-Papy =

French lawyer & politician (1805–1874)

Pierre Marie Pory-Papy
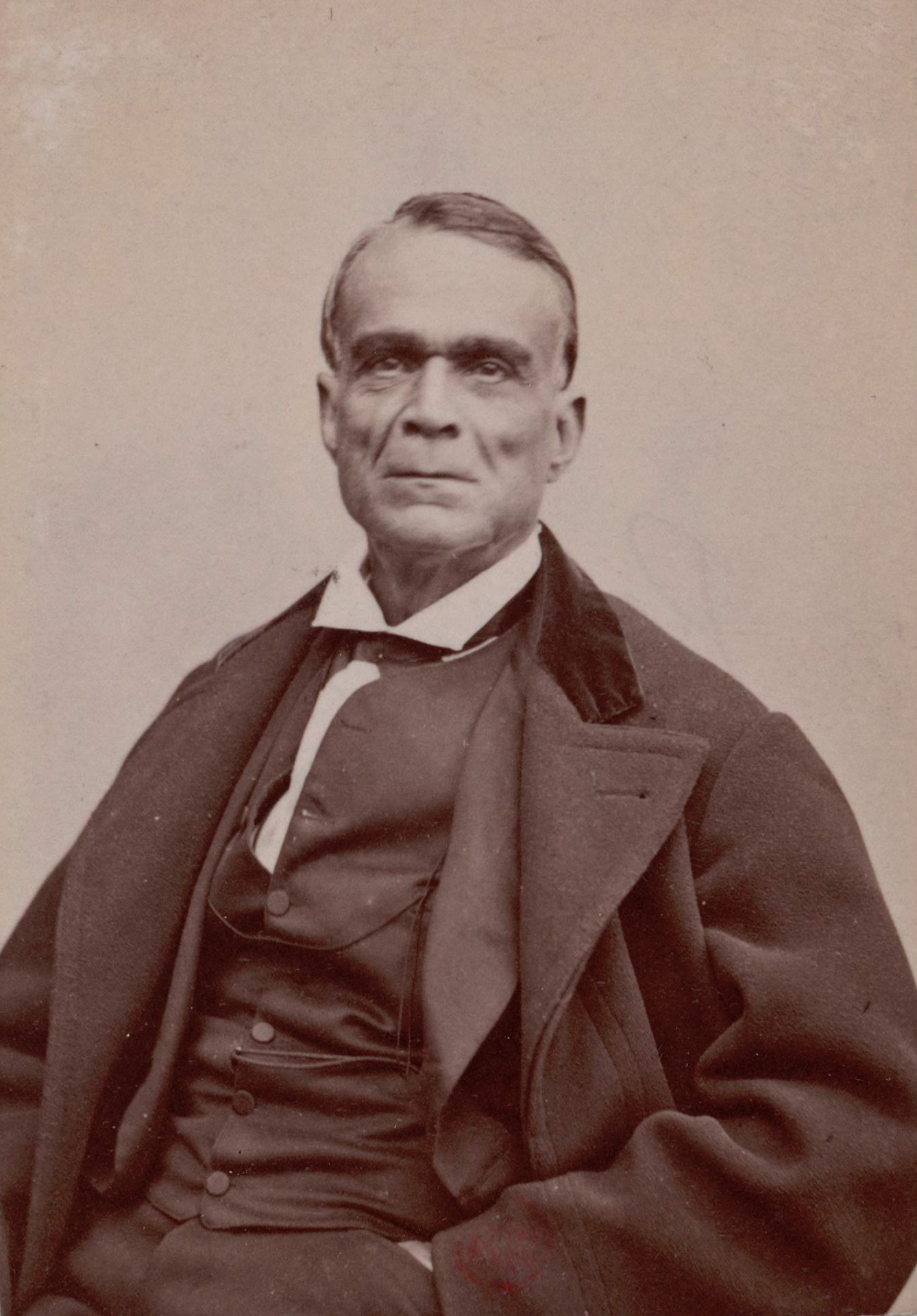

Deputy of the National Assembly
- In office 9 August 1848 – 26 May 1849
- Constituency: Martinique
- In office 8 February 1871 – 27 January 1874
- Constituency: Martinique

Mayor of Saint-Pierre, Martinique
- In office 24 May 1848 – 30 August 1848

Personal details
- Born: 3 May 1805 Saint-Pierre, Martinique
- Died: 27 January 1874 Versailles (Seine-et-Oise)
- Resting place: Montreuil, Seine-Saint-Denis
- Party: Republican Union (Third Republic)

Pierre-Marie Pory-Papy, born on 3 May 1805 in Saint-Pierre, Martinique and died on 27 January 1874 in Versailles, Seine-et-Oise, was a French lawyer and politician. He was deputy of Martinique from 1848 to 1849 and from 1871 to 1874.

== Biography ==
Pierre-Marie Pory-Papy was the son of a free man of colour from Martinique and Antoinette, a freedwoman. He was born before his mother received her freedom, but his name is not found in the register of births until 30 March 1806, because his parents waited until she was free to register his birth.

In 1832, he left for France and was shipwrecked on the Spanish coast. Despite this, he arrived there and settled in Aix-en-Provence, where he obtained his first baccalaureate in August 1833, his second in August 1834. He continued his studies at the Faculty of Law in Paris. He obtained a law degree in July 1835, returned to Martinique and was called to the bar in St-Pierre, the first man of colour to become a lawyer in Martinique.

He also wrote poetry which he contributed to the Revue des Colonies.

== Elected offices ==
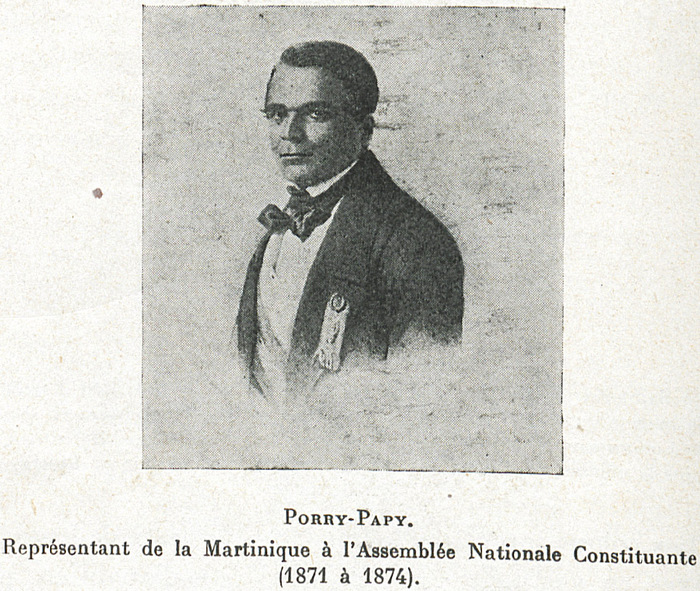
Portrait of Pierre-Marie Pory-Papy as deputy of the National Assembly for Martinique.

Pierre-Marie Pory-Papy was successively elected municipal councillor, deputy mayor, mayor of Saint-Pierre and deputy of Martinique. Though both abolitionists, Pory-Papy was politically distinct from Cyrille Bissette, and aligned instead with Victor Schoelcher.

Pierre-Marie Pory-Papy was corresponding member of the Abolitionist Society, looking for a position as a solicitor when the French Revolution of 1848 occurred. On 30 March 1848, governor Rostoland issued a decree dissolving the municipal council of St-Pierre. On the same day he appointed Hervé as provisional mayor and Pory-Papy as provisional deputy, in charge of the police, alongside two others. The decree of 10 May 1848 confirmed them in their posts, following elections which took place on 2 and 3 May 1848. He was also appointed councillor at the Court of Appeal of Martinique by decree of the provisional government of the French Republic, dated 3 May 1848.

Pierre-Marie Pory-Papy is an important figure in the history of Martinique for his role in support of the enslaved population during the anti-slavery insurrection of May 1848 in Saint-Pierre.

22 May 1848: Romain, an enslaved man from the Duchamp house, was incarcerated following the complaint of the mayor of Saint-Pierre for having played the drum while others were preparing manioc. The enslaved people of his workshop, finding the punishment excessive, defended him and, with the help of Pierrotins, demanded his release in front of the prison. A force was sent to disperse the crowd. Pierre-Marie Pory-Papy, the mixed race deputy mayor of Saint-Pierre in charge of the police, had the prisoner released. The mayor of Saint-Pierre, Pierre Hervé, who was in favour of slavery, summoned him before the municipal council to ask for an explanation and to express his disapproval. This summons of Pory-Papy provoked a gathering of enslaved people around the town hall, who wanted to protect Pory-Papy. The town council, worried by the events, voted in favour of Pory-Papy and the abolition of slavery. For one day and one night, enslaved people completely invaded the town of Saint-Pierre. The revolt spread to the south of the island and the Atlantic coast. On 23 May 1848, faced with a general uprising of the enslaved, Governor Claude Rostoland decreed the abolition of slavery in Martinique.

— Lépine, Edouard de (1999). Dix semaines qui ébranlèrent la Martinique : 25 mars-4 juin 1848. Paris: Servédit.

On 24 May 1848, the day after the application of the 1848 decree on the abolition of slavery, Pierre-Marie Pory-Papy was elected by the municipal council as mayor of Saint-Pierre, a position he would hold until 30 August 1848. He was twice elected deputy of Martinique, for the first time on 9 August 1848, losing his seat on 26 May 1849. During this term, he "earned the special enmity of the proprietors on Martinique by agitating for the break-up of the large estates and a distribution of land to landless."

He was successfully reelected on 8 February 1871 and served until 27 January 1874, when he died. He was buried in Versailles, in the Montreuil cemetery.

== In literature ==
- Pory-Papy appears as part of the events of 22 May described to the narrator of the novel Texaco, by Patrick Chamoiseau
- He also appears in Marie-Reine de Jaham's Le sang du volcan.

== See also ==
Monique Palcy's article: Pierre Marie Pory-Papy in Notre Bulletin (Association Martiniquaise de Recherche de l'Histoire des Familles) No. 27, July 2013.
