= Le Mulâtre =

1837 short story by Victor Séjour

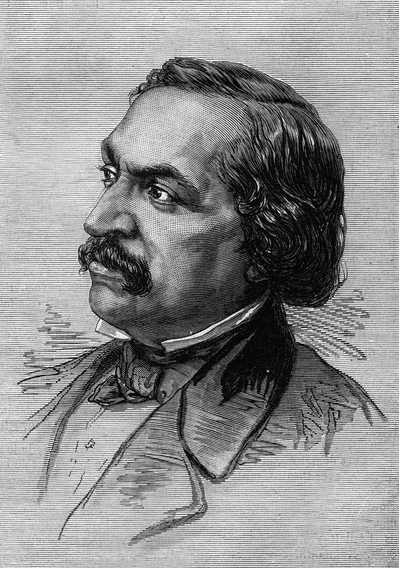
Victor Séjour, author of "The Mulatto"

"Le Mulâtre" ("The Mulatto") is a short story by Victor Séjour, a free person of color and Creole of color born and raised in New Orleans, Louisiana. It was written in French, Séjour's first language, and published in the Paris abolitionist journal Revue des Colonies in 1837. It is the earliest extant work of fiction by an African-American author. It was noted as such when it was first translated in English, appearing in the first edition of the Norton Anthology of African American Literature in 1997.

Before the importance of French literature by writers of color from New Orleans was recognized, histories of African-American fiction had conventionally begun with "The Heroic Slave" by Frederick Douglass in 1852, and "The Two Offers" by Frances Ellen Watkins Harper in 1859 had been considered the first African-American short story. French-language literature flourished from the late 18th and into the early 20th century in Louisiana, and the francophone literary community among people of color was intellectually rich and sophisticated. This reality was obscured by the identification of American literature with writing in English. The literary dynamism of New Orleans prepared Séjour to have a successful career as a dramatist in Paris. He emigrated there at the age of 19 for his education and to escape racial restrictions in the U.S.

"The Mulatto" has been described as "a gothic revenge tale revolving around the psychological conflicts of a mulatto searching for the identity of his father." It is one of the earliest works of fiction driven by the psychological trauma of American slavery.

== Publication ==
The Revue des Colonies was an abolitionist journal edited in Paris by Cyril Bissette from 1834 to 1842. Its contributors were mainly free persons of color, from French Caribbean colonies and the United States. Bissette published "Le Mulâtre" in the March 1837 issue, not long after the 19-year-old Séjour arrived from his native New Orleans to further his education and career.

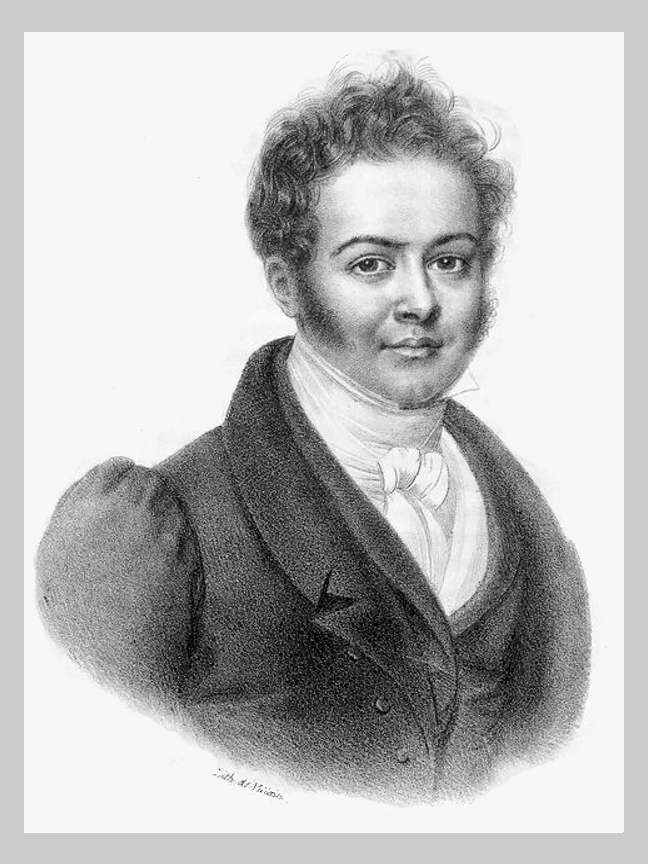
Cyril Bissette, publisher of the Revue des Colonies

A Louisiana state law passed in 1830 restricted the dissemination of "seditious" writing. Séjour's story detailing the injustice and cruelty of slavery was not published there, although it may have circulated privately through family connections.

An English translation of "Le Mulâtre" was not published until 1997, when Philip Barnard's edition was included in the Norton Anthology of African American Literature. Another translation, by Andrea Lee, was published in the Multilingual Anthology of American Literature in 2000.

== Structure and setting ==
The main story takes place in Saint Domingue before the Haitian Revolution, and is told in third person. The narrative frame, however, is post-revolutionary: the first-person narrator, a visitor to the place, identifies Saint Domingue as "now the Republic of Haiti". This visitor, addressed as "Master," is presumably white. The "I" of the introduction hears the story told by an "old negro," Antoine, who is a contemporary of the mulatto protagonist of the events related. The author gives Antoine license to tell the story from a nearly omniscient point of view, but the story ends without returning to its initial narrative setting.

The story is set specifically in Saint Marc, the city from which Séjour's father, a free man of color, had emigrated to New Orleans. Some of the writer's relatives still lived in Haiti, including a nephew, Frédéric Marcelin, who was a political activist and writer of the Romantic movement. The elder Séjour was a free mulatto whose parents were a white man and a free woman of color. Victor's mother was also a free woman of color. Séjour's baptismal record identifies him as a "free quadroon". "The Mulatto" is the only extant work by Séjour to be set in the "New World".

The setting established by the narrative frame—both the time of day and the site—enhances the story's themes. It begins as dawn is turning the black mountains white ("Les premiers rayons de l'aurore blanchissaient à peine la cime noire des montagnes"). Werner Sollors offers the interpretation that dawn and dusk are points in the 24-hour cycle that are neither night nor day, but both. The Classical goddess of the dawn, Eos to the Greeks, Roman Aurora, had myths associating her with Aethiopia, and was the mother of a black son, Memnon. Characters named Aurora, Aurore or Dawn in fiction on biracial themes—including The Quadroon by Mayne Reid, The Grandissimes by George Washington Cable, The Foxes of Harrow by Frank Yerby, and "The Black Madonna" by Muriel Spark—are symbolically situated between night (black) and day (white).

The first-person narrator as a visitor describes the verdant landscape as picturesque and exotic, expressive of "the sublime diversity of God's works." But Antoine, as he begins to take over the narrative, points to the dominant man-made structure, "an edifice that ... in its peculiarity resembles a temple and in its pretense a palace". Here the rentiers and idlers would gather to play billiards and smoke Cuban cigars along with planters who were in town to buy slaves. As in gothic literature by white writers, a grand human façade contrasts with the beautiful otherness of nature and masks a horror within. The description of this "edifice" as a temple, surrounded by fields "like young virgins at the foot of an altar," marks the violation of the black female body as a form of sacrifice.

== Genre and themes ==
"The Mulatto" is a melodrama with the gothic elements of curses, suicide, murder, and the monstrous. It is an example of how European artistic forms were adapted for transatlantic slave-owning culture. Melodrama in a domestic setting was particularly transferable to interracial questions of family legitimacy:

Dramas of patriarchal right, and hyperbolic investments in moral polarities of good and evil, virtue and villainy, are about investing the family with new symbolic potency ... In the context of Saint-Domingue and Louisiana, and in 'Le Mulâtre,' the symbolic crisis of the Law of the Father and of social legitimacy is lived literally and viscerally. The colonial family romance here really means killing the father, as the conflict between slave and slave master is, so often, a family drama too.

Séjour's treatment of the "tragic mulatto" trope is unusual in that the protagonist is male rather than a beautiful woman. While it was common for stories employing this trope to end in the death of the mulatto, Séjour complicates his audience's response to the protagonist by having him commit patricide as well as suicide. The themes of slavery and "miscegenation" are thus imbued with oedipal conflict.

Sollors views "The Mulatto" and American slavery literature in general as having an inherent kinship with Greek tragedy in focusing on the violent disruption of family. In particular, he writes, "the biracial heir ... may be denied his birthright and inheritance by his father and hence have to engage in a quest for recognition." The character doomed by biracialism is a theme that recurs in later African-American literature, including the short story "Father and Son" by Langston Hughes and the play he developed from it, The Mulatto.

Séjour's strong use of dialogue points toward his future career as a noted playwright. Weiss suggests that Sejour's play The Jew of Seville, set in 15th-century Spain, allows him to deal with racism and the concept of blood purity while evading the potential censorship that a more direct and contemporary treatment of slavery was likely to provoke. "Purity of blood" statutes (limpieza de sangre) had imposed a lesser political and social status on conversos, those who had converted to Christianity from Judaism or Islam, or who had descended from converts, making ancestry a liability the individual could not overcome.

In the New World, Spain applied the concept to the ethnicity of descendants of Spanish colonists, indigenous people and mixtos, and people of mixed African descent, creating an elaborate caste system related to blood purity. Séjour may have seen parallels to the "one drop rule" or binary racial caste that predominated among some elements of American society.

The Jew of Seville was Séjour's first play, accepted in 1843 for production at the Comédie Française. Around the same time, two other plays on Paris stages featured a mulatto character. Like the protagonist in Séjour's earlier short story, the character in The Jew of Seville who is of mixed ancestry also commits suicide, and the family is destroyed. Although the grand, classically constructed drama may seem removed from the abolitionist passion of "The Mulatto," historical distance allows Séjour to show that categorizations by "blood" are socially constructed and subject to change. The historical perspective also highlights that 1492—the year in which Jews were expelled from Toledo, and one of the acts in the anti-Semitic background of Séjour's play—was the year in which the New World was "discovered" by the expedition sponsored by Spain. Séjour can be seen as linking traditions of racism in the Old and New worlds in order to criticize them.

At the time of his death in 1874, Séjour was known to have written a play called L'Esclave ("The Slave"), but the manuscript has never been found. In 1861, a journal reported that Séjour was planning a play about the American abolitionist John Brown, who led an attack on a US armory, but this work too remains unknown.

== Plot ==
The story Antoine tells compresses several years of horrific events into about 5,500 words. The instigating action is the sale at auction of a beautiful Senegalese woman, Laïsa. In a display of his superior wealth, a 22-year-old planter named Alfred outbids other potential buyers who covet her beauty. Alfred compels Laïsa to share his bed. When he fails to deprive her of her pride and self-containment, he grows bored and sends her to live in one of the poorest cabins on the plantation. There she gives birth to his mixed-race child, whom he never acknowledges.

The boy, Georges, grows up on the plantation without ever learning who his father is. Laïsa refuses to reveal his identity, fearing that Alfred would kill the child to protect his own public image. She gives Georges a pouch that she says contains a portrait of his father. Georges promises his dying mother that he won't look inside until he turns 25. Georges' high moral character is indicated by his keeping his promise.

A band of brigands has been terrorizing planters in the area, and Georges learns that his master will be the next target. He tries to warn Alfred, who suspects Georges of being part of the plot. Georges defends Alfred against four assailants, and is seriously wounded. Alfred finally recognizes Georges' loyalty, and has him carried home to his cabin to be cared for. But while demonstrating his gratitude with frequent visits, Alfred begins to desire Georges' young and beautiful wife, Zélie, also a mulatto. Zélie is virtuous and dignified, and rejects Alfred. He lures her into a situation where he can attempt to rape her, but she pushes him away so forcefully that he falls and sustains a head injury. Zélie knows at once that by the Code noir she will have to die: "Any slave who strikes his master, his mistress, the husband of his mistress, or their children, causing bruises or effusion of blood shall be punished by death." Although Georges begs Alfred to pardon her, Zélie is executed by hanging. Georges escapes to the depths of the forest, where he joins slave rebels or Maroons and bides his time.

Three years later, Georges knows that Alfred has married and had a child with his wife. He chooses this moment of happiness for his revenge. He enters the mansion by stealth, gives the wife poison, and forces Alfred to watch her die, taunting him. He picks up an ax to behead Alfred. Only then does Alfred try to save himself by identifying as Georges's father—but too late. As Alfred says "father", Georges' blow beheads him. Georges at last opens the portrait pouch. When he learns the oedipal truth, he kills himself.

Although the story is presented as a melodrama—the villainous slave-dealer twirls his mustache—it conveys the injustices of the Code noir and realities of how slavery disrupted family life. European legal and ethical traditions allowed Africans to be deprived of legal personhood and the right to control their own bodies or family relationships. Within this system, the Maroons who reclaimed their freedom became outlaws.

== Characters ==
=== Georges ===
Georges is presented as a potential hero, though the seeds of destruction are present from the beginning:

Georges had all the talents necessary for becoming a well-regarded gentleman; yet he was possessed of a haughty, tenacious, willful nature; he had one of those oriental sorts of dispositions, the kind that, once pushed far enough from the path of virtue, will stride boldly down the path of crime. He would have given ten years of his life to know the name of his father, but he dared not violate the solemn oath he had made to his dying mother. It was as if nature pushed him toward Alfred; he liked him, as much as one can like a man; and Alfred esteemed him, but with that esteem that the horseman bears for the most handsome and vigorous of his chargers.

Georges is instinctively drawn toward his natural father, who can only regard Georges as if he were a prized animal. Georges is Alfred's property rather than his heir. By law his white half-sibling, still an infant, may inherit ownership of Alfred. The mulatto, as he is called repeatedly throughout the story in place of his given name, is denied the oedipal knowledge of his identity that would prevent a tragic end.

Helpless to save his wife, Georges suffers the "tragedy of masculinity" that Antoine predicts as the fate of the enslaved "negro" male. Georges is subject to the patriarchal power denied to him although he is a male head of family; he is also denied the right to keep his family together and protect his wife and children. As Antoine harshly declaims at the beginning of the story, a slave's virtues as a man can never come to fruition: the institution corrupts virtue until it becomes monstrous, grotesque or destructive. Georges' heroic impulses are overwritten by gothic horror. He threatens to kill Alfred and drink his blood; his laugh becomes "infernal," his voice issues as if from a tomb, like "one of the damned."

Séjour's Georges may have been influenced by the "explosive rebel" named Georges in the play Marie, or, Slavery in the United States by Gustave de Beaumont, which had premiered two years earlier. Georges was the name given a mixed-race title character of an 1843 novel by Alexandre Dumas, who was a friend and patron of Séjour; he had another character named Laïza. In English-language literature by African Americans, the figure of the mulatto has usually been a victimized female, especially in works published after the Civil War and emancipation. Denied legitimate expressions of manhood, Georges exacts a horrific revenge that in the end consumes him.

=== Laïsa and Zélie ===
African Americans writing in French were far more explicit about sexuality than those writing in English at the time. In particular, the sexual exploitation of women of color by white men was often implied and indirect in 19th-century American fiction in English. Séjour describes the commodification of Laïsa's body in blunt terms, and is explicit about sexual assault and forced concubinage.

Laïsa and Zélie are presented as mirroring characters whose fate is determined by the sexual demands of the white master. Though "pure as the morning dew" before she is sold at auction, Laïsa is forced into concubinage that leaves her a "fallen woman". She is discarded, but allowed to live, as is her child, because she keeps silent about the master and father. By contrast, Zélie fights off the master's assault, preserving her virtue, at the cost of her death. By informing her husband of the assault, she also is a catalyst of his actions for revenge.

== Political influence ==
After the execution of his wife, Georges escapes with his young son and joins the Maroons, described by Séjour as "slaves who have fled the tyranny of their master". Georges already knows their watchword: Afrique et liberté, "Africa and freedom." Their use of the French Revolutionary rallying cry liberté, later codified into the motto liberté, egalité, fraternité, is a dramatic irony: white revolutionaries in France and America who fought for freedom in the 1770s and 1790s held enslaved Africans and African Americans, and most opposed the black-led Haitian Revolution in the late eighteenth century. Séjour's contemporary readers may have viewed the familial bloodshed at the end of "The Mulatto" as prefiguring the Haitian Revolution, with the author casting Haiti as "the cradle of black freedom".

As an expatriate writer, Séjour associated with radicals in the salons of Paris, never returning to his native city. Although his career in France was rather unstable, he befriended a number of French authors of great influence to Creoles of color in New Orleans throughout the 19th century—Cyril Bissette, Alphonse de Lamartine, Victor Hugo, and Alexandre Dumas among them.
