= Victor Séjour =

American-born French novelist and playwright (1817–1874)

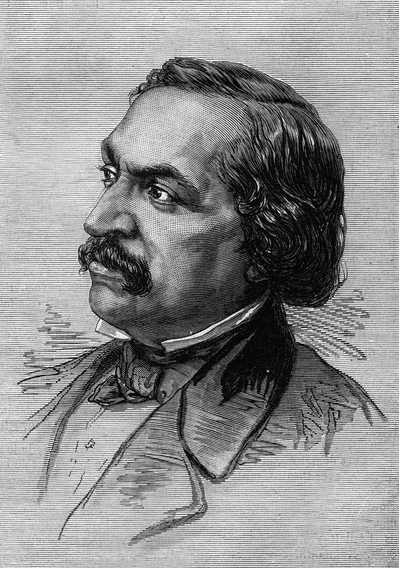
- Born: June 2, 1817; New Orleans, Louisiana
- Died: September 20, 1874 (aged 57); Paris, France
- Resting place: Père Lachaise Cemetery
- Occupations: Novelist, playwright
- Writing career
- Period: Victoria era
- Genre: Fiction

Juan Victor Séjour Marcou et Ferrand (June 2, 1817 – September 20, 1874) was an American writer. Born in New Orleans, he spent most of his career in Paris. Séjour's fiction and plays were written and published in French. Although he was mostly unknown to later American writers of the nineteenth century, his short story "Le Mulâtre" ("The Mulatto") is the earliest known work of fiction by a Black American author. In France, however, he was known chiefly for his plays. His first work of fiction was an ode to French Emperor Napoleon in 1841.

== Biography ==
Juan Victor Séjour was born on June 2, 1817, in New Orleans to François Marcou, a Creole of color from Saint-Domingue (today's Haiti), and Eloisa Philippe Ferrand, a New Orleans-born quadroon. His parents were wealthy and had him educated in a private school. There were no public schools for people of color in New Orleans, and the society as a whole was segregated. Free people of color, however, especially if they had some economic status, had more legal rights than did enslaved African Americans in Louisiana.

At the age of nineteen, Séjour moved to Paris to continue his education and find work. Other free people of color from the US, whose families were wealthy enough, also studied in Paris. There he met members of the Parisian literary elite, including Cyrille Bissette, publisher of the black-owned journal La Revue des Colonies.

Bisette published "Le Mulâtre" (in French), Séjour's short story and first work, in 1837. The account of a loyal slave exacting revenge on his cruel white master (who was also his father) for the death of the slave's wife, "Le Mulâtre" is an indictment of New World slavery that is found in none of Séjour's subsequent work.

Séjour turned away from writing fiction, composing an ode to Napoleon in 1841. He published the verse drama The Jew of Seville, which was premiered in 1844. The latter established his reputation as a playwright. He wrote Richard III, a Shakespeare-inspired costume drama about Richard III of England, which became Séjour's most acclaimed work. Toward the end of his life, however, Séjour declined in status as his plays fell out of favor.

Written in French, "Le Mulâtre" had little influence on American literature of the period. It was not translated into English until the late 20th century, when Séjour became the subject of new academic studies in the United States. Its condemnation of slavery, however, anticipates the work of such 19th-century African-American writers publishing in English as Frederick Douglass and William Wells Brown. Both men had escaped from slavery to freedom in Northern states.

== The Brown Overcoat (1858) ==
Séjour tended to leave discussions of race out of his plays. This is best exemplified by his play The Brown Overcoat, a typical artificial comedy of the time period with witty comments and puns, avoiding race and social commentary entirely. Despite this, Séjour is recognized as a great African-American playwright, who had a successful career in France.

== Personal life ==
Séjour was reared as Catholic like his parents and learned French as his first language.

== Bibliography ==
- Victor Séjour; Philip Barnard (translator). "The Mulatto." In Nellie Y. McKay and Henry Louis Gates (editors). The Norton Anthology of African American Literature Second edition, Norton, 2004. ISBN 0-393-97778-1
- Victor Séjour; Norman R. Shapiro (translator). The Jew of Seville. University of Illinois Press, 2002. ISBN 0-252-02700-0
- Victor Séjour. "Le Mulâtre". Revue des Colonies Paris, 3:9 (March 1837), pages 376–392.
- Brickhouse, Anna. Transamerican Literary Relations and the Nineteenth-Century Public Sphere. Cambridge: Cambridge University Press, 2004.
- Hatch, James V., and Ted Shine. Black Theatre USA: Plays by African Americans. New York: Free, 1996. Print.
