= Gaston Gerville-Réache =

Guadeloupean politician

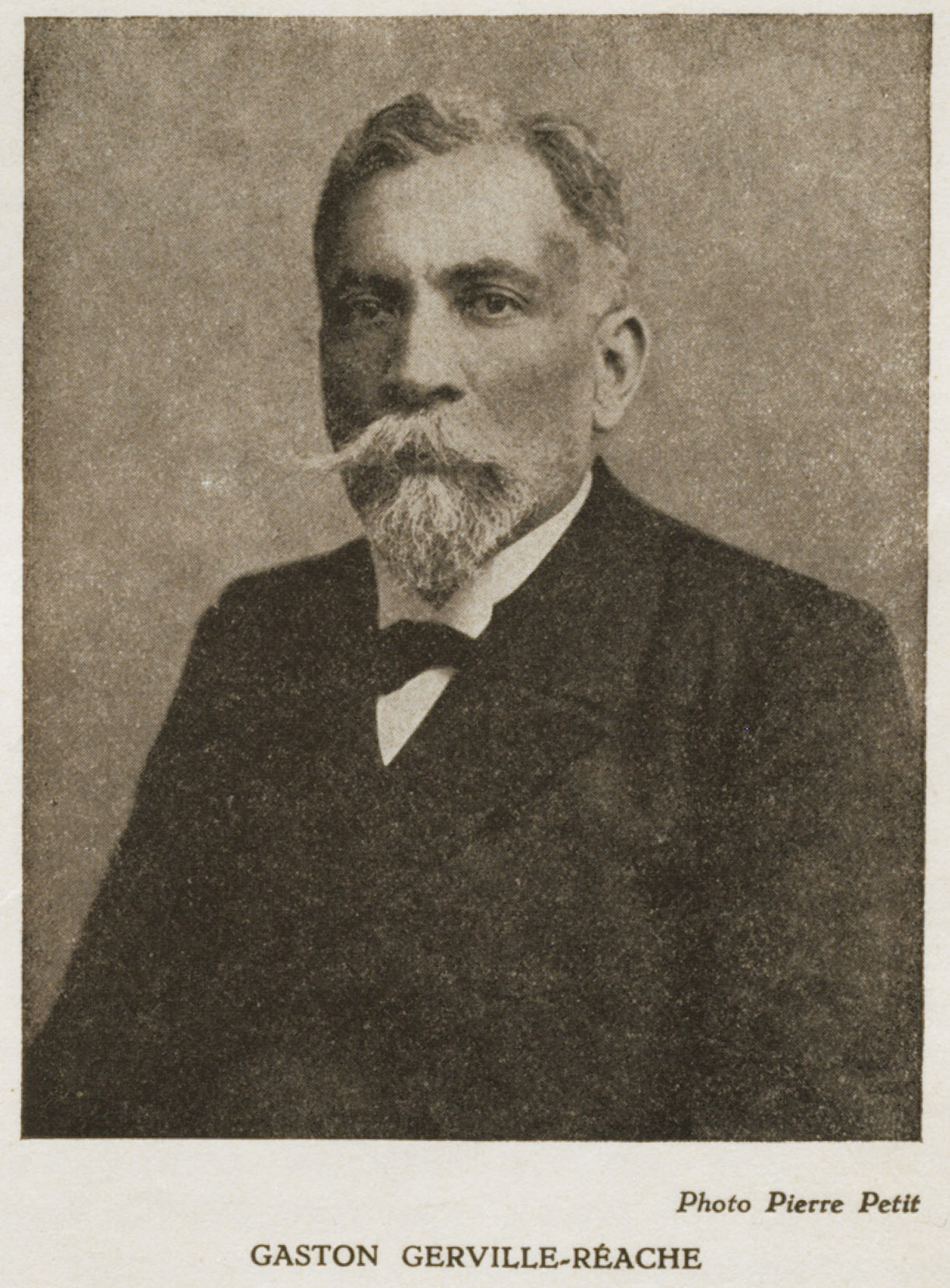
Gaston Gerville-Réache

Gaston Gerville-Réache (born 23 August 1854 in Pointe-a-Pitre, Guadeloupe; died 30 May 1908 in Mareil-en-France, France) was a politician from Guadeloupe who served in the French National Assembly from 1881 to 1906. His daughter was Opera Singer Jeanne Gerville Reache Rambaud.

== Biography ==
A lawyer and former professor of philosophy in Haiti, Gaston Gerville-Réache was a disciple of Victor Schœlcher and enjoyed living in the Latin Quarter, where he remained for twenty years. He studied in Paris, where he was admitted to the Paris Bar. He then joined La Justice as a legal editor. He was a Freemason, as were many politicians born in the colonies at the time.

Gaston Gerville-Réache remained faithful to the liberal republican tradition. After the passage of the law on the indigenous regime in 1881, he was one of the founders of the French Society for the Protection of Indigenous Peoples in the Colonies, whose board of directors was composed entirely of colonial deputies.

In 1879, he became a member of the committee organizing the banquet celebrating the anniversary of the abolition of slavery, which brought together abolitionists and colonial deputies every year.

Gaston Gerville-Réache described himself as “radical by principle but opportunistic by circumstance” . Representative of Guadeloupe 1st district (La Basse-Terre) from 1881 to 1906, he founded the newspaper Le Moniteur des Colonies in 1882, in collaboration with Victor Schœlcher.

In 1893, he conducted the funeral ceremonies for Victor Schœlcher.

He was elected vice president of the House in 1904.

A high school in Basse-Terre, Guadeloupe, bears his name.

His grandnephew, Lucien, also followed a political career, serving as a general councilor and poet, and was the father of singer-songwriter Laurent Voulzy.

== Bibliography ==
- Gaston Gerville-Réache page on the French National Assembly website
