= François Perrinon =

French military officer (1812–1861)

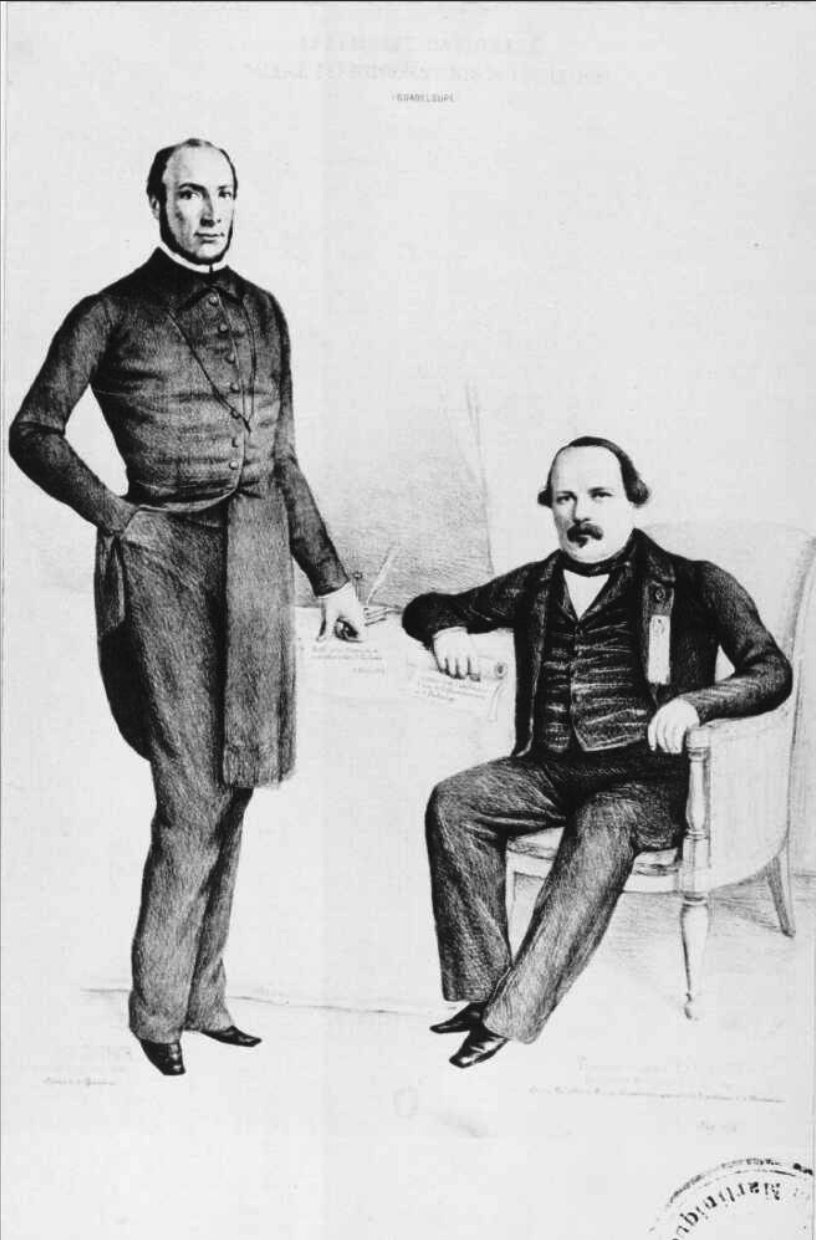
Victor Schœlcher (left) and François-Auguste Perrinon (right)

François-Auguste Perrinon (August 28, 1812 – January 1, 1861) was an Afro-Caribbean French military officer, politician and abolitionist.

Perrinon was born at Saint-Pierre, Martinique from a free black mother and a white father, who married in 1826. In 1832, he enrolled at the école polytechnique, the first Afro-descendant student to do so. Perrinon graduated in 1834 and chose to become a Marine Artillery Officer. He was promoted Captain in 1840, the same year he married Marguerite-Louise-Charlotte Télèphe, another Martiniquaise of mixed descent. In 1842, he was sent to the Caribbean as officer in the French garrison on the isle of Guadeloupe. Perrinon was promoted Major and awarded the Legion of Honour in 1847.

He was of anti-slavery sympathy, and in 1847, in a pamphlet he authored entitled "Résultats d'expérience sur le travail des esclaves" ("The Slave-Labor Experience") describing events on the isle of Saint Martin, he argued that the work being performed by slaves at the time could just as well be performed by free people and at equal cost. A year later, he was appointed to the Commission for the Abolition of Slavery by Victor Schœlcher, Under-secretary of State of the Colonies in the new Republican Government, and was sent to Martinique as "Commissioner of Abolition", later becoming General Commissioner and holding that post from June to November 1848. In 1849, he was elected, along with Victor Schœlcher, deputy to the French National Assembly.

The National Assembly was dissolved in the wake of Napoléon III's coup d'état of 2 December 1851. Perrinon then returned to the Caribbean to live on Saint Martin, where he was involved in operations in salt marshes. His refusal, in a letter of 18 April 1853, to take an oath of allegiance to Napoléon III resulted in his expulsion from the military. Perrinon died in 1861 in Saint Martin.
