= Joseph Saint-Rémy =

Haitian historian

Joseph Saint-Rémy (c. 1818–1856) was a Haitian historian. He is best known for his biography La Vie de Toussaint Louverture about the Haitian Revolution leader Toussaint L'Ouverture, and for his work Pétion et Haïti, about another Revolutionary figure, Alexandre Pétion. Born in Guadeloupe, Saint-Rémy emigrated to Haiti as a young child and grew up in Les Cayes before leaving for school in France.

== Selected works ==
- La Vie de Toussaint Louverture
- Pétion et Haïti
- Les Mémoires de Boirond-Tonnerre
- Les Mémoires deToussaint Louverture
