= Statue of Victor Schœlcher =

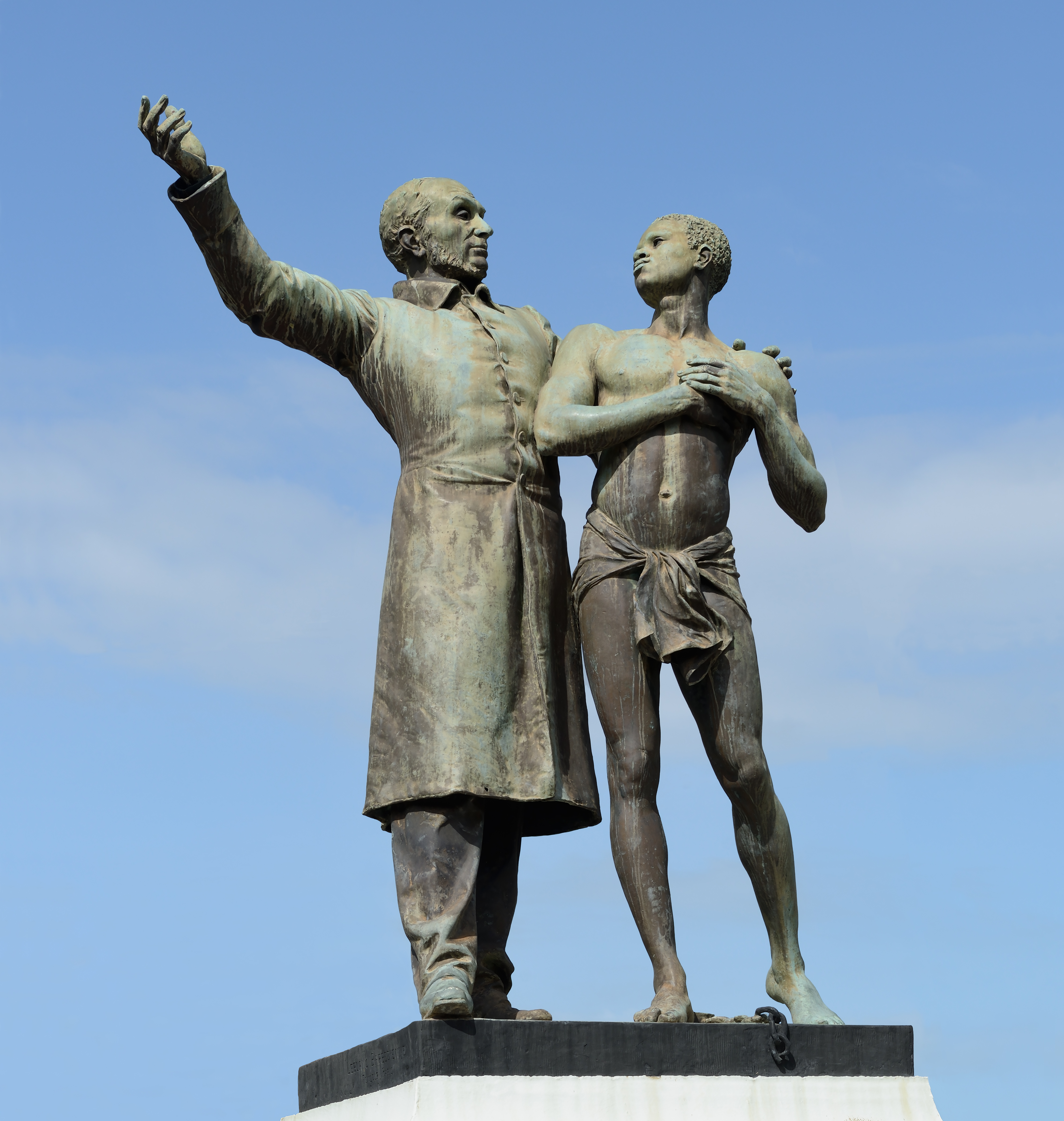
- Interactive map of Statue of Victor Schœlcher

The Statue of Victor Schœlcher (French: Statue de Victor Schœlcher) is a bronze statue sculpted in 1896 by Louis-Ernest Barrias, then dedicated the following year in Cayenne in French Guiana, then a colony of France. The work celebrates Victor Schœlcher, who played a leading role in the abolition of slavery in 1848, representing him alongside a recently emancipated slave.

It was classified as a historic monument in 1999. Criticized for its paternalism and lack of attention to the role of free and enslaved black people in the abolition movement, it was covered during protests in 2017. Then in 2020, in the context of the COVID-19 pandemic and reactions to the murder of George Floyd, it was the object of vandalism before being taken down.

== Location ==
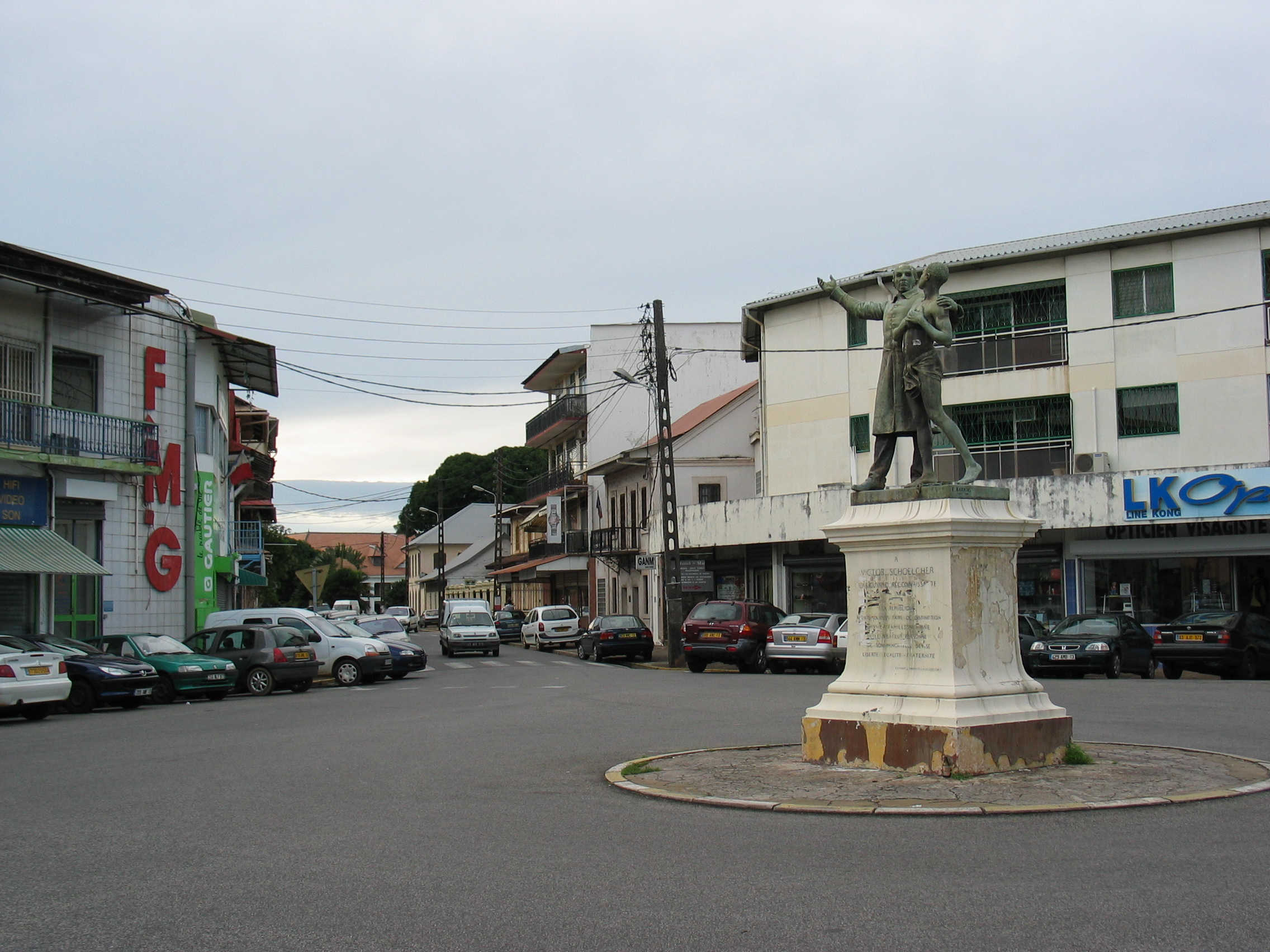
Victor-Schœlcher Square in Cayenne, in 2003.

The statue is located in Cayenne.

It stood until 2020 in Victor-Schœlcher Square, previously Victor-Hugo Square. This square is located at the intersection of rue Louis-Blanc, rue du Docteur-Sainte-Rose, and rue des Peuples-autochtones (previously rue Christophe-Colomb).

The statue was taken down in 2020 and placed in a city warehouse.
