= Victor Schœlcher =

19th-century French abolitionist

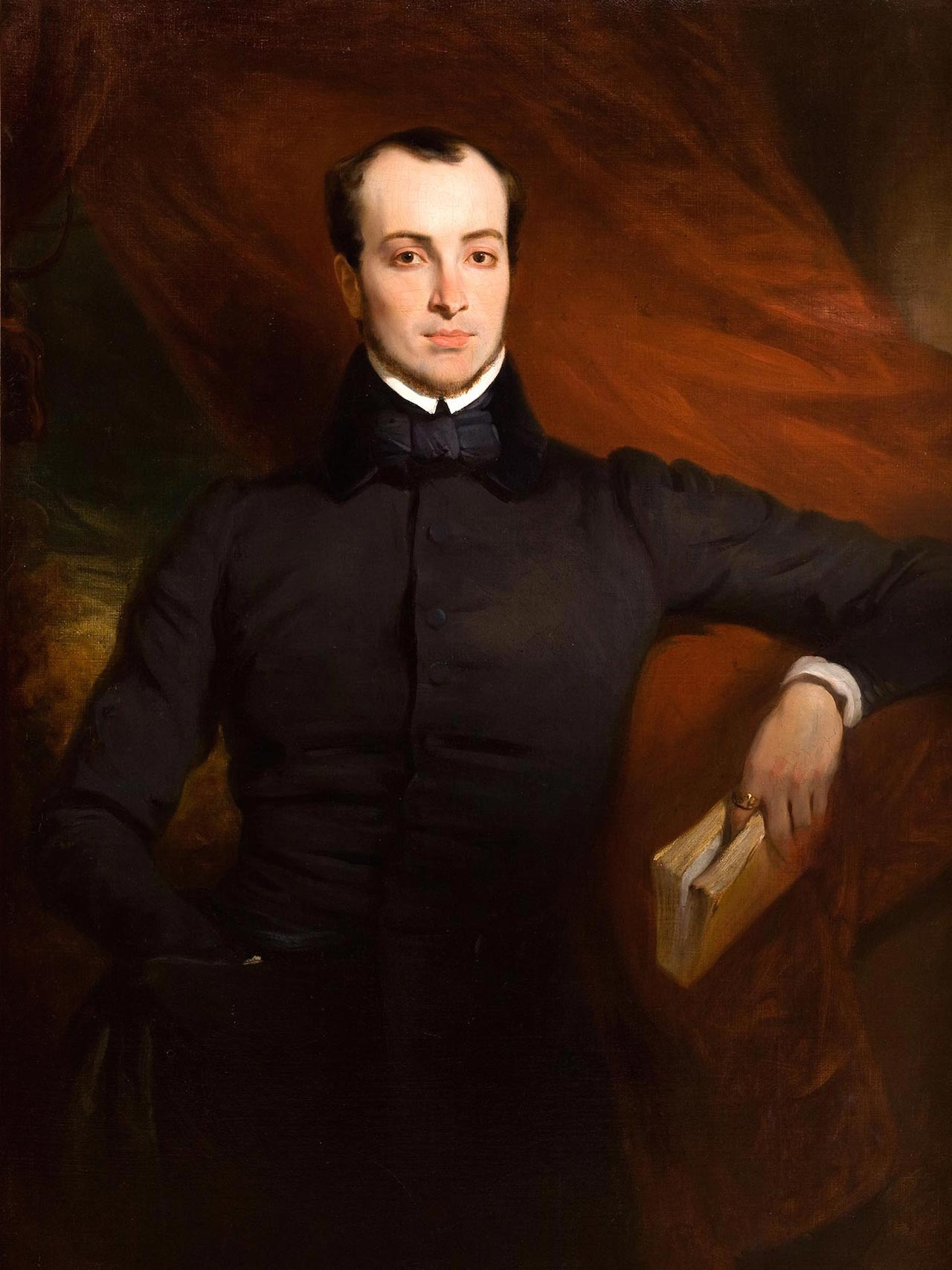
- Portrait by Henri Decaisne, 1832

Member of the National Assembly
- In office 9 August 1848 – 26 May 1849
- Constituency: Martinique
- In office 24 June 1849 – 17 October 1849
- Constituency: Guadeloupe
- In office 13 January 1850 – 2 December 1851
- Constituency: Guadeloupe
- In office 12 March 1871 – 7 March 1876
- Constituency: Martinique

Personal details
- Born: 22 July 1804 Paris, France
- Died: 25 December 1893 (aged 89) Houilles, France
- Resting place: Panthéon
- Party: The Mountain (Second Republic); Republican Union (Third Republic)

Victor Schœlcher (French: [viktɔʁ ʃœlʃɛʁ]; 22 July 1804 – 25 December 1893) was a French abolitionist, writer, politician and journalist, best known for his leading role in the abolition of slavery in France in 1848, during the Second Republic.

== Early life ==
Schœlcher was born in Paris on 22 July 1804. His father, Marc Schœlcher (1766–1832), from Fessenheim in Alsace, was the owner of a porcelain factory. His mother, Victoire Jacob (1767–1839), from Meaux in Seine-et-Marne, was a laundry maid in Paris at the time of their marriage. He was baptized in Saint-Laurent Church on 9 September 1804.

He enrolled in the Lycée Louis-le-Grand in 1818, but left one year later and began working at the family's porcelain factory in the rue du Faubourg Saint-Denis. In his teenage years Schœlcher became an opponent of the Bourbon monarchy while frequenting the literary and political salons of Paris. In 1820, at the age of 16, he joined Freemasonry, being initiated into the Parisian lodge Les Amis de la Vérité (Grand Orient de France), which was at the time very strongly politicized, not to say openly revolutionary. He later moved to another Parisian lodge, La Clémente Amitié.

== Abolitionism ==
In 1828, Schœlcher was sent by his father on an eighteen months-long trip in America, as a representative of the family's porcelain enterprise. While in the continent he visited Mexico, Cuba, and the southern United States. During this trip he learned much about slavery and began his career as an abolitionist writer, and returning to France in 1830 he published his first writing in the Revue de Paris, an article titled Des noirs ("Of the blacks"), in which he proposed a gradual abolition of slavery. Schœlcher inherited the family business on his father's death in 1832, but sold it on in order to dedicate himself to his abolitionism. In the following years he traveled through Europe, and in 1840 went to the West Indies to further study slavery and the results of its abolition in the British colonies. Next he went to Egypt, Greece and Turkey, where he studied Muslim slavery, and finally to West Africa, traveling through Senegal and Gambia between September 1847 and January 1848.

With the knowledge on slavery acquired in his travels—including that plantation owners did not educate the people they enslaved—Schœlcher became an advocate for the immediate emancipation of slaves, no longer supporting a gradual process. He published these ideas in Des colonies françaises: Abolition immédiate de l'esclavage ("Of the French colonies: Immediate abolition of slavery") in 1842, following his return from the West Indies. He was a member of the Société française pour l'abolition de l'esclavage ("French Society for the Abolition of Slavery") founded in 1834, modeled after contemporary British abolitionist societies. After the early 1830s he was also a republican activist in France, and was one of the founders of the progressive newspaper La Réforme in 1843, to which he was a regular contributor.

Schœlcher elaborated on social, economic, and political reforms he believed would be necessary to the Caribbean colonies after the abolition of slavery. He argued that the production of sugar could continue, though it should be rationalized with the construction of large central factories, and opposed the concentration of land ownership. Schœlcher was the first European abolitionist to visit Haiti after its independence, and had a large influence on the abolitionist movements in all of the French West Indies. He was actively against the debt collected from the Haitians as French slave owners sought reparations for their property lost in the Haitian Revolution.

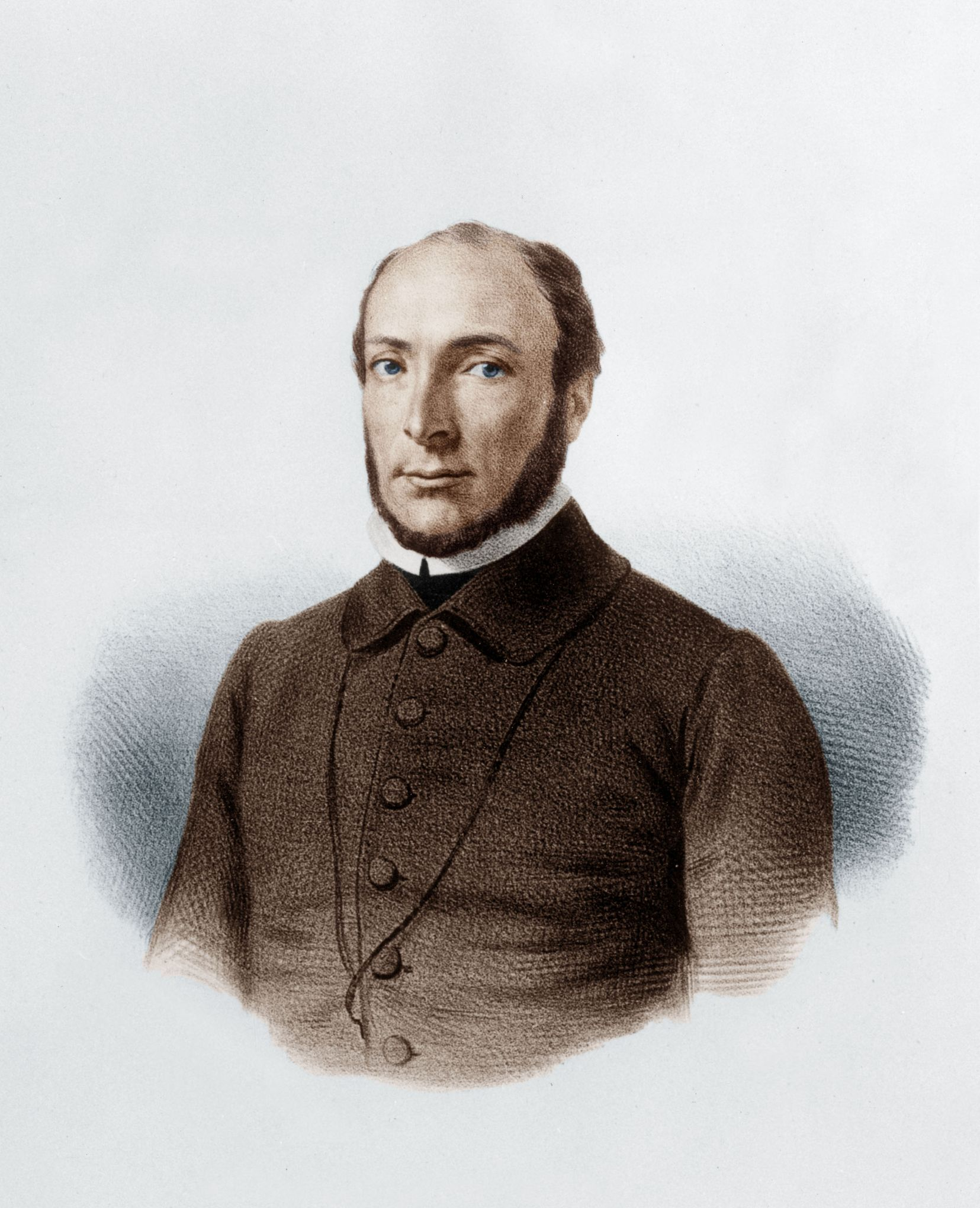
Schœlcher in 1848, by Louis Stanislas Marin-Lavigne

In February 1848, a revolution in France overthrew the July Monarchy. Schœlcher arrived from Senegal on 3 March, and quickly went to meet with François Arago, the Minister of the Navy and Colonies of the provisional government of the new Republic. Arago appointed him under-secretary of state for the colonies the next day, as well as president of a new commission charged with drafting the immediate abolition of slavery, with Louis Percin and Henri-Alexandre Wallon assigned as secretaries.

Schœlcher had convinced Arago not to wait until the election of the constituent National Assembly, which would be deeply occupied with organizing the new republican institutions, to establish the abolitionist commission, arguing that any postponing of the emancipation could lead to revolt and bloodshed in the colonies. In his capacity as under-secretary of state and president of the commission, Schœlcher prepared and wrote the decree that was issued on 27 April 1848, through which the French government abolished slavery in all of its colonies and granted citizenship to the emancipated slaves.

== Later career ==
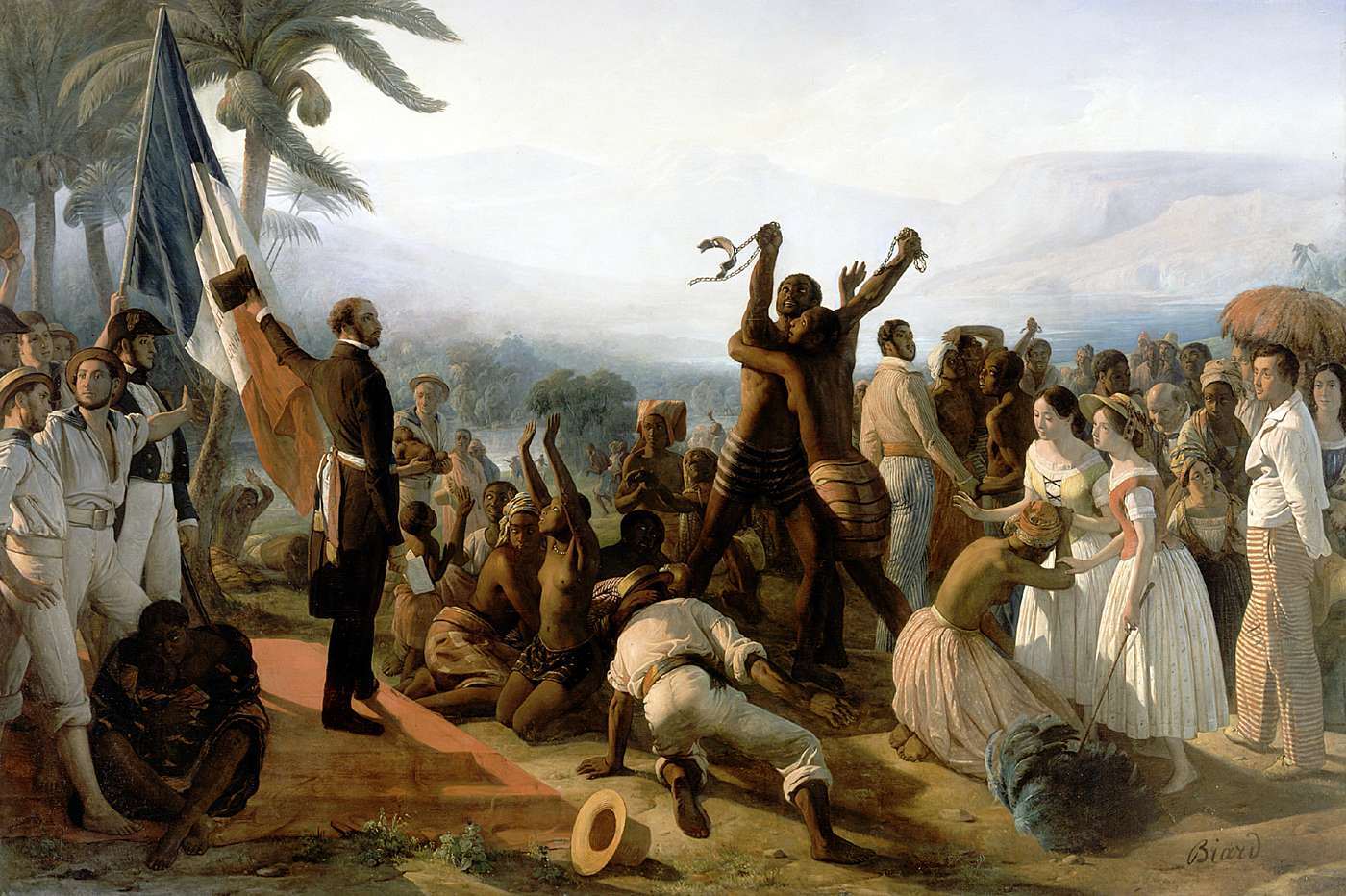
Proclamation of the Abolition of Slavery in the French Colonies, 27 April 1848 by François-Auguste Biard

Schœlcher's ultimate success in ending slavery gave birth to a new republican movement in the Caribbean colonies. He was elected deputy to the National Assembly in 1848 by the department of Martinique. The next year he ran for reelection but lost to Cyrille Bissette, a former "free man of colour" and abolitionist, but won in Guadeloupe and was again elected for that department in 1850. He introduced a bill for the abolition of the death penalty, which was to be discussed on the day on which President Louis-Napoléon Bonaparte seized power with a coup d'état, on 2 December 1851, dissolving the National Assembly. The next day Schœlcher, alongside Jean-Baptiste Baudin, was one of the few deputies present at the barricades in Paris to resist the coup.

Schœlcher was then exiled by the new regime. He lived briefly in Belgium before moving to London, where he settled in 1852. In the following years he became a specialist in the work of Georg Friedrich Handel, writing a biography of him in 1857. At the same time he published multiple writings criticizing Napoleon III, formerly president of France and now monarch of the Second French Empire, in works such as Dangers to England of the alliance with the men of the Coup d'État, which Schœlcher wrote in English and published in 1854. During this period he became a friend of fellow republican exile Victor Hugo.

Refusing to take advantage of the amnesty of 1859, Schœlcher only returned to France in late August 1870, after the declaration of war with Prussia. He was appointed staff colonel of the National Guard on 4 September, the day of the deposition of Napoleon III and the proclamation of the Third Republic. Organizing a legion of artillery, he took part in the defence of Paris. In 1871 he was again elected by Martinique for the National Assembly in Bordeaux, where he voted against the peace treaty. During the subsequent Paris Commune insurrection, Schœlcher tried unsuccessfully to mediate peace talks between the insurgents and the French government, and was briefly imprisoned by the communards. Afterwards he continued to serve in the National Assembly as a member of the Republican Union, and was elected senator for life in December 1875.

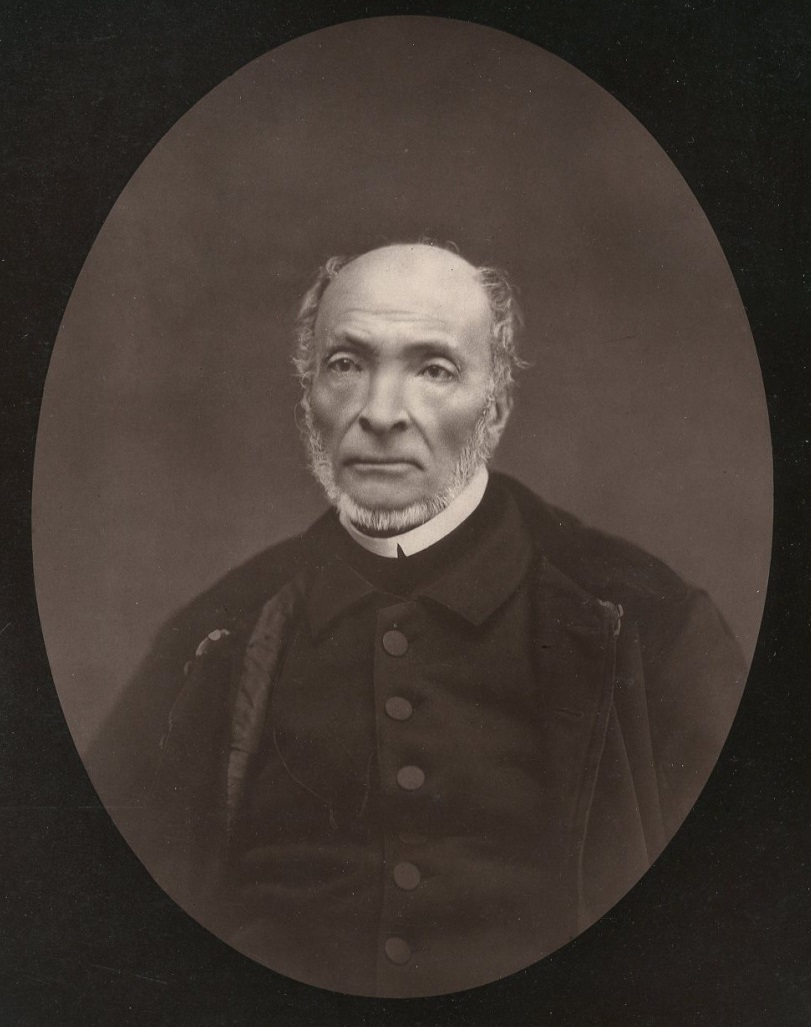
Photograph of Schœlcher by Étienne Carjat, between 1876–1884

In 1875, Schœlcher became a member of the Societé pour l'amélioration du sort de la femme ("Society for the improvement of women's condition"), and in July 1876 he renewed his proposal for the abolition of capital punishment. In 1882 he co-founded, with Gaston Gerville-Réache, the newspaper Le Moniteur des Colonies. Schœlcher published his last work in 1889, a biography of Haitian revolutionary leader Toussaint Louverture (Vie de Toussaint Louverture). He died on 25 December 1893 in his house in Houilles, near Paris, aged 89.

== Legacy ==
Having never married or left issue, in his will Schœlcher distributed his money and donated his collection to Guadeloupe, which is now housed at the Schœlcher Museum (Musée Schœlcher) in Pointe-à-Pitre. First buried in the Père Lachaise Cemetery, his remains were transferred on 20 May 1949 to the Panthéon on the initiative of Senator Gaston Monnerville from Guiana. Schœlcher had wanted to be buried with his father Marc, who was therefore also interred in the Panthéon. The ashes of Félix Éboué, the first black person to be buried in the Panthéon, were transferred at the same time. In 1981, the newly elected President François Mitterrand placed a rose at Schœlcher's tomb in the Panthéon on the day of his inauguration ceremony.

=== Homages ===
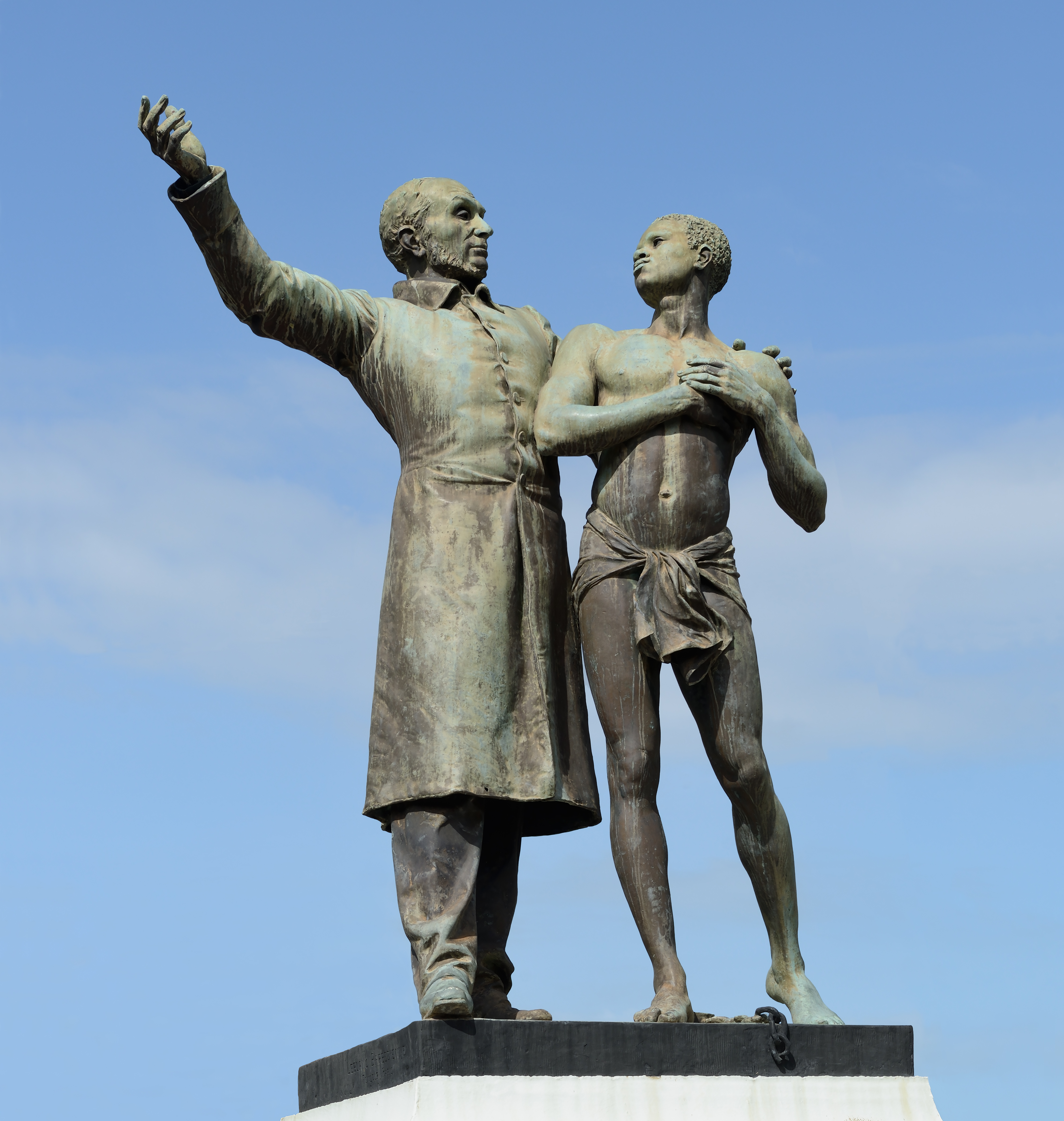
Statue of Schœlcher with a freed slave celebrating the 1848 abolition of slavery, in Cayenne. Sculpted by Louis-Ernest Barrias, it was listed as a monument historique in 1999 and removed from view in 2020.

- In homage to his fight against slavery, the commune of Case-Navire (Martinique) took the name of Schœlcher in 1888.
- The commune of Fessenheim turned his family's house into the Victor Schœlcher museum.
- The Place Victor Schœlcher in Aix-en-Provence is named after him.
- A street created at the south-eastern corner of the Montparnasse Cemetery in Paris was named Rue Schœlcher in 1894 and Rue Victor Schœlcher in 2000.
- Two ships of the French Navy have been named Victor Schœlcher – an auxiliary cruiser during World War II, and a Commandant Rivière-class frigate in service from 1962 to 1988.
- On 20 May 2020, two statues of Schœlcher were destroyed in Martinique. French President Emmanuel Macron criticized the acts. Another statue was destroyed in March 2021; their destruction was supported by activists from the separatist "National Front for the Liberation of Martinique", and represents part of wider protests against "colonial memory".
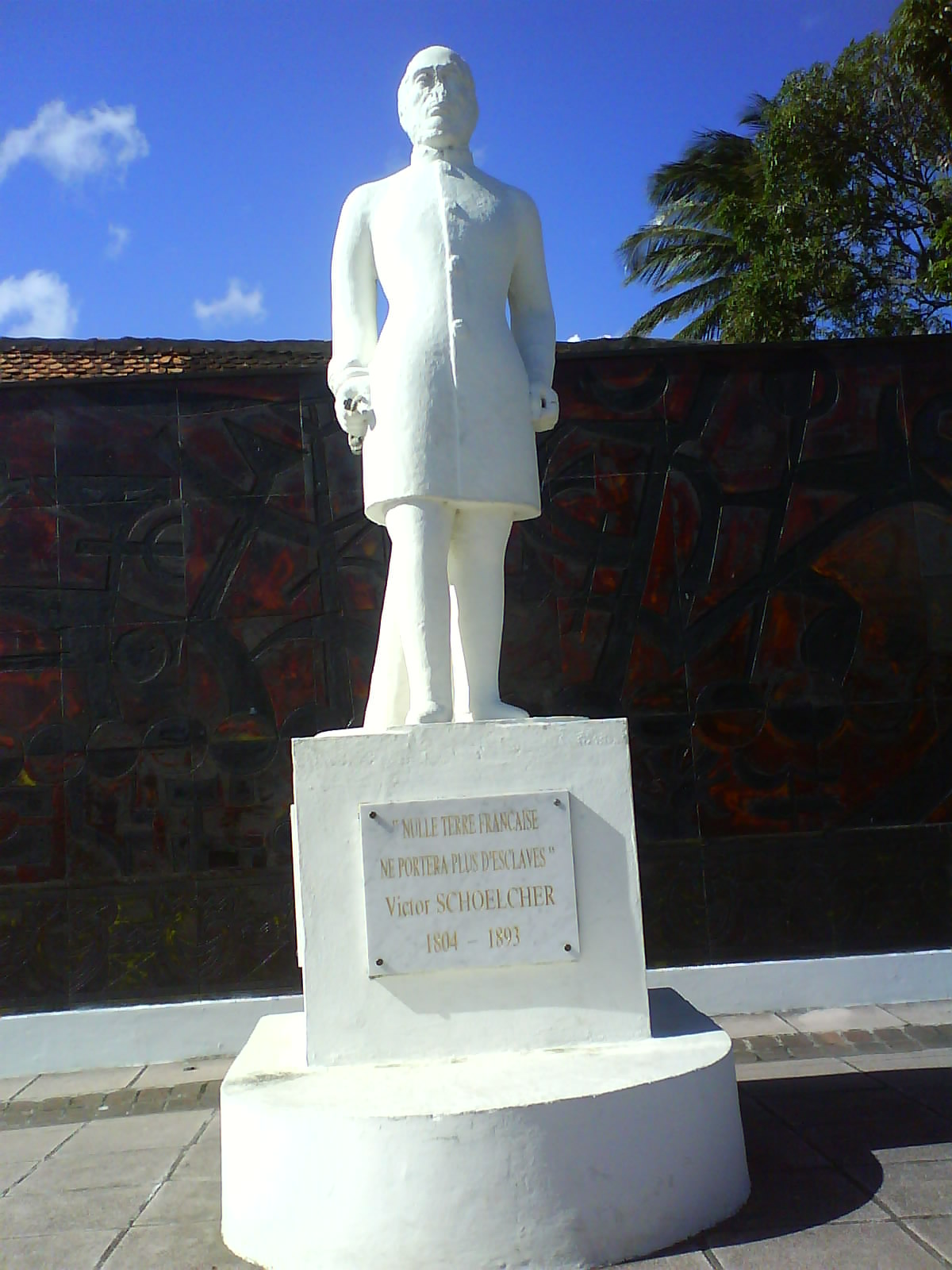
- Statue of Schoelcher in Martinique
  He was honored by the department of Réunion on a commemorative note of five thousand francs first issued in 1946.

== Works ==
- De l'esclavage des noirs et de la législation coloniale (On slavery of blacks and colonial legislation) (Paris, 1833)
- Abolition de l'esclavage (Abolition of slavery) (1840)
- Les colonies françaises de l'Amérique (French colonies of America) (1842)
- Les colonies étrangères dans l'Amérique et Hayti (Foreign colonies in America and Haiti) (2 vols., 1843)
- Histoire de l'esclavage pendant les deux dernières années (History of slavery during the last two years) (2 vols., 1847)
- La verité aux ouvriers et cultivateurs de la Martinique (The truth to the workers and farmers of Martinique) (1850)
- Protestation des citoyens français negres et mulatres contre des accusations calomnieuses (Protests of black and mulatto French citizens against slanderous accusations) (1851)
- Le procès de la colonie de Marie-Galante (The trial of the Marie-Galante colony) (1851)
- Histoire des crimes du 2 décembre (History of the crimes of the 2 December) (1852)
- Le gouvernement du 2 décembre (The government of the 2 December) (1853)
- Dangers to England of the alliance with the men of the Coup d'État (1854)
- Vie de Händel (Life of Handel) (1857)
- La grande conspiration du pillage et du meurtre à la Martinique (The great conspiracy of theft and murder in the Martinique) (1875)
- Vie de Toussaint Louverture (1889)

== Bibliography ==
- Jan Rogozinski, A Brief History Of The Caribbean (New York: Plume, 2000)
- James Chastain, Victor Schœlcher. Encyclopedia of 1848 Revolutions (2004)
- Wilson, J. G.; Fiske, J., eds. (1900). "Schœlcher, Victor" . Appletons' Cyclopædia of American Biography. New York: D. Appleton.

== Bibliography ==
- Schœlcher, Victor. De la pétition des ouvriers pour l'abolition immédiate de l'esclavage, Paris, Pagnerre, 1844. Manioc
- Schœlcher, Victor. Restauration de la traite des noirs à Natal, Paris, Imprimerie E. Brière, 1877. Manioc
- Schœlcher, Victor. Evénements des 18 et 19 juillet 1881 à Saint-Pierre (Martinique), Paris, Dentu, 1882. Manioc
- Schœlcher, Victor. Conférence sur Toussaint Louverture, général en chef de l'armée de Saint-Domingue, [s.l.], Editions Panorama, 1966. Manioc
- Monnerot, Jules. Schœlcher, [s.l.], Imprimerie Marchand, 1936. Manioc
- Basquel, Victor. Un grand ancêtre: Victor Schœlcher (1804–1893), Rodez, Imprimerie P. Carrère, 1936. Manioc
- Magallon Graineau, Louis-Alphonse Eugène. L'exemple de Victor Schœlcher, Fort-de-France, Imprimerie officielle, 1944. Manioc
