= Revue des colonies =

French abolitionist journal

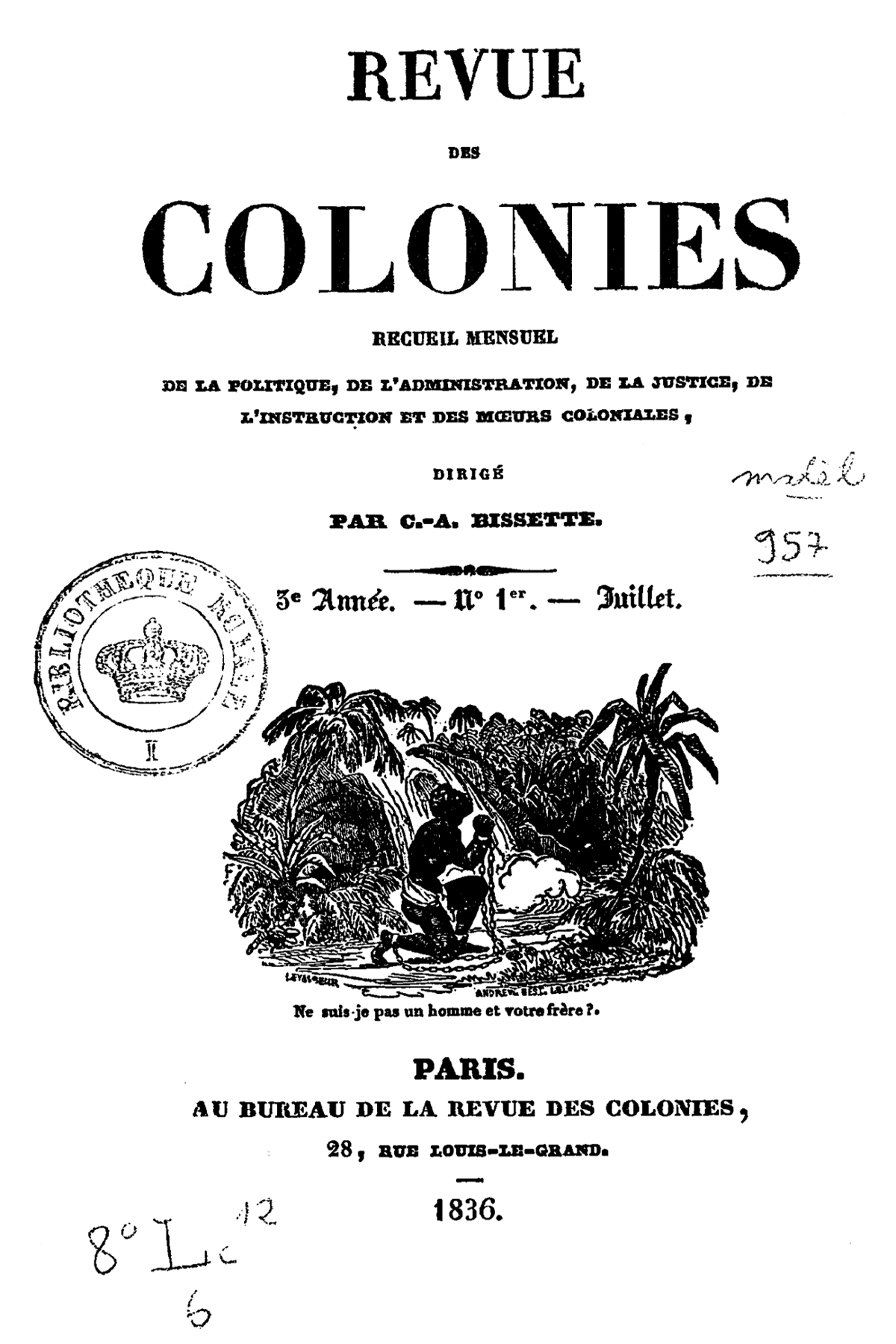
Cyrille Bissette, Revue des colonies, Une juillet 1836

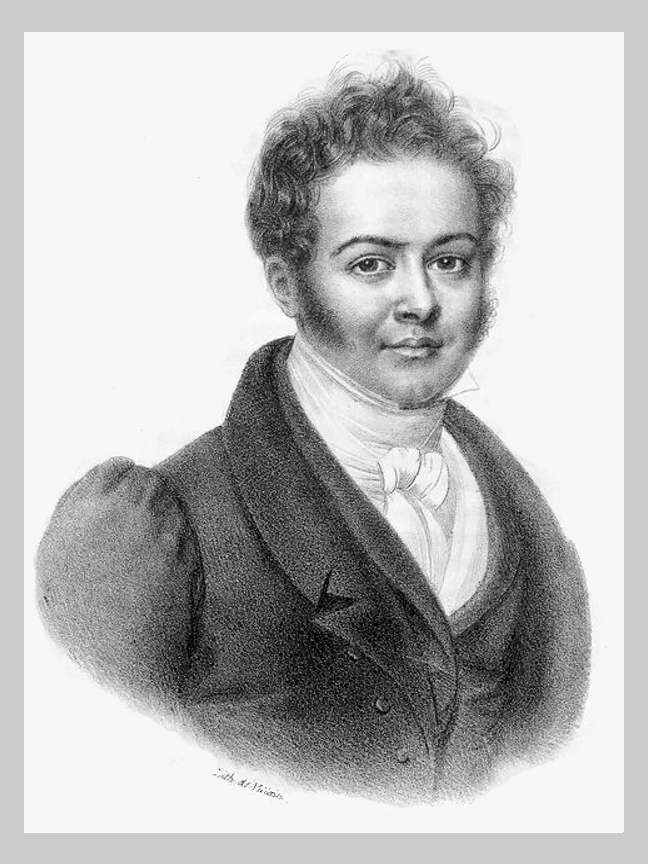
Cyrille Bissette

The Revue des colonies was a French journal published in Paris from 1834 to 1843 that campaigned for the abolition of slavery, particularly in the French colonies.

It was under the leadership of Cyrille Bissette (1795 to 1858), the politician and founder of the Société d'hommes de couleur.

The monthly journal gives an overview of the state of the French and foreign colonies at that time. The Revue des colonies is the first French abolitionist journal written by black people; it was to become the bane of the French planters, especially those of Martinique, whom Bissette never forgave throughout the July Monarchy for branding him with an iron and expelling him during the Bourbon Restoration. The first edition of July 1835 contains the bill formulated by the author for the immediate abolition of slavery.

== See also ==
- Society of the Friends of the Blacks

== Literature ==
- Lawrence C. Jennings: La France et l'abolition de l'esclavage. 2010
