= Jean Boudet =

French general (1769–1809)

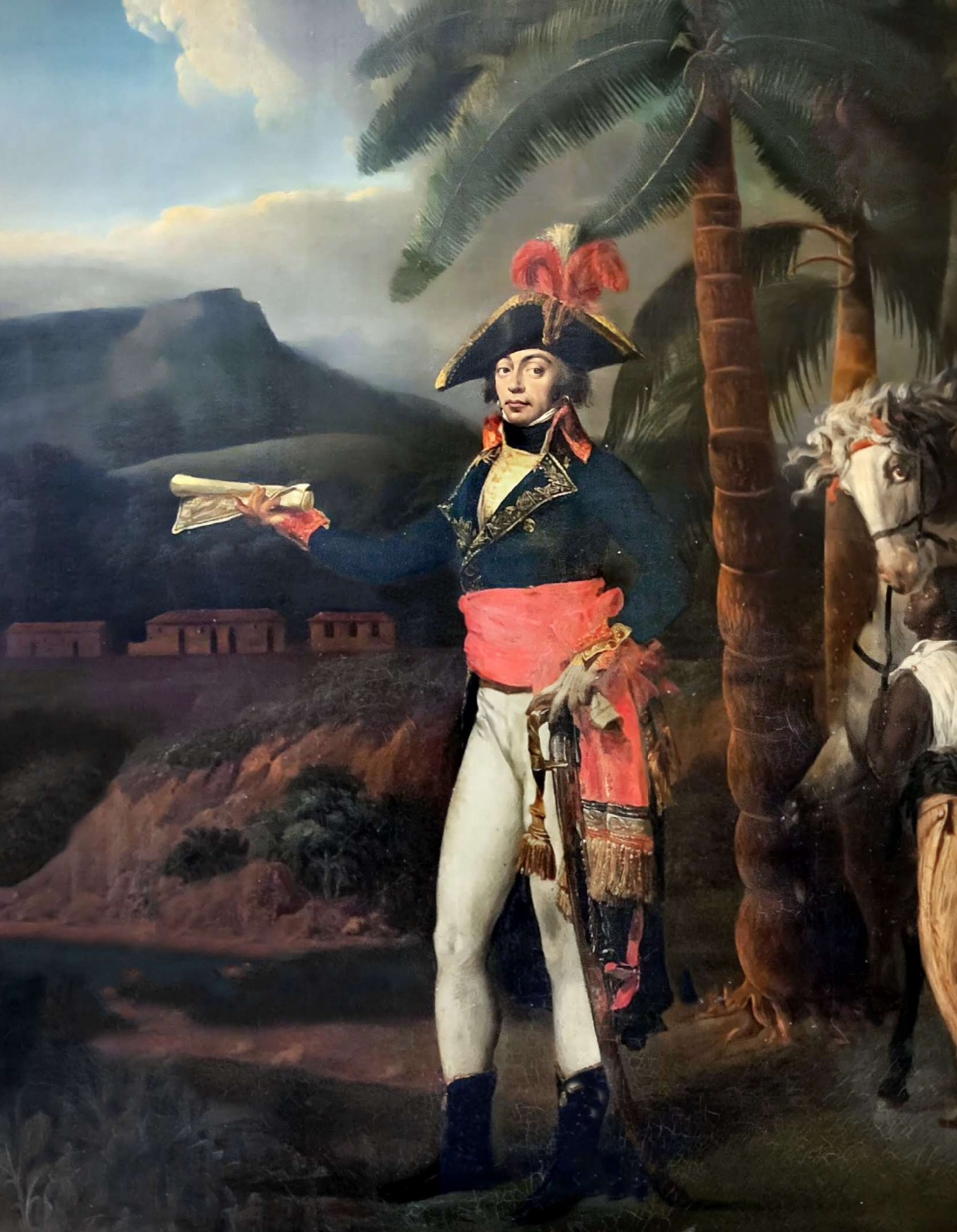
- Portrait by Marie-Guillemine Benoist, 1798–1803
- Born: 9 February 1769; Bordeaux, France
- Died: 14 September 1809 (aged 40) Moravské Budějovice, Austrian Empire
- Allegiance: Kingdom of France; Kingdom of the French; First French Republic; First French Empire
- Branch: Army
- Service years: before 1785 – 1809
- Rank: Général de division
- Commands: 4th division of IV army corps
- Conflicts: French Revolutionary Wars; Siege of Toulon; Battle of Marengo; Saint-Domingue expedition; Napoleonic Wars; Battle of Essling
- Awards: Comte de l'Empire; Légion d'honneur Order of the Iron Crown

Jean Boudet (French pronunciation: [ʒɑ̃ budɛ]; 9 February 1769 – 14 September 1809) was a French general of division of the French Revolutionary Wars and the Napoleonic Wars. The campaigns in which he was involved include the Saint-Domingue expedition. Boudet was made a grand officer of the Legion of Honour on 2 June 1809 and a knight of the Order of the Iron Crown, as well as a Count of the Empire in 1808. His name is engraved on the 16th column of the east side of the Arc de Triomphe in Paris.

== Life ==
Boudet began his military career as a sous-lieutenant in the légion de Maillebois, before becoming a dragoon in the régiment de Penthièvre in 1785. Later, on the formation of the National Guards, he entered a battalion of volunteers in Gironde as a lieutenant in 1792. In 1793 he gained distinction for his bravery at the 1793 fighting at Château-Pignon and assisted at the Siege of Toulon as a captain, then in 1794 he fought in the War in the Vendée.

He set off from île de Ré for Guadeloupe (then occupied by the British) with the rank of lieutenant-colonel, beside Victor Hugues, on 21 April 1794. He was landed at Pointe des Salines and captured fort Fleur d'épée and the town of Pointe-à-Pitre, strongly defended by the British. He was made chef de brigade on 18 June 1794 and then général de brigade and supreme commander of all land forces on Guadeloupe on 14 December 1795. On 28 December 1794, at Pointe-à-Pitre, he married Marie Joseph Elisabeth Augustine Darboussier. He completed the conquest of the island by a long series of brilliant feats of arms and the French Directory (via Victor Hugues and Lebas) raised him to the rank of général de division. Boudet headed some dragoons to punish the rebellion of Le Lamentin in December 1797 and then, after two years and having made the island defensible, he returned to France in April 1799 to take part in the Dutch campaign, under the command of general Brune. After 18 brumaire, he joined the armée de réserve, commanded by Berthier and being readied for Italy. He led the vanguard in the second Italian campaign of Napoléon Bonaparte and gained distinction at the head of his division, especially at Lodi and Marengo, being wounded at the latter.

=== Saint-Domingue expedition ===
Just as peace accords were being signed with the British in London (1 October 1801), Boudet was chosen for the expedition being prepared for Saint-Domingue due to his colonial experience (as were other leaders of this expedition, such as Edme Étienne Borne Desfourneaux and Donatien-Marie-Joseph de Rochambeau). On 8 October he was put in command of the troops gathered at Rochefort, which would form the core of his division on Saint-Domingue. Leaving Brest on 11 December 1801 and landing at Port-au-Prince on 5 February 1802, Boudet treated its black, white and creole inhabitants equally and was thus made very welcome. Operating in isolation from the rest of his supreme commander Charles Leclerc's troops, Boudet easily captured Léogâne (11 February) then followed Jean-Jacques Dessalines's bloody trail as far as Saint-Marc (25 February), then to the redoubt at Crête-à-Pierrot. He assaulted the redoubt on 11 March, being wounded in the heel by shrapnel and forced to abandon his command of the division to Rochambeau. The Haitian historian Alexis Beaubrun Ardouin (slightly suspected of pro-French bias) writes that Boudet was almost unique in his humanity towards enemy soldiers or prisoners, gaining respect even from his enemies.

During this time Magloire Pélage's provisional government on Guadeloupe, wishing to prove its loyalty to the government of mainland France, demanded that Leclerc send him Boudet to take command of the island until Paris officially sent it a new governor. He was still highly appreciated by Guadeloupe's inhabitants since his previous time on the island and thus left Saint-Domingue for Guadeloupe on 21 April 1802, but unfortunately general Antoine Richepanse's expedition reached the island before him (6 May) and Richepanse's brutal command immediately ignited a revolt there by Louis Delgrès and his companions. Boudet reached the island on 28 May but his presence there rapidly became useless and he returned to Saint-Domingue, where he was put at the head of the division in the north in September before being sent back to France by Leclerc on 28 September to inform Bonaparte of the dramatic situation. This was a trusted mission given to an officer whose merit he praised, though in correspondence Leclerc later accused Boudet of embezzlement during his time on Saint-Domingue.

=== Napoleonic Wars ===
General Boudet was welcomed back to France as a hero and made commander of the 1st Infantry Division in the corps of general Claude-Victor Perrin (26 October 1803) in the northern Netherlands. He then moved to the corps under general Auguste Frédéric Louis Viesse de Marmont, at the Utrecht camp (5 February 1804). He took part in the 1805 campaign under Marmont before being sent to the armée d’Italie in 1806. In 1807 he was in Germany and took part in the siege of Kolberg under the command of Murat and, after the Treaties of Tilsit, captured Stralsund. In return for Boudet's services, Napoléon made him a comte d'Empire in 1808 and gave him land with a revenue of 30,000 francs in Swedish Pomerania. He took up garrison duties in the Hanseatic towns and was in the front rank during the Austrian campaign of 1809 at the head of the 4th Division of the 4th Army Corps commanded by marshal André Masséna. General Boudet assisted in the capture of Vienna then distinguished himself in the fierce defence of the village of Essling (21–22 May 1809), turning a granary into an impregnable bunker. He lost his artillery at the Battle of Wagram on 6 July, however, leading to fierce public criticism from Napoleon. He died on 14 September, shortly after a humiliating interview with Napoleon earlier that day, either by suicide or dying of despair.

== Bibliography ==
- Mullié, Charles (1852). "Boude (Jean, comte)" . Biographie des célébrités militaires des armées de terre et de mer de 1789 à 1850 (in French). Paris: Poignavant et Compagnie.
- Six, Georges (1934). "Boudet (Jean, comte)". Dictionnaire biographique des généraux et amiraux français de la Révolution et de l'Empire: 1792–1814 (in French). Vol. 1. Paris: Librairie Historique et Nobilaire. pp. 136–137.
- (in French) Alexis Beaubrun-Ardouin, Étude sur l'histoire d'Haïti, t.5
- (in French) Maurice Begouën-Demeaux, Mémorial d'une famille du Havre: Stanislas Foäche (1737–1806), t.5
- (in French) Laura Virginia Monti, A calendar of Rochambeau's papers at the university of Florida Libraries
- (in French) Jan Pachonski et Reuel K. Wilson, Poland's Caribbean tragedy: a study of Polish legions in the Haitian war of Independence, 1802-1803
