= La Mulâtresse Solitude =

Historical figure, heroine on French Guadeloupe (c. 1772 – 1802)

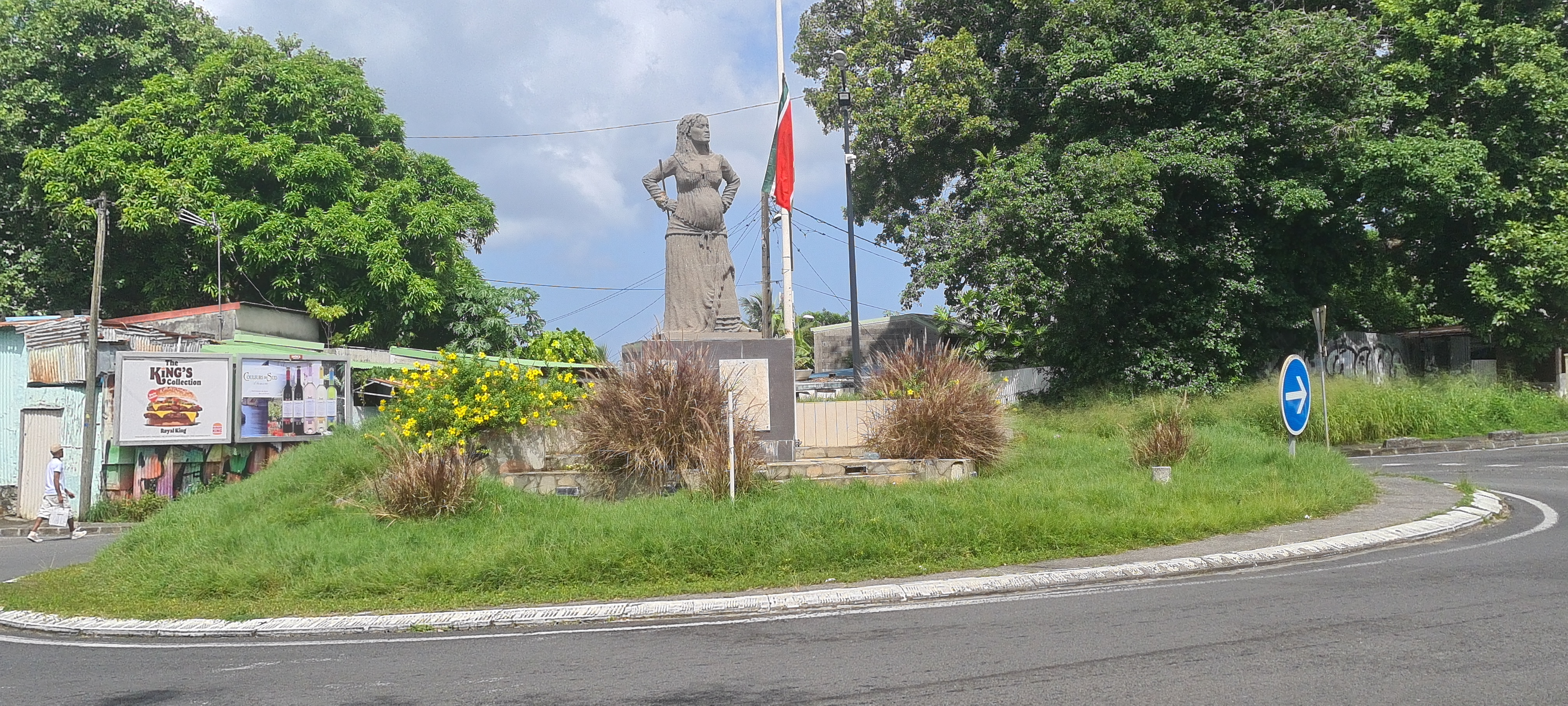
Les Abymes (1999).

La Mulâtresse Solitude (circa 1772 – 1802) was a historical figure and heroine in the fight against slavery on French Guadeloupe. She was imprisoned and executed by French forces after their suppression of the 1802 insurrection against the reinstatement of slavery in Guadeloupe, which culminated in mass suicide in the battle of Matouba. She has become the subject of legend and a symbol of women's resistance in the struggle against slavery in the history of the island.

== Historical record ==
The only contemporary mention of Solitude comes from Auguste Lacour in his book Histoire de la Guadeloupe, an exploration of the administrative archives on the 1802 rebellion against the reinstatement of slavery. Originally written in French, he says this about the maroon leader:

La mulâtresse Solitude, who came from Pointe-à-Pitre to Basse-Terre, was then in the Palermo camp. She let her hatred and fury burst out on all occasions. She had rabbits. One of them having escaped, she armed herself with a pin, ran, pierced him, lifted him up, and presented him to the women in the prison: 'Here', she said, mixing with her words the most offensive epithets, 'this is how I will treat you when it is time!' And this unfortunate woman was about to become a mother! Solitude did not abandon the rebels and remained close to them, like their evil genius, to excite them to the greatest crimes. Finally arrested in the company of a gang of insurgents, she was sentenced to death, but the sentence had to be postponed. She was executed on 29 November, after her delivery.

== Fictional biography, modern legend ==
Solitude is recorded nowhere else, but she inspired André Schwarz-Bart to write his work of historical fiction in the novel entitled "La Mulâtresse Solitude". This invents many details of the lives of Solitude and her mother, who Schwarz-Bart calls Bayangumay. This novel has been the source of most of the information that people now accept about Solitude and her story.

In Schwarz-Bart's account, and widely in later legend, Solitude was the product of a rape by a Frenchman on a slaveship that brought her mother to the Caribbean. Her mother is said to have died when she was only eight years old. She escaped slavery together with her mother while she was still alive, joining a maroon community in the hills of Guadeloupe with other Black people who had escaped their captors.

She was called "La Mulâtresse" ('Female Mulatto') because of her origin, which had some importance for her in the racial hierarchy of the society of the time: because she was noted to have pale skin and pale eyes, she was given domestic work rather than being forced to work in the fields.

Her last words were "live free or die", which became the mantra of the resistance movement, and in poems, songs, libraries, historical markers, museums and statues, and today symbolizes the spirit of the country.

=== Historical context ===
Napoleon Bonaparte, having come to power in late 1799, decided to reinstate slavery abolished by the Convention, and enacted the Law of 20 May 1802, reinstating slavery in the French colonies. The Guadeloupeans, having tasted freedom, put up resistance. An officer named Joseph Ignace, having organized resistance in Pointe-à-Pitre, joined his men with those of another insurgent, Louis Delgrès, a free mulatto officer. Solitude was among those who rallied around Delgrès and fought by his side for freedom.

On May 21, 1802, General Richepanse stormed the fort where refugees Delgrès, Ignace, and their men were. On May 22, Ignace and Delgrès exited by the postern gate of Galion. The bridge over the river Galion was to become a marking point of this fight. Ignace, having gone on the road to Pointe-à-Pitre, died in battle. Delgrès went to Matouba, on the way to Saint-Claude.

On May 28, along with 400 others, Delgrès was in a losing battle against the French armies; they decided to blow themselves up with gunpowder in efforts to kill as many French soldiers as possible.

Solitude survived, but was imprisoned by the French. Because she was pregnant at the time of her imprisonment, her execution was delayed until she had given birth.

== Legacy and legend ==
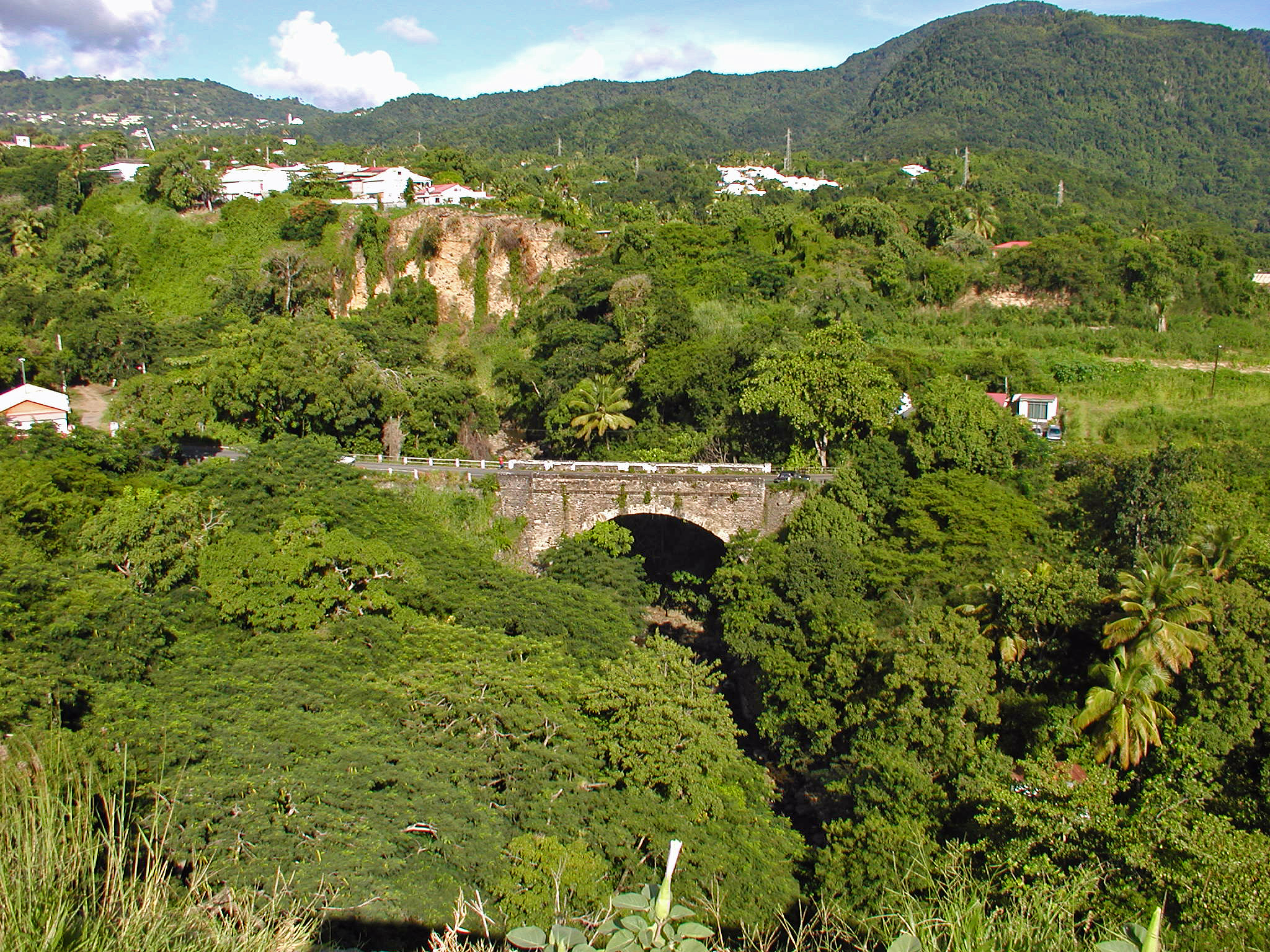
The bridge over the river Galion, an arched bridge built by the Abbé of Talcy between 1773 and 1780, 35 metres (115 ft) over the river

Solitude's story is widely known throughout the Caribbean and France, inspiring many different artists and institutions to pay homage to her life. She represents the greater women's struggle against slavery, and as such she is commemorated in many different ways.

In 1999, a statue by Jacky Poulier was placed on Héros aux Abymes Boulevard in Guadeloupe (16°14′50″N 61°31′44″W) in her memory.

In 2007, another statue was erected in her memory, this time in the Hauts-de-Seine in the Île-de-France region, for the celebration of the abolition of slavery and the slave trade. The statue is made of iroko, a kind of African hardwood. According to its sculptor Nicolas Alquin, it is the first memorial to all "enslaved people that resisted."

In 2008, Pascal Vallot was inspired by her life for a musical comedy.

In 2011, as part of a housing construction project, the town of Ivry-sur-Seine decided to name a new road "allée de la mulâtresse Solitude" which was inaugurated in 2014.

A street is inaugurated in her name in the town of Les Abymes in Guadeloupe.

The 46th class of the Nantes Regional Institute of Administration bears her name.

In 2019, Solitude is the main character in the novel Spigaoù by Frédéric Lesgrands-Terriens.

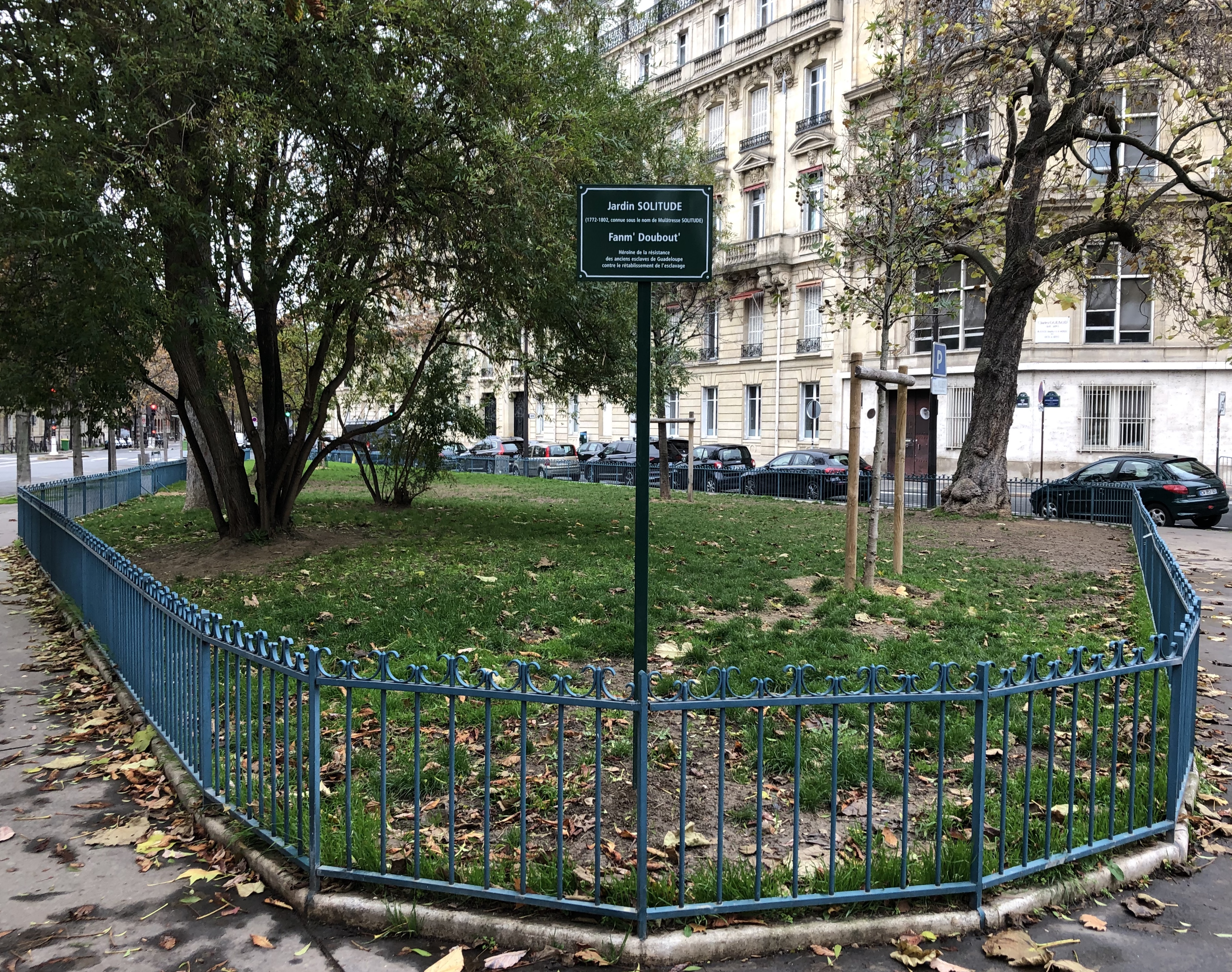
Jardin Solitude, in Paris (2020)

On September 26, 2020, Anne Hidalgo, Mayor of Paris, and Jacques Martial, former director of Mémorial ACTe and Paris Councillor Delegate in charge of Overseas Territories, inaugurate the “Jardin Solitude” (Solitude Garden) (north lawns of the Place of Général-Catroux - 17th district). They announced the project to eventually install her statue in this garden. This would be the first statue of a black woman in Paris - which only counts 40 historical women among the thousand or so statues in Paris.

Guadeloupe Solitude, as she is also known, is being currently considered for inclusion in the French Panthéon that celebrates the memory of distinguished French citizens.

In May 2022, the French Post released a postal stamp labelled "Solitude v.1772-1802" to commemorate Solitude.

Drawing of La Mulâtresse Solitude

== See also ==
- List of slaves
