= Joseph Ignace =

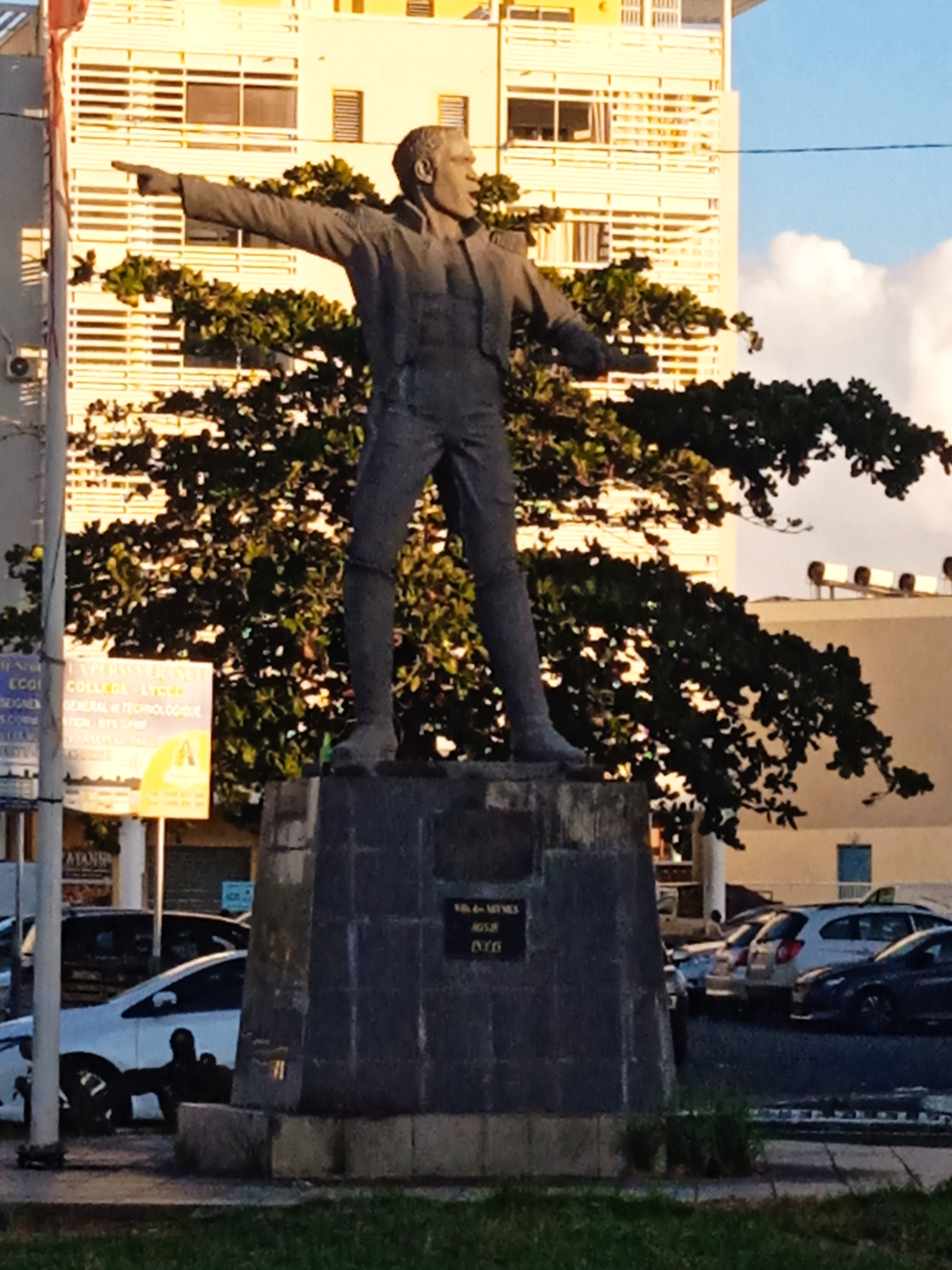
Statue of him by Jacky Poulier.

Joseph Ignace (1769 or 1772 - 25 May 1802) was a French army officer who opposed the reestablishment of slavery in France's American colonies in 1802 by Napoleon. This made him a symbol for later anti-slavery campaigners and independence activists on Guadeloupe, with a statue of him and a primary school named after him on boulevard de Baimbridge, both in Les Abymes.

== Life ==
He was born a free black man in Pointe-à-Pitre, Guadeloupe and worked as a carpenter before taking part in the uprising in the town in 1792. He joined the army of the French First Republic, becoming a captain in 1801, a chef de bataillon the following year and finally commander of the now-destroyed fort de la Victoire in Pointe-à-Pitre. He took part in the military uprising against the island's governor Jean-Baptiste Raymond de Lacrosse, who was arrested on 24 October 1801.

After the Peace of Amiens, général de division Antoine Richepance and 3740 troops landed at Pointe-à-Pitre on 6 May 1802. Richepance decided immediately to replace the forts' black garrisons with his own troops. Captain Rougier was made commander of Fort de la Victoire and Ignace (who would later kill Rougier) led his men to join Louis Delgrès's rebellion against Richepance on 10 May. Richepance and chef de brigade Magloire Pélage led a force to attack Baimbridge, upon which Ignace killed himself in Les Abymes on 25 May, fulfilling his oath to "live free or die".

== Bibliography (in French) ==
- Roland Anduse (1989). Joseph Ignace, le premier rebelle - 1802, la révolution antiesclavagiste guadeloupéenne. Pointe-à-Pitre: Édition Jasor..

== External links (in French) ==
- Joseph Ignace, l’autre suicidé
- Mai 1802 - Baimbridge
