= Jacky Poulier =

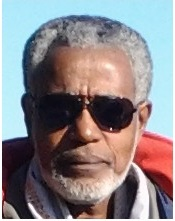
Poulier.

Omer Poulier, known as Jacky Poulier (born 10 September 1951) is a French sculptor and academic.

Born at Pointe-à-Pitre on Guadeloupe, he is also a professor of earth sciences and life sciences. He has worked in earth, rope, plaster, epoxy, iron and other media.

== Selected works ==
=== Les Abymes ===
- Joseph Ignace (1769 ou 1772–1802), 1998, carrefour de Mortemol
- The Mulatto Solitude, carrefour de Lacroix (1772–1802), 1999, carrefour de Lacroix, Boulevard des Héros, Les Abymes
- Memorial to Delgrès's Sacrifice, 26 May 2001, rond-point de Dugazon.

=== Other ===
- Monument for the 50th Anniversary of the Société Immobilière Guadeloupe, 2001
- Monument of the Hundred Chains, 2003, stone and iron, place de la Victoire, Pointe-à-Pitre, marking the execution of a hundred abolitionist insurgents on 26 May 1802 and the sixty victims of a revolt by workers and unions in 1967.
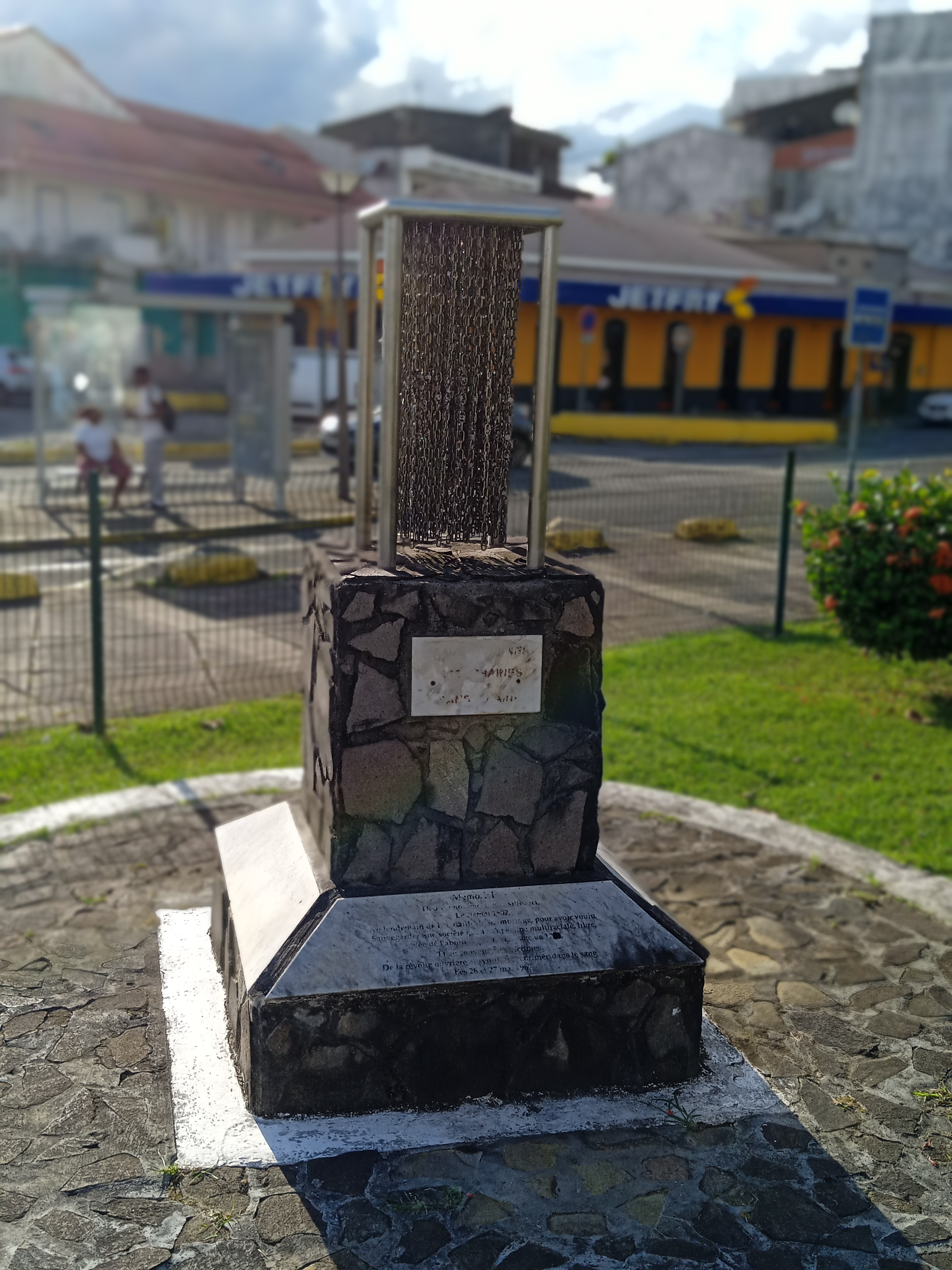
Blood, chains; 100 chains; unchained.

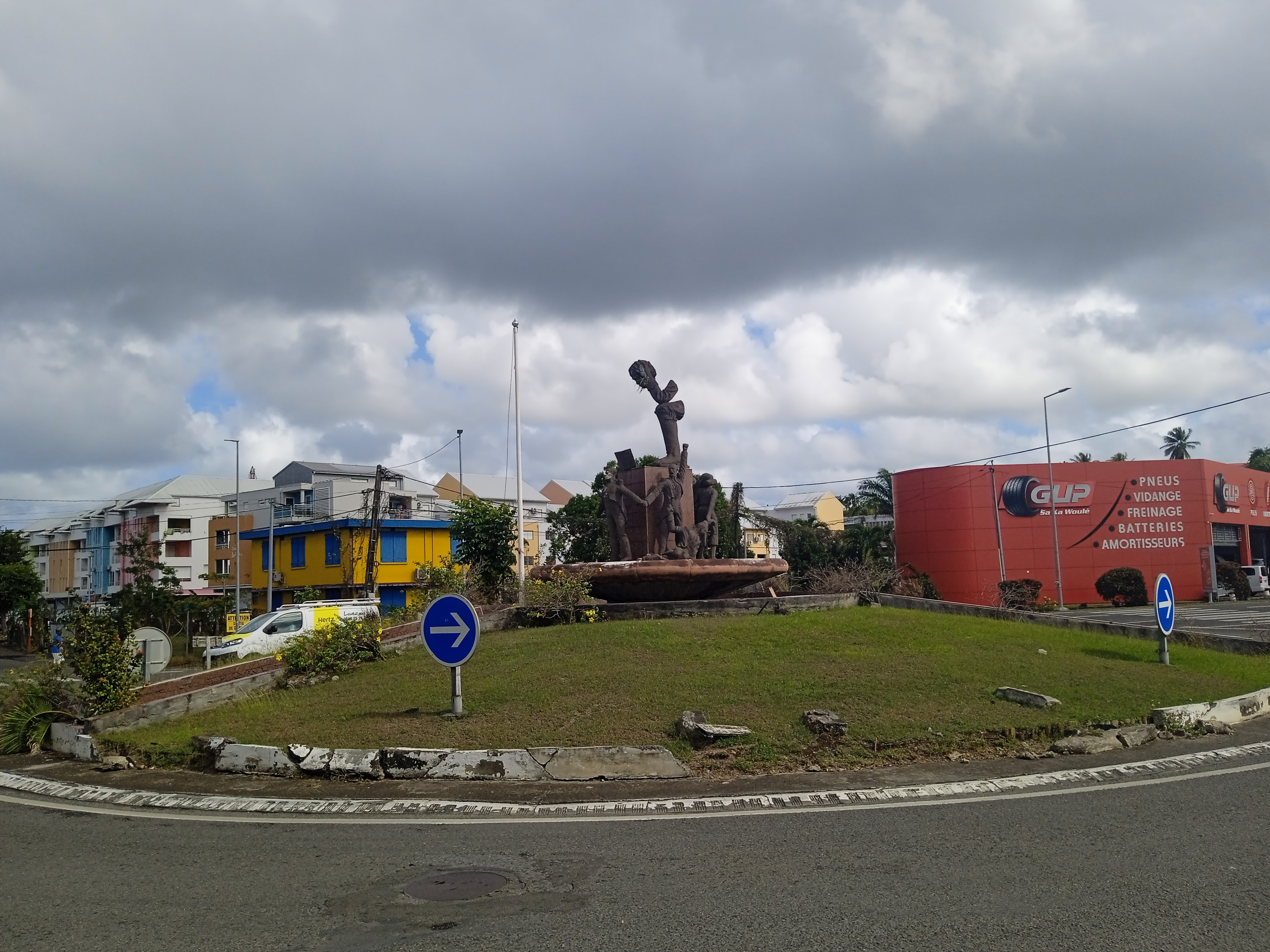
Memorial to Delgrès's Sacrifice

== Exhibitions ==
- 1995, July 1997, June 2015 - Salle Rémy Nainsouta, Pointe-à-Pitre, solo exhibitions
- 1996:
  - August - 'Indigo 96', Fort Fleur d'épée, Le Gosier
  - December - 'Couleurs Outre-Mer', fort Delgrès, Basse-Terre
- 1997:
  - March - Exhibition with the painter J. Rô, centre Manioukani, Rivière-Sens
  - August - 'Indigo 97', Centre des Arts, Pointe-à-Pitre
  - September - Group exhibition, Galerie Espace-Vert, Centre Commercial Continent
- 20 November to 19 December 2009 - 'Negropolitan Museum', L'Herminier Museum, Pointe-à-Pitre
