= Magloire Pélage =

Magloire Pélage (19 May 1767 – 17 April 1810) was a French army officer, mainly known for his indirect part in the reinstatement of slavery in the French colonies in 1802.

== Life ==
=== Youth ===
He was baptised in the parish of Saint-Laurent, Le Lamentin, Martinique on 31 May 1767, with the register recording him as a mixed-race boy born out of wedlock to Marie-Rose, a free mulatto woman. His godfather was his uncle Louis Lenclume, a mason, also a mulatto. However, Pelage's marriage register entry in 1801 stated he was a "son of citizen Leblanc and citizen Francine Leblanc, living in Le Lamentin, Martinique".

Some of his biographies state he was born a slave or became a free man of colour. Sources describe him as a "câpre" (literally "goat") or a "mulâtre foncé" (literally "dark mulatto"), meaning a child of a union between a mulatto man or woman and a black man or woman. However, on the two occasions he was captured by the British, he (like Louis Delgrès) was sent to prison hulks in Britain reserved for white soldiers, whereas men enslaved before 1794 were re-sold or returned to the former owners, since Britain did not abolish slavery until 1833.

=== Volunteer ===
He initially worked as a mason like Lenclume but on 1 February 1793 the new French First Republic declared war on Britain, putting Martinique under threat of invasion. That month the island's governor Donatien de Rochambeau raised colonial militia units (equivalent to the National Volunteers in mainland France), consisting mainly of black volunteers either freeborn or freed by the Republic's abolition of slavery. (Note: Each 17th and 18th century war by European colonial powers led them to raise units in the Americas consisting of free or freed black and mixed-race people and of slaves, with the latter given their freedom (after eight years' military service in the case of French units raised in the early 1790s).) Pélage was one of them, becoming a private in the 1st Martinique Chasseur Battalion and rising to sergeant on 1 April 1793.

Life was tense in the French Antilles at the time due to friction between royalists and republicans, conservatives and revolutionaries and planters, enslaved people and free people of modest means. On 8 June 1793 Pélage was wounded in the thigh facing royalist troops in an assault on the morne Vert-Pré. He was made a lieutenant on 10 December 1793 and put in command of a demi-company.

=== Defence of the Bouillé lunette ===
On 5 February 1794 a British fleet landed 6,000 men near La Trinité. Republican French troops regrouped after a few battles in the town of Fort-République (now Fort-de-France). Rochambeau and his troops from mainland France moved into Fort de la Convention (now fort Desaix), qui dominated the town and the bay from the top of morne Garnier, while he garrisoned fort de la République (now fort Saint-Louis) with the colonial militia. From 18 February that year the unit under Pélage's command was assigned to defend the redoubt at the centre of the Bouillé lunette, a ravelin with a few cannon named after François Claude de Bouillé, 500m to the north-east of fort de la Convention (14°37′17.64″N 61°3′43.59″W).

The British laid siege works opposite the redoubt and their batteries opened fire on 7 March, particularly targeting the redoubt, where Pélage was wounded on 8 March. Its scarp collapsed under fire but the small garrison managed to repulse several assaults. Firing stopped on 20 March and Rochambeau signed the surrender on 23 March after fort de la République fell and dissension began to arise in his garrison. The surrender document treated the garrison differently to the laws of war, with freed men returned to their former masters or sold off, but freeborn men sent to Britain - Delgrès and Pélage were among the latter.

=== Rising through the ranks ===
Captured French officers were then exchanged for captured British ones. Pélage was then attached to the Antilles Battalion as a captain in October 1794. Arriving on Guadeloupe he took part in the capture of Saint Lucia and was promoted to chef de bataillon on 3 July 1795. Following the recapture of Sainte-Lucie by the British in 1796 he was wounded in the left arm, captured again and sent to Britain a second time. He remained in prison in Portsmouth for 18 months before being exchanged in October 1797. He landed at Fécamp, joined general Antoine de Béthencourt at Rouen and followed him to Morlaix. On 15 September 1798 he was sent to the île d'Aix, where more and more black troops were gathering.

He was promoted to chef de brigade (equivalent to colonel) on 24 August 1799. On 16 November the same year he departed for Guadeloupe as aide de camp for the French Directory agents Nicolas-Georges Jeannet-Oudin, Étienne Maynaud de Bizefranc de Lavaux and René Gaston Baco de La Chapelle. The island was tense - although the abolition of slavery had been applied there in June 1794 (unlike on Martinique, then occupied by the British), former slaves were mainly still dependent on their former masters, leading them to join the army or privateers or to resort to vagrancy. Civic equality as per the decree of 16 October 1791 was still being proclaimed but colonial society remained heavily racially segregated.

In August 1801, on general Béthencourt's death, contre-amiral Jean-Baptiste Raymond de Lacrosse took command of the garrison, proscribing opponents, dismissing soldiers and letting émigrés return. This behaviour exacerbated tensions between leading figures and soldiers on the island and on 24 October the same year a soldiers' uprising began, which eventually arrested Lacrosse and expelled him from the island on 5 November 1801 Lacrosse took refuge on Dominica and sent letters to mainland France with two lists of rebels, one of civilians and the other of soldiers. In those lists, twenty-six were white, two were black and twenty-five were mulattos. He also dubbed the rebellion "Jacobin" and "anarchist".

Pélage joined the uprising and after Lacrosse's expulsion commanded the commanded the Port-de-la-Liberté (Pointe-à-Pitre) arrondissement, acting as head of the 'Provisional Government Council' for the island, sending several letters to the First Consul protesting his loyalty to the Republic. Despite these tensions Pélage married Anne-Charlotte Mantet (born 11 July 1785 at Fort-Royal) at Pointe-à-Pitre on 23 October 1801. She was a legitimate daughter of Charles Louis, a free mulatto, and his wife Berthilde. Pélage became the island's commander-in-chief and custodian of power until general Antoine Richepance's arrival.

=== Richepance in the Antilles ===
The Peace of Amiens returned Martinique to France and the government took advantage of this to regain control of its colonies in the Americas. In 1802 35 battalions landed on Saint-Domingue under Charles Victoire Emmanuel Leclerc, seven battalions on Guadeloupe under général de division Richepance and six on Martinique under admiral Louis Thomas Villaret de Joyeuse. Richepance and his force landed on 6 May that year. He treated the colonial troops harshly and local military leaders divided into two factions - one led by Pélage submitted to Richepance's authority and the other sided with chefs de bataillon Delgrès and Joseph Ignace in open rebellion from 10 May 1802. Pélage sent envoys to Delgrès but he replied:

If Pélage is free, it is because he has sold us; this is he did not suffer the odious treatment that was inflicted on our brothers in arms at Pointe-à-Pitre. They were disarmed, stripped naked, beaten, and put in irons on board the frigates. Should they have expected so many outrages... Pélage must be a coward to have lent himself to such horrors.

Troops from mainland France began to fight troops from the Antilles whilst troops from the Antilles also fought amongst themselves. Richepance order Pélage to supply 600 black reinforcements. These battles resulted in Ignace's death on 26 May and Delgrès' two days later, Richepance's victory (though he died of yellow fever on 2 September) and the execution or sale of black troops captured by the Republican loyalists. On 16 July Napoleon re-established slavery in the French colonies and it was maintained on Martinique by the Law of 20 May 1802.

More sporadic battles continued into late 1802 and 1803, with rebel groups taking refuge in the forest of Basse-Terre and on the slopes of Soufrière, mixing with bands of maroons.

=== End of his career ===
The forty-two surviving leaders of the 1801 rebellion, including Pélage, thirty other officers and Pélage's household (his wife, mother-in-law, nephew and a servant), were sent to France. They embarked on the Le Fougueux on 29 June 1802 and arrived at Brest on 18 August. This saved them from Lacrosse's revenge when he again became governor.

The prisons in Brest were full and so the whole group was initially placed in the hôpital Saint-Louis in the two, then the main leaders (Pélage and the other members of the Provisional Government Council) were sent to prison in Paris. There they edited and published a justification entitled Memorial for chef de brigade Magloire Pélage and for the inhabitants of Guadeloupe, heavily blaming Lacrosse and holding Ignace responsible for the 1801 rebellion, as well as a letter to the First Consul. Pélage benefitted from a favourable letter from de Rochambeau, who had succeeded Leclerc as commander of the Saint-Domingue expedition. The group was freed by order of the Seine criminal tribunal on 23 November 1803.

Pélage and his family lived in retirement on his pension in Paris. He made several requests to rejoin the army and this was finally granted in 1808 with the rank of colonel. He was sent to the Peninsular War in October that year as an 'adjudant-commandant' on the staff, dying in Estella on 17 April 1810. On 30 July 1810 his widow and three young children were granted a life annuity, which she drew on until 1826.

== Bibliography (in French) ==
- de Frasans, Hippolyte (1803). Mémoire pour le chef de brigade Magloire Pélage, et pour les habitants de la Guadeloupe chargés par cette colonie de l'administration provisoire, après le départ du capitaine général Lacrosse, dans le mois de brumaire an X. Paris: librairie Victor Desenne. :
  - Volume 1 : https://archive.org/details/MemoireforPelageGpeanAout1803t1/page/n5/mode/2up ;
  - Volume 2 : https://books.google.fr/books?id=sL1xVS2fuBwC
- G. Hardy, 'La Révolution française aux colonies : l'affaire Pélage à la Guadeloupe', Annales historiques de la Révolution française, vol. VI, no 35, 1929, pp. 447–464.
- Nègre, André (1987). La rébellion de la Guadeloupe: Guadeloupe contre Consulat, 1801-1802. Paris: Editions Caribéennes..
- Huyghues-Belrose, Vincent (December 2005). "Magloire Pélage à la Lunette Bouillé (Martinique, 1794)". Études caribéennes (3).
