= Travailleur socialiste =

- Type: Weekly
- Founded: 1934
- Political alignment: Socialist
- Language: French language
- Headquarters: Pointe-à-Pitre

Travailleur socialiste ('Socialist Worker') was a French language weekly newspaper published from Pointe-à-Pitre, Guadeloupe. Travailleur socialiste was founded in 1934. It was an organ of SFIO. As of 1937, Paul Valentin was the political director of the publication.
