= Matouba =

Coordinates: 16°02′N 61°41′W

Matouba is a locality in the commune of Saint-Claude in Guadeloupe. It is the place of death of Louis Delgrès. It is noted for its natural spring, 742 meters above sea level within the Guadeloupe National Park, which is said to have "miraculous" powers. Matouba is used as a base for hiking. It contains the chapelle du Vœu-de-Matouba.
