= Pointe-à-Pitre =

Subprefecture, commune, and the center of the largest metropolitan area in Guadeloupe

Pointe-à-Pitre Pwentapit / Lapwent (Guadeloupean Creole French)
- Subprefecture and commune
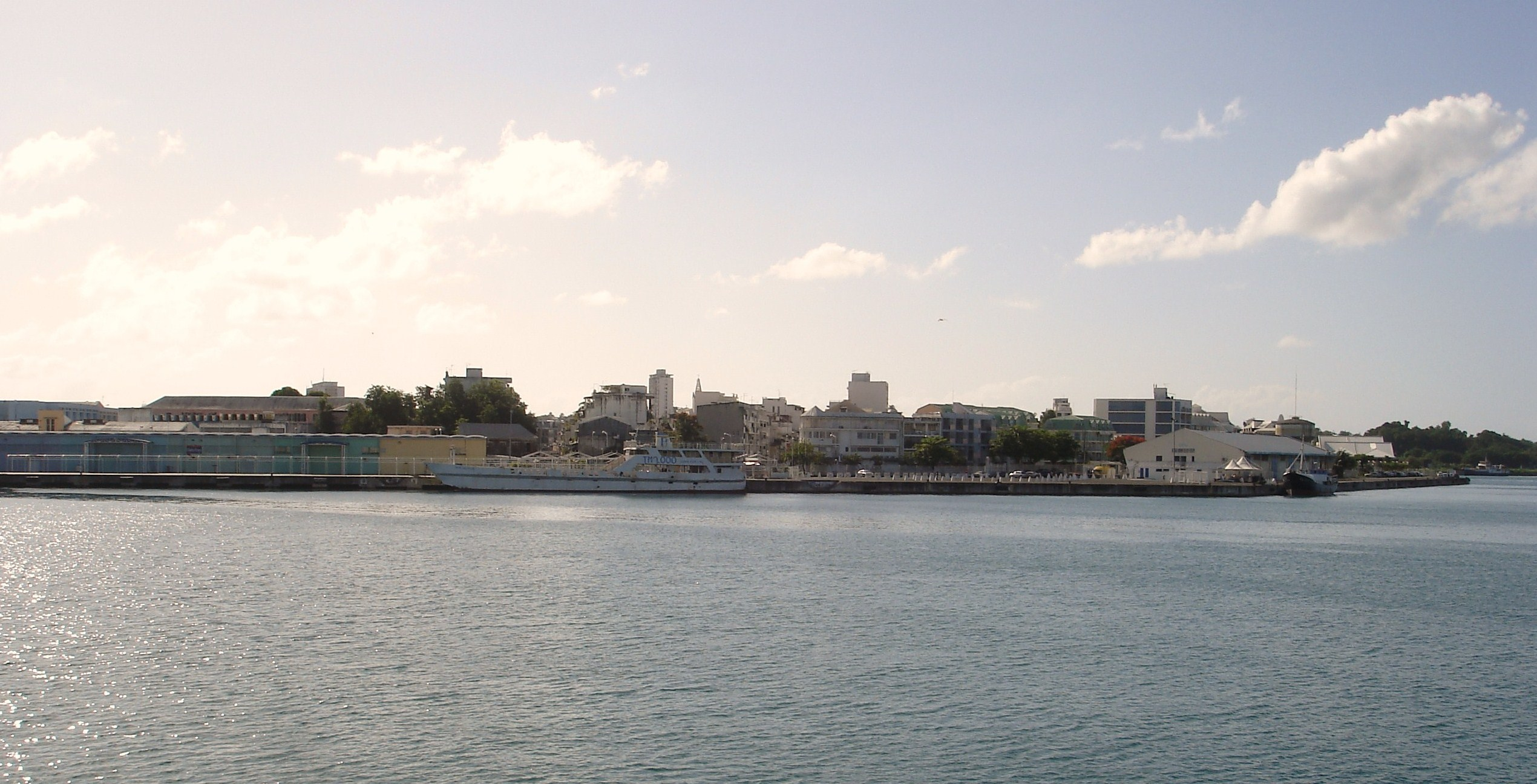
- A view of Pointe-à-Pitre, from the seaport

- Coat of arms

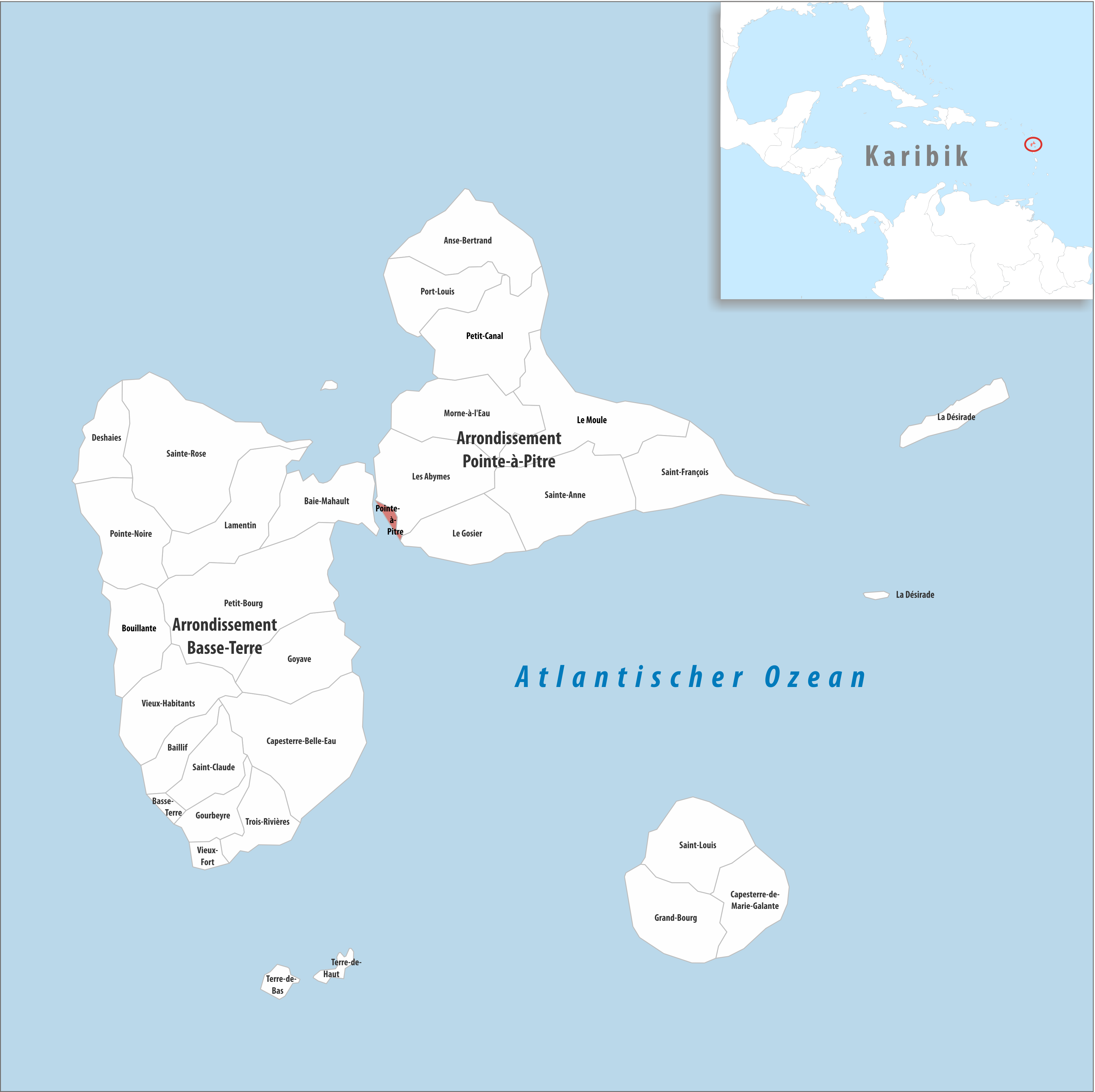
- Location of the commune (in red) within Guadeloupe
- Location of Pointe-à-Pitre
- Coordinates: 16°14′28″N 61°31′59″W
- Country: France
- Overseas region and department: Guadeloupe
- Arrondissement: Pointe-à-Pitre
- Canton: Pointe-à-Pitre
- Intercommunality: CAP Excellence

Government
  - Mayor (2020–2026): Harry Durimel
- Area^{1}: 2.66 km^{2} (1.03 sq mi)
  - Urban: 729.7 km^{2} (281.7 sq mi)
- Population (2023): 15,040
  - Density: 5,650/km^{2} (14,600/sq mi)
  - Urban (2018): 250,952
  - Urban density: 343.9/km^{2} (890.7/sq mi)
- Time zone: UTC−04:00 (AST)
- INSEE/Postal code: 97120 /97110
- ^{1} French Land Register data, which excludes lakes, ponds, glaciers > 1 km^{2} (0.386 sq mi or 247 acres) and river estuaries.

Pointe-à-Pitre (French pronunciation: [pwɛ̃tapitʁ]; Guadeloupean Creole: Pwentapit, [pwɛ̃tapit], or simply Lapwent, [lapwɛ̃t]) is the second most populous commune of Guadeloupe (after Les Abymes). Guadeloupe is an overseas region and department of France located in the Lesser Antilles, of which it is a sous-préfecture, being the seat of the arrondissement of Pointe-à-Pitre.

Although Pointe-à-Pitre is not Guadeloupe's administrative capital (that distinction goes to Basse-Terre), it is nonetheless the region's economic capital. The inhabitants are called "Pointois". In 2022, it had a population of 14,855 in the city (commune) of Pointe-à-Pitre proper and 252,132 inhabitants in the urban unit Pointe-à-Pitre–Les Abymes. It is part of the metropolitan area of Les Abymes.

Pointe-à-Pitre International Airport, Guadeloupe's main international airport, is located 3 km (1.9 mi) north of downtown Pointe-à-Pitre in the commune of Les Abymes.

The current mayor of Pointe-à-Pitre is Harry Durimel.

== Geography ==
Pointe-à-Pitre is situated on the southwest portion of the island of Grande-Terre, facing the Caribbean Sea; it lies in the centre of Guadeloupe, and is near the Rivière Salée ("Salt River"), which separates Grande-Terre from Basse-Terre Island. The town of Pointe-à-Pitre is surrounded by the communes of Les Abymes, Baie-Mahault and Le Gosier. Pointe-à-Pitre is on a limestone plateau, which was a factor for the construction of the city. The bay, Petit Cul-de-Sac Marin, offers a sheltered port.

== Name ==
The name Pointe-à-Pitre, literally the "headland of Pitre", is popularly believed to derive from a Dutch sailor/fisherman called "Pieter", who may have settled in the 17th century on a promontory facing the Îlet à Cochon ("Hogs Islet"), just to the south of today's downtown Pointe-à-Pitre. The promontory came to be called "Pointe-à-Pieter" (the "headland of Peter") and later "Pointe-à-Pitre". However, this theory is now questioned by linguists, with a derivation from the Spanish word "pitera", meaning a type of rope made from agave, suggested as the true etymon of "pitre".

== History ==
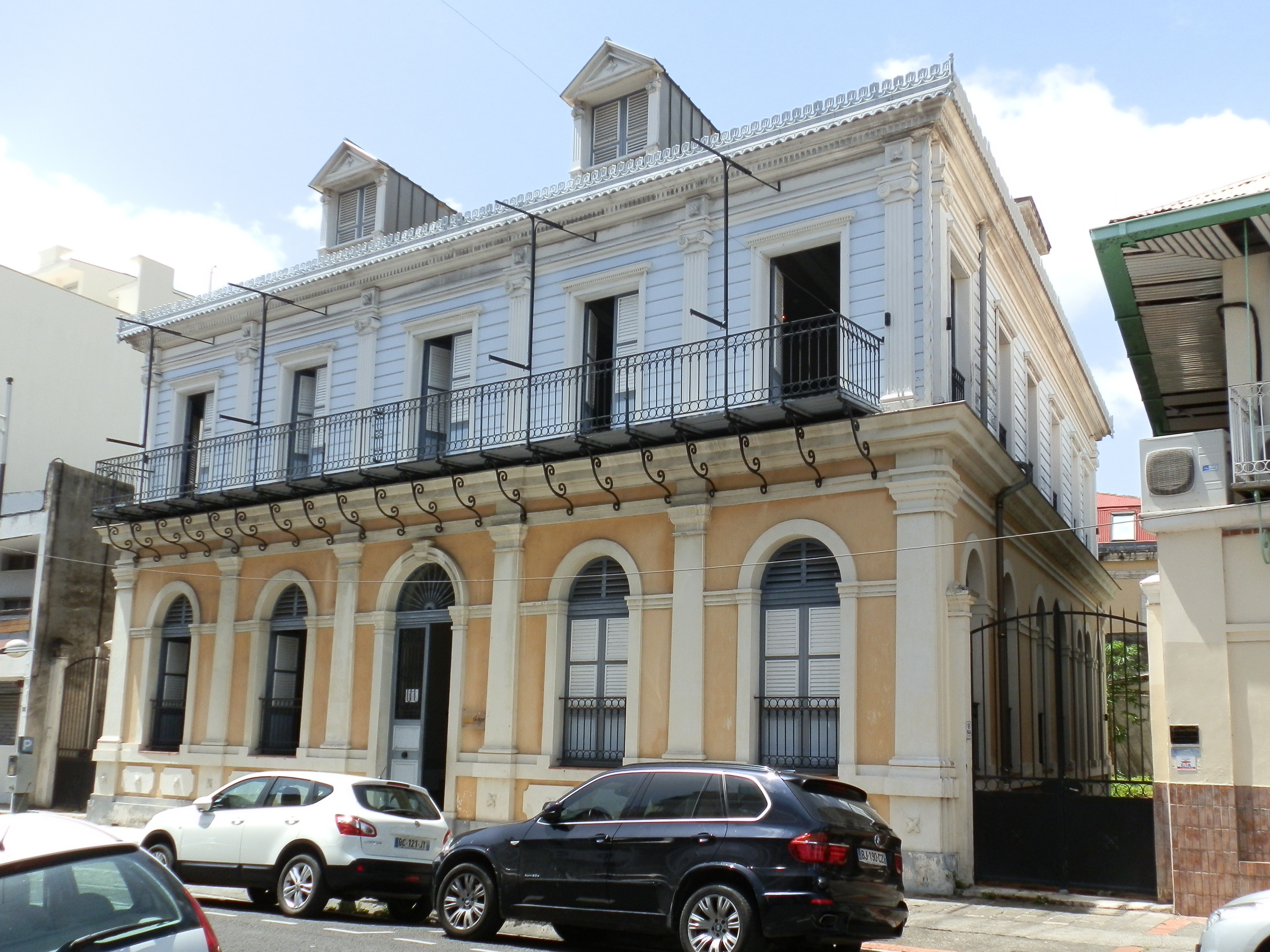
Former town hall of Pointe-à-Pitre

French colonial authorities had long thought about establishing a city on the current location of Pointe-à-Pitre, at the junction of Guadeloupe's two main 'island' districts (Basse-Terre Island and Grande Terre), but several attempts around 1713-1730 failed due to the insalubrious swampy ground.

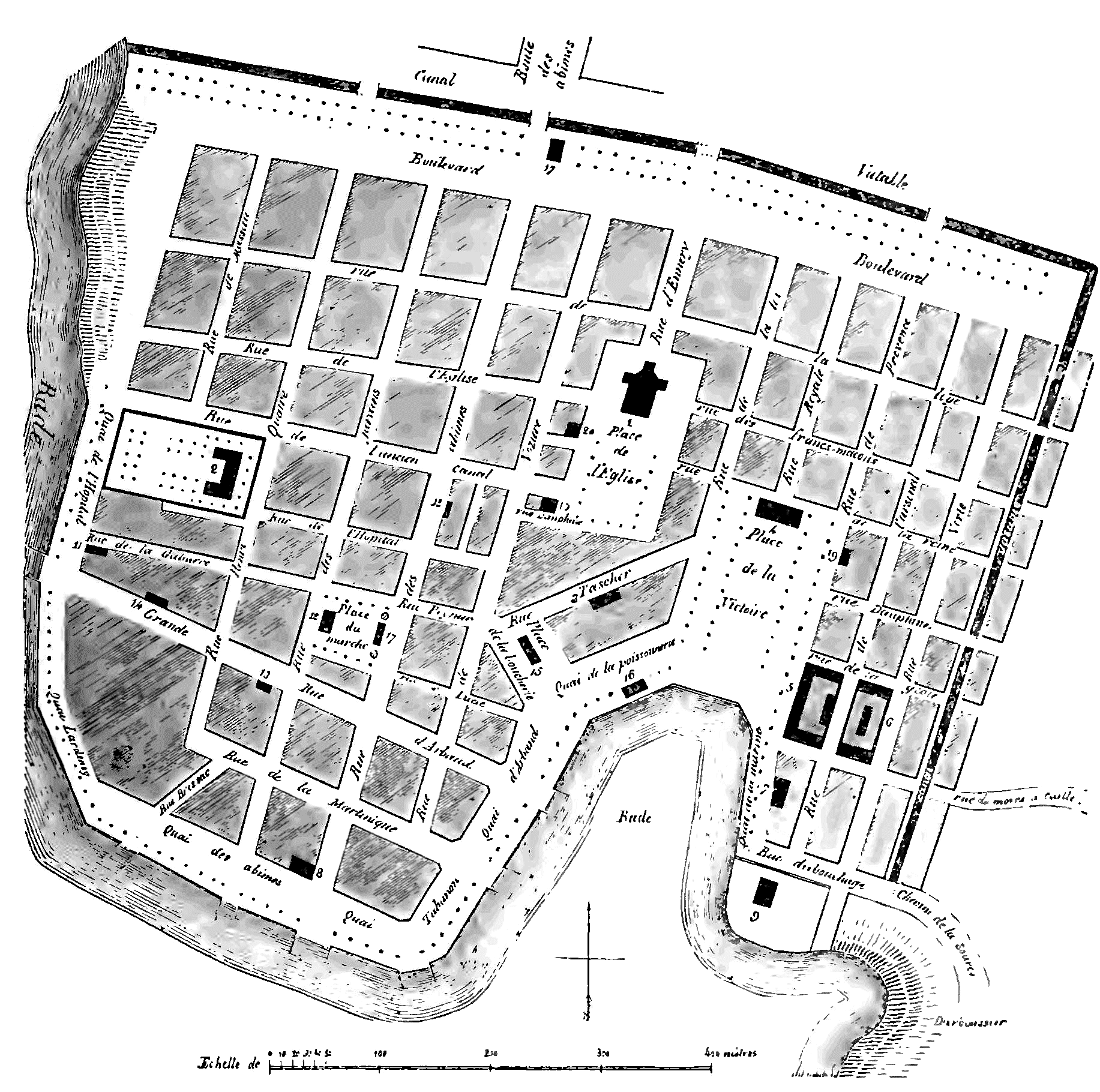
Plan of Pointe-à-Pitre (1843)

During the British occupation of Guadeloupe (1759–1763) a settlement appeared on a hill overlooking the swamps. After the return of Guadeloupe to France in 1763, the city of Pointe-à-Pitre was officially founded under governor Gabriel de Clieu in 1764 by royal edict, and the swamps where downtown Pointe-à-Pitre stands today were drained in the following years, thus allowing the urban development of the city.

The development of the city was relatively rapid, partly thanks to the corsairs. In 1780, however, a great fire entirely destroyed the city. Sixty-three years later, in 1843, it was again destroyed by an earthquake. The history of Pointe-à-Pitre is marked by many disasters: the fires of 1850, 1871 and 1931, the earthquakes of 1851 and 1897 and the hurricanes of 1865 and 1928. The city also experienced several epidemics of cholera. Its location and large sheltered port have nonetheless allowed Pointe-à-Pitre to become Guadeloupe's largest city and economic capital.

Further information: Travailleur socialiste

== Population ==
Historical population
Year	Pop.	±% p.a.
1967	29,522	—
1974	23,889	−2.98%
1982	25,310	+0.72%
1990	26,029	+0.35%
1999	20,948	−2.38%
2007	17,408	−2.29%
2012	15,598	−2.17%
2017	15,923	+0.41%
2023	15,040	−0.95%
Source: INSEE

== Religion ==
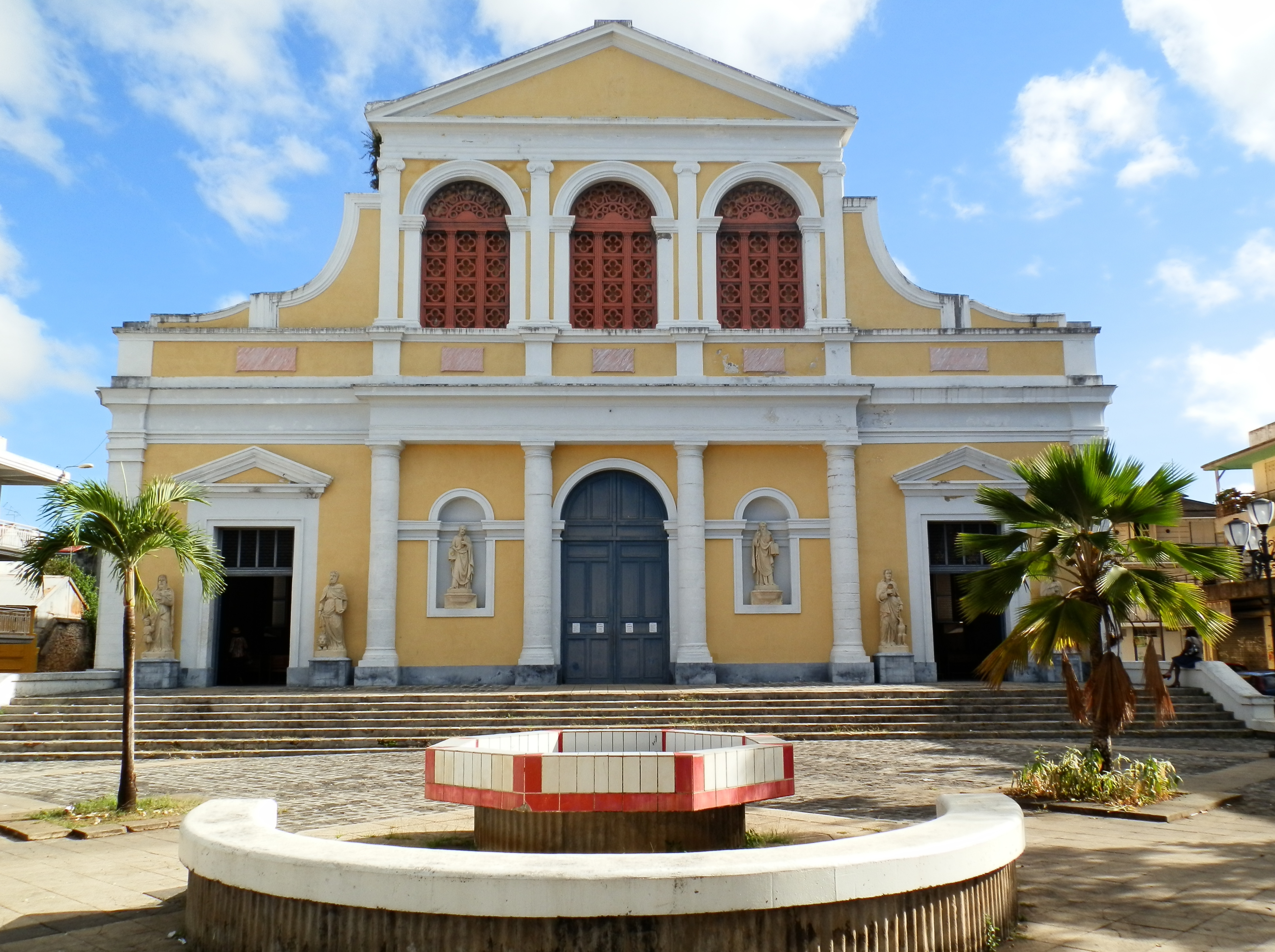
St Peter and Paul cathedral

The former cathedral of St. Peter and Paul, Ancienne cathédrale Saint-Pierre-et-Saint-Paul, testifies that Pointe-à-Pitre has been the episcopal seat of a Roman Catholic Diocese of Pointe-à-Pitre on Grande-Terre. This was united with the present diocese for all Guadeloupe, at Basse-Terre, in 1951, since when its full title has been Roman Catholic Diocese of Basse-Terre-Pointe-à-Pitre.

== Climate ==
On the Köppen climate classification, Pointe-à-Pitre is on the border between tropical monsoon climate (Am) and tropical rainforest climate (Af). Like any other Eastern Caribbean city, it experiences rainfall quite evenly spread during the year, with a wetter season between July and November which coincides with the hurricane season. The city receives 1500–2000 mm of rainfall annually. Tropical heat is the norm, bringing steady highs of around 32 °C (89 °F) that drop to 20 °C (68 °F) at night.

Climate data for Abymes adjacent to Pointe-à-Pitre (Le Raizet Airport) 1981–2010 averages, extremes 1950–present
Month	Jan	Feb	Mar	Apr	May	Jun	Jul	Aug	Sep	Oct	Nov	Dec	Year
Record high °C (°F)	31.8 (89.2)	32.1 (89.8)	32.8 (91.0)	33.3 (91.9)	33.3 (91.9)	33.4 (92.1)	34.2 (93.6)	34.2 (93.6)	34.1 (93.4)	34.1 (93.4)	33.4 (92.1)	32.4 (90.3)	34.2 (93.6)
Mean daily maximum °C (°F)	29.2 (84.6)	29.2 (84.6)	29.7 (85.5)	30.3 (86.5)	30.9 (87.6)	31.4 (88.5)	31.6 (88.9)	31.9 (89.4)	31.7 (89.1)	31.3 (88.3)	30.5 (86.9)	29.7 (85.5)	30.6 (87.1)
Daily mean °C (°F)	24.9 (76.8)	24.9 (76.8)	25.3 (77.5)	26.3 (79.3)	27.2 (81.0)	27.9 (82.2)	28.0 (82.4)	28.0 (82.4)	27.8 (82.0)	27.3 (81.1)	26.5 (79.7)	25.5 (77.9)	26.6 (79.9)
Mean daily minimum °C (°F)	20.7 (69.3)	20.6 (69.1)	21.0 (69.8)	22.2 (72.0)	23.6 (74.5)	24.3 (75.7)	24.3 (75.7)	24.1 (75.4)	23.8 (74.8)	23.3 (73.9)	22.4 (72.3)	21.3 (70.3)	22.6 (72.7)
Record low °C (°F)	13.5 (56.3)	13.0 (55.4)	13.9 (57.0)	15.8 (60.4)	16.4 (61.5)	18.9 (66.0)	19.6 (67.3)	19.8 (67.6)	19.5 (67.1)	19.0 (66.2)	16.8 (62.2)	14.4 (57.9)	13.0 (55.4)
Average precipitation mm (inches)	83.0 (3.27)	60.0 (2.36)	67.9 (2.67)	96.5 (3.80)	134.1 (5.28)	107.8 (4.24)	129.6 (5.10)	169.1 (6.66)	206.2 (8.12)	214.5 (8.44)	213.9 (8.42)	134.0 (5.28)	1,616.6 (63.65)
Average precipitation days (≥ 1.0 mm)	15.83	12.30	11.10	10.73	13.07	13.20	15.20	16.43	16.27	17.50	17.40	16.47	175.50
Mean monthly sunshine hours	192.4	182.7	217.5	211.4	212.7	206.5	198.3	221.5	200.6	181.7	181.4	189.1	2,395.7
Source: Meteo France

The trade winds blow from the northeast and often temper the climate.

== Urban area and demographics ==
The tiny commune (municipality) of Pointe-à-Pitre is the center of a larger urban area covering 11 communes. This urban area – with 250,952 inhabitants at the 2018 census, representing 65% of the population – is the largest in Guadeloupe and one of the largest among French Overseas territories and departments.

=== Communes ===
The eleven communes making up the urban area of Pointe-à-Pitre, with their populations in 2017, are:

- Les Abymes: 53,491 (Les Abymes being the most populated commune in the urban area and indeed in Guadeloupe, the urban area of Pointe-à-Pitre is also often called the "Pointe-à-Pitre-Les Abymes" urban area)
- Baie-Mahault: 30,929 (the location of the urban area's main seaport and largest industrial park in the Lesser Antilles)
- Le Gosier: 26,783
- Petit-Bourg: 24,277
- Sainte-Anne: 23,675
- Le Moule: 22,150
- Morne-à-l'Eau: 17,434
- Lamentin: 16,573
- Pointe-à-Pitre: 15,923 (the historic, commercial and administrative heart of the urban area; facing competition from its suburbs, the congested commune of Pointe-à-Pitre has been losing businesses and inhabitants in the past years)
- Saint-François: 12,816
- Petit-Canal: 8,220

== Economy ==
The city is the commercial capital of Guadeloupe, serving as the main port of call for cargo and passengers alike. The main seaport is the Port de Jarry located across the Bay of Cul-de-Sac Marin in the commune (municipality) of Baie-Mahault. It has one of the biggest container terminals in the Eastern Caribbean with a quay 600m long. The main exports are food crops (bananas, cocoa, coffee and sugar), animal products (beef, milk, yogurt) and manufactured goods (refined petroleum, textiles and medicines). The extensive Zone Industrielle de Jarry, directly west of Pointe-à-Pitre is a major centre of commercial and light industrial activity, notably for warehousing and distribution. Agricultural production continues in the east of the area where cattle rearing, banana and sugarcane growing continues. The nearby suburb of Le Gosier is Guadeloupe's main seaside resort.

Seventy percent of residents of Pointe-à-Pitre resided in subsidized public housing in 2009.

== Notable people ==
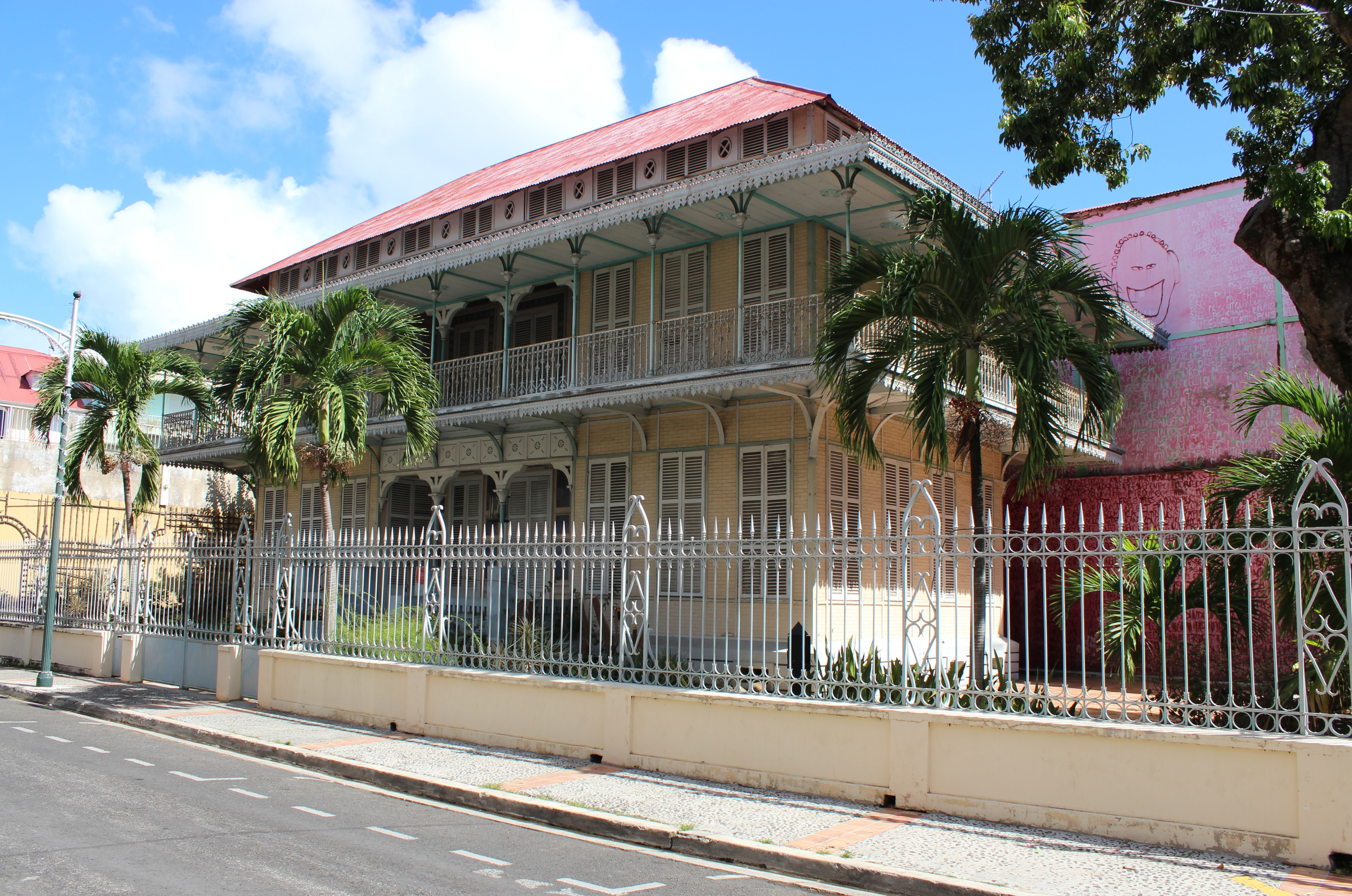
Saint-John Perse Museum.

- Gilles Bloch - physician-scientist, former president of Inserm
- Maryse Condé - writer
- Saint-John Perse
- Francky Vincent
- Rodrigue Beaubois - NBA Dallas Mavericks player
- Roch-Ambroise Auguste Bébian
- Charles Lanrezac, WW1 General, Commander of the 5th French Army, Grand Cross of the Légion d'Honneur
- Jean-Marc Mormeck, boxer
- Auguste Plée
- Firmine Richard
- Jacques Schwarz-Bart
- Louis-Gaston de Sonis - French Army officer
- Lilian Thuram - former Juventus and FC Barcelona association football player. Won 142 caps for France and the 1998 FIFA World Cup.
- Stéphane Zubar - AFC Bournemouth player
- Laura Flessel-Colovic - 5-time Olympic medalist in épée fencing
- Patricia Girard - 1996 Olympic Games silver medalist in 100m hurdles
- Thierry Henry
- Clotilde Armand - Romanian politician
- Babette de Rozières, TV chef and politician
- Angela Aquereburu, screenwriter, film producer and film director
- Teddy Riner - 5-time Olympic gold medalist judoka

== Education ==
Public preschools in Pointe-à-Pitre commune include:

- Ecole maternelle Raymonde Bambuck
- Ecole maternelle Bébian
- Ecole maternelle Salvator Cidemé
- Ecole maternelle Dubouchage
- Ecole maternelle Bonchamps Fernande
- Ecole maternelle Rallion Frantz
- Ecole maternelle Raphael Jolivière 2
- Ecole maternelle Lauricisque

Public primary schools in Pointe-à-Pitre commune include:

- Ecole primaire Raymonde Bambuck
- Ecole primaire Salvator Cidemé
- Ecole primaire Raphael Cipolin
- Ecole primaire Léon Feix
- Ecole primaire Amédée Fengarol 1
- Ecole primaire Amédée Fengarol 2
- Ecole primaire Bonchamps Fernande
- Ecole primaire Lauricisque

Elementary schools include:

- Ecole élémentaire Raphael Jolivière 1

Public junior high schools in Pointe-à-Pitre commune include:

- Collège Jules Michelet
- Collège Sadi Carnot
- Collège Nestor De Kermadec
- Collège Front de mer

Public senior high schools in Pointe-à-Pitre commune include:

- LPO Carnot (including the Micro Lycée)

Private preschools and primary schools in Pointe-à-Pitre commune include:

- Ecole maternelle privée Notre-Dame du Sacré-Coeur
- Ecole primaire privée Saint Joseph de Clun

Private secondary schools under contract in Pointe-à-Pitre commune:

- LP Boc Calmet
- Collège/LGT Massabielle

== Monuments ==
- Place de la Victoire
- La rue Frébault, marché aux Épices (classé MH)
- The musée Saint-John-Perse (classé MH)
- The musée Schœlcher (classé MH)
- The Pavillon L'Herminier (classé MH)
- The Mémorial ACTe
- The église Saint-Pierre-et-Saint-Paul (classée MH)
- The church of Massabielle.
- Various elements of the civil and religious heritage of the municipality were built by the architect Ali Tur between 1930 and 1935 in a major works initiative by various institutions after the 1928 Okeechobee hurricane. He realized the palais de justice de Pointe-à-Pitre, the hospice hospital on the island, the fish hall, several schools, and the fire station.
- The statues of La Mulâtresse Solitude, Colonel Louis Delgrès, Colonel Joseph Ignace, percussionist Marcel Lollia (popularly known as "Vélo") and the painting of Émeutes de mai 1967 en Guadeloupe
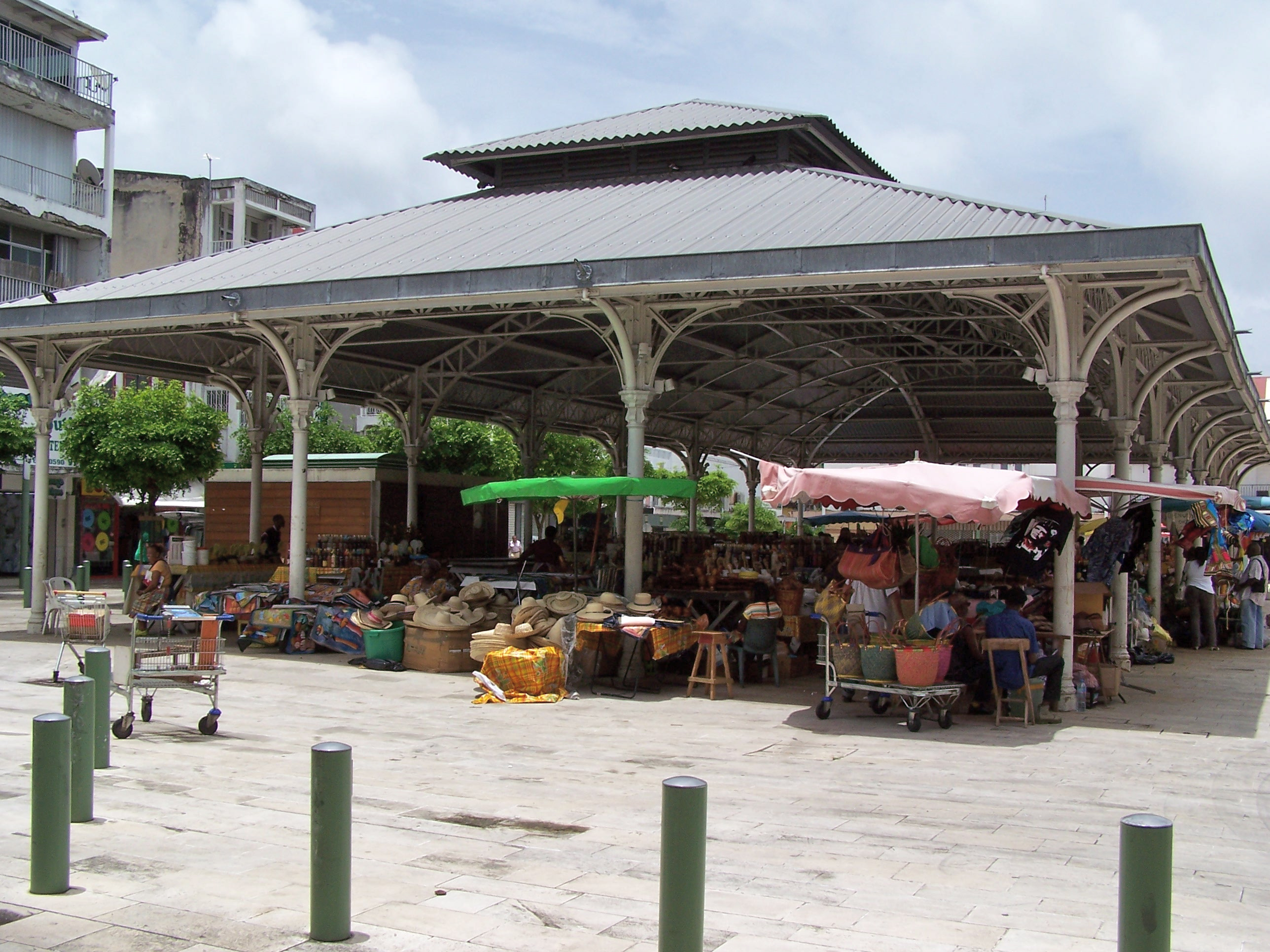
Le marché aux Épices.

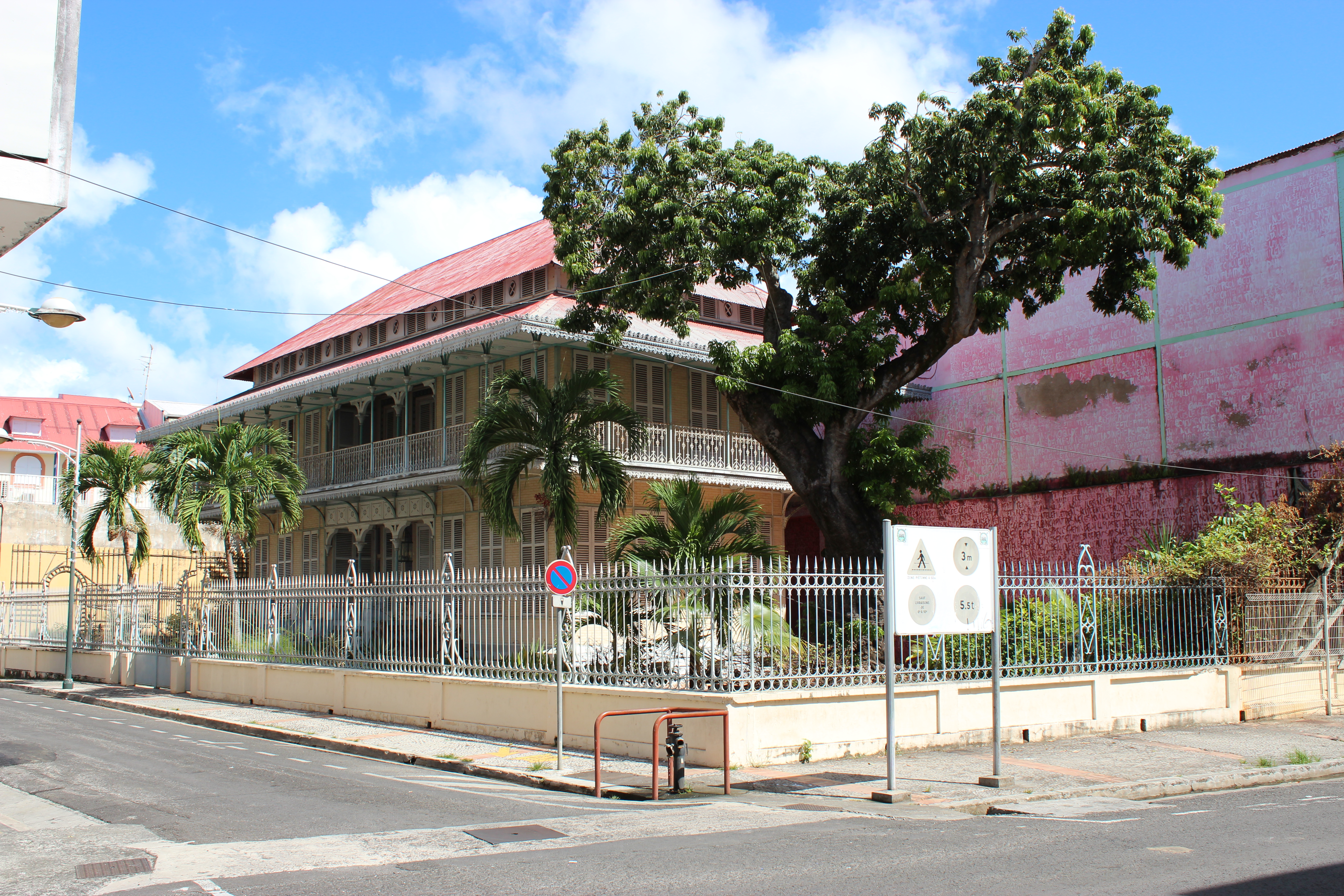
Musée Saint-John-Perse.

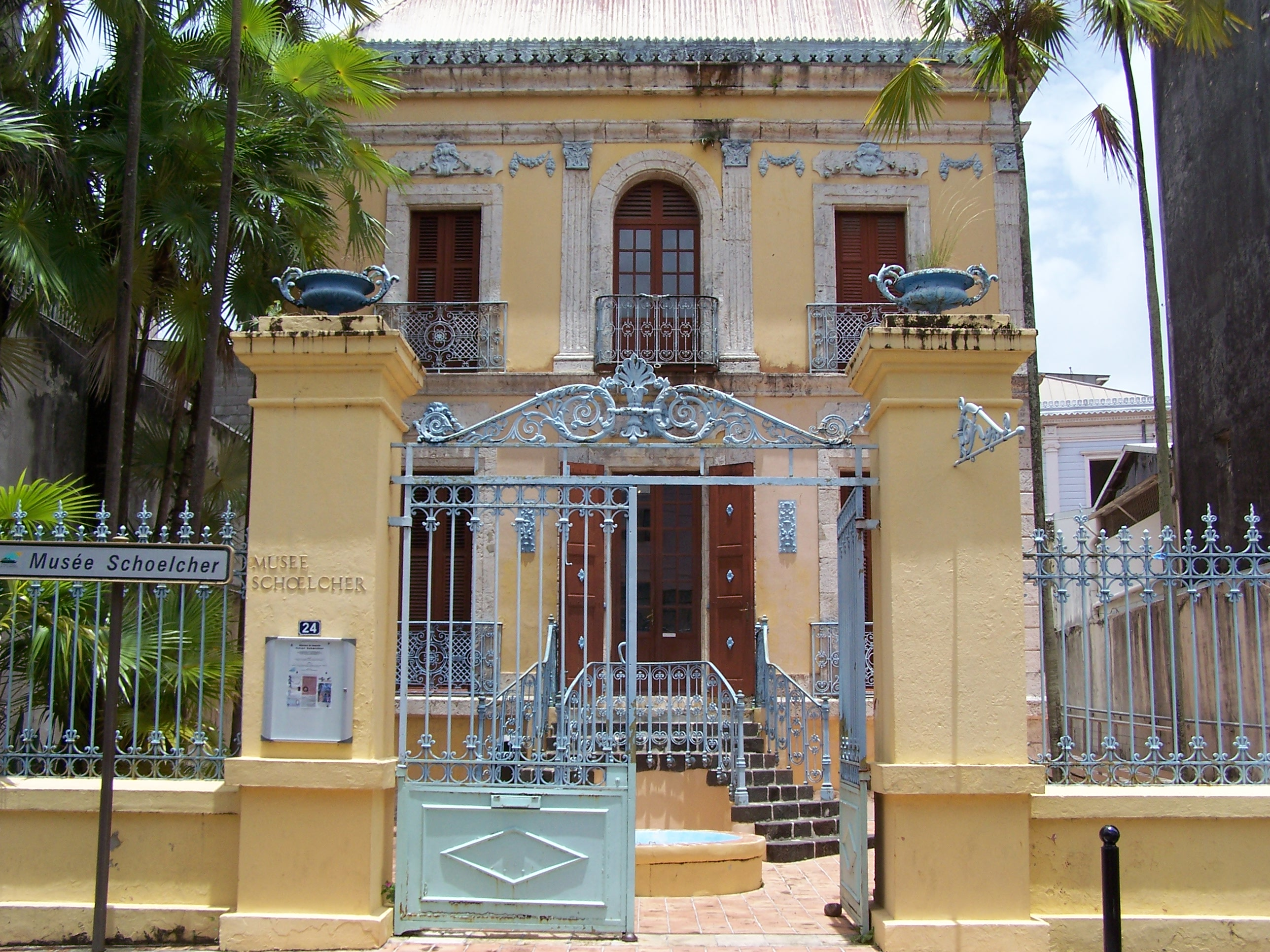
Musée Schœlcher.

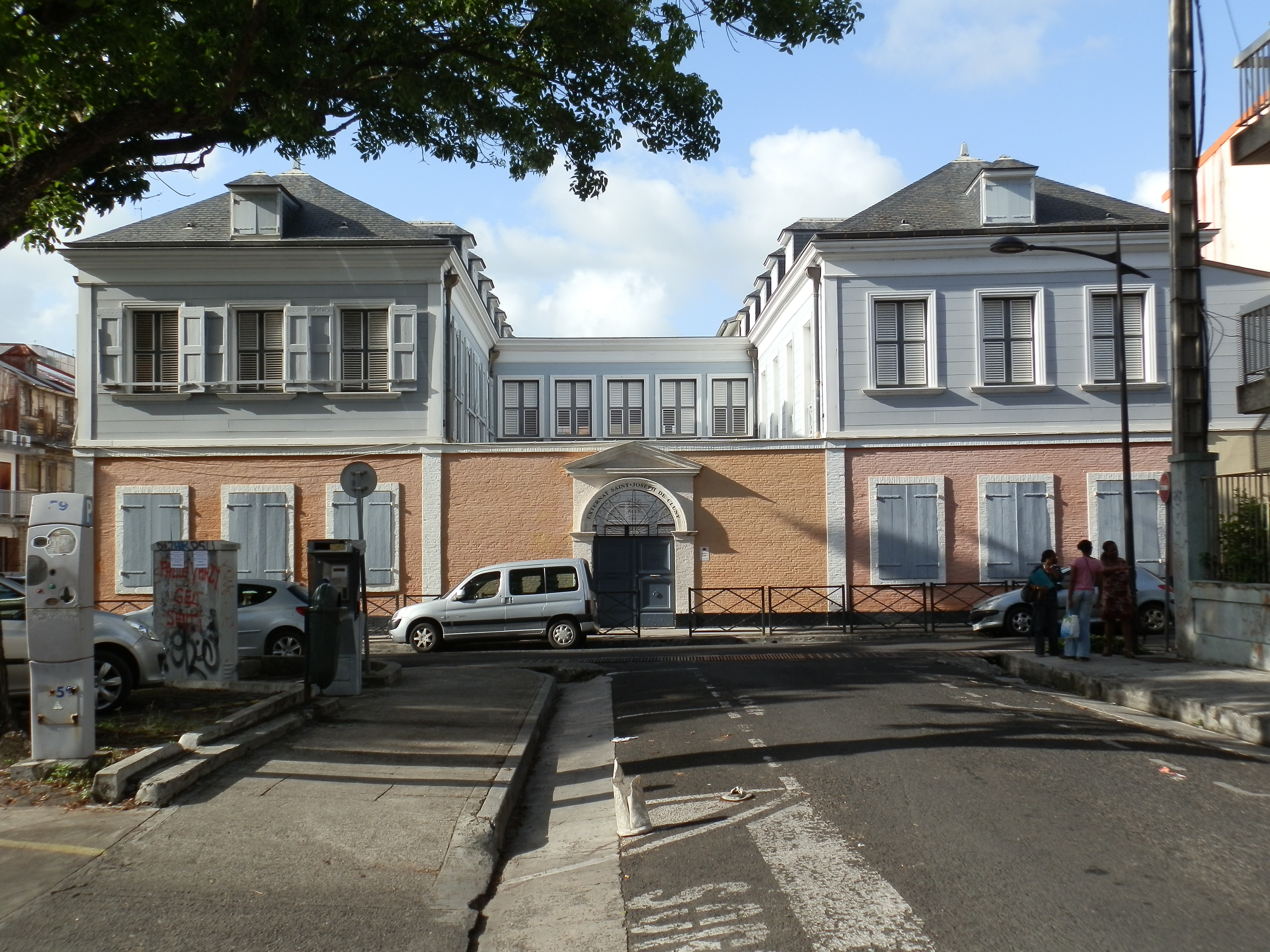

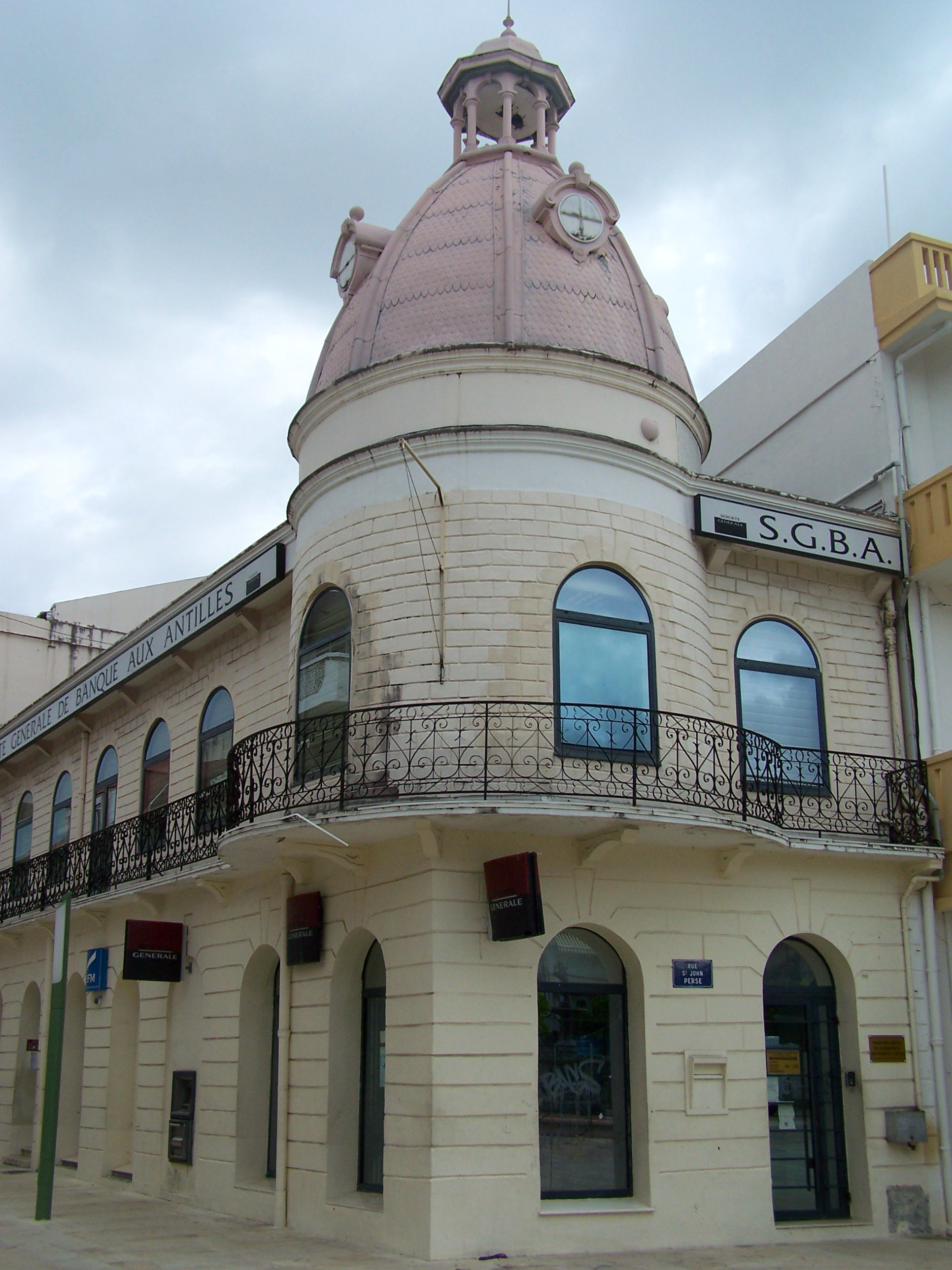

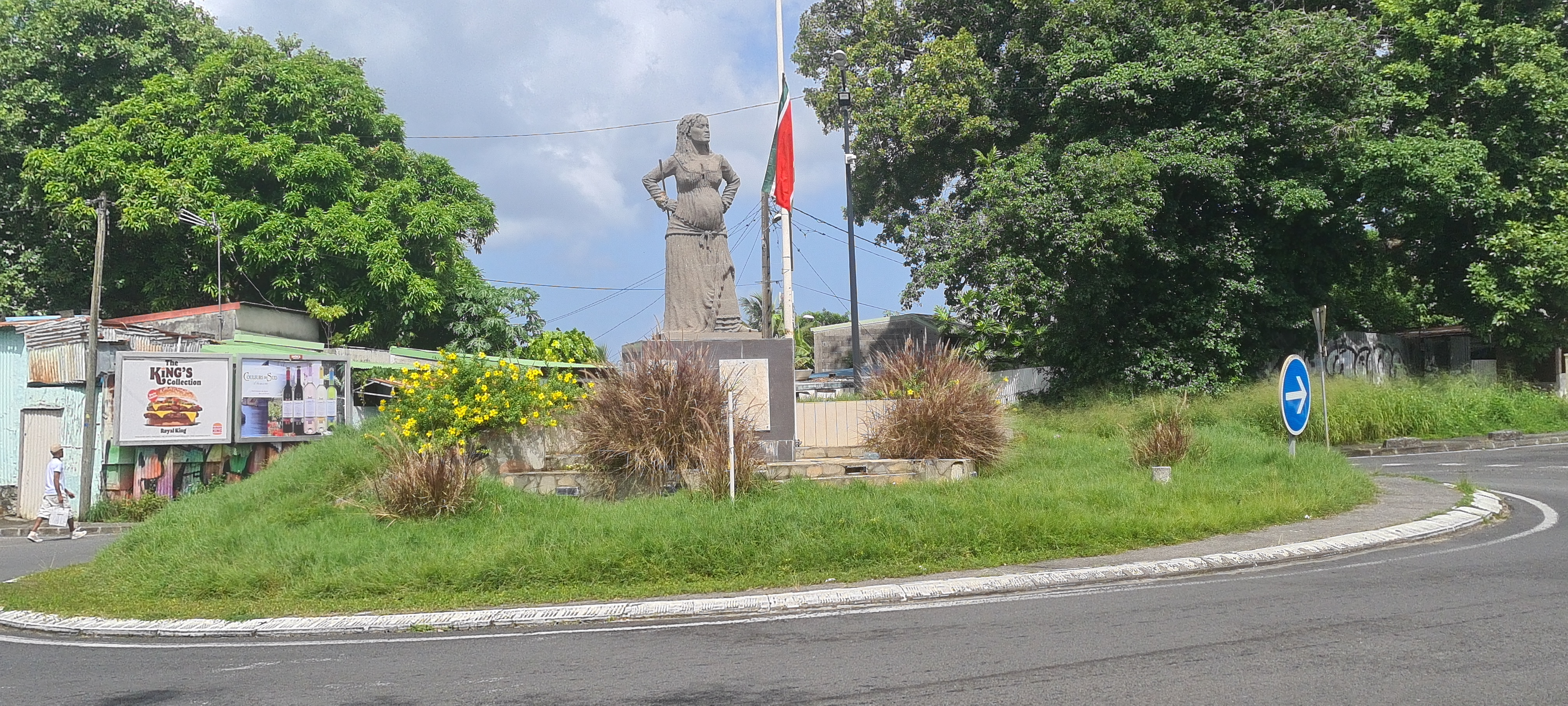
La Mulâtresse Solitude, in Les Abymes.
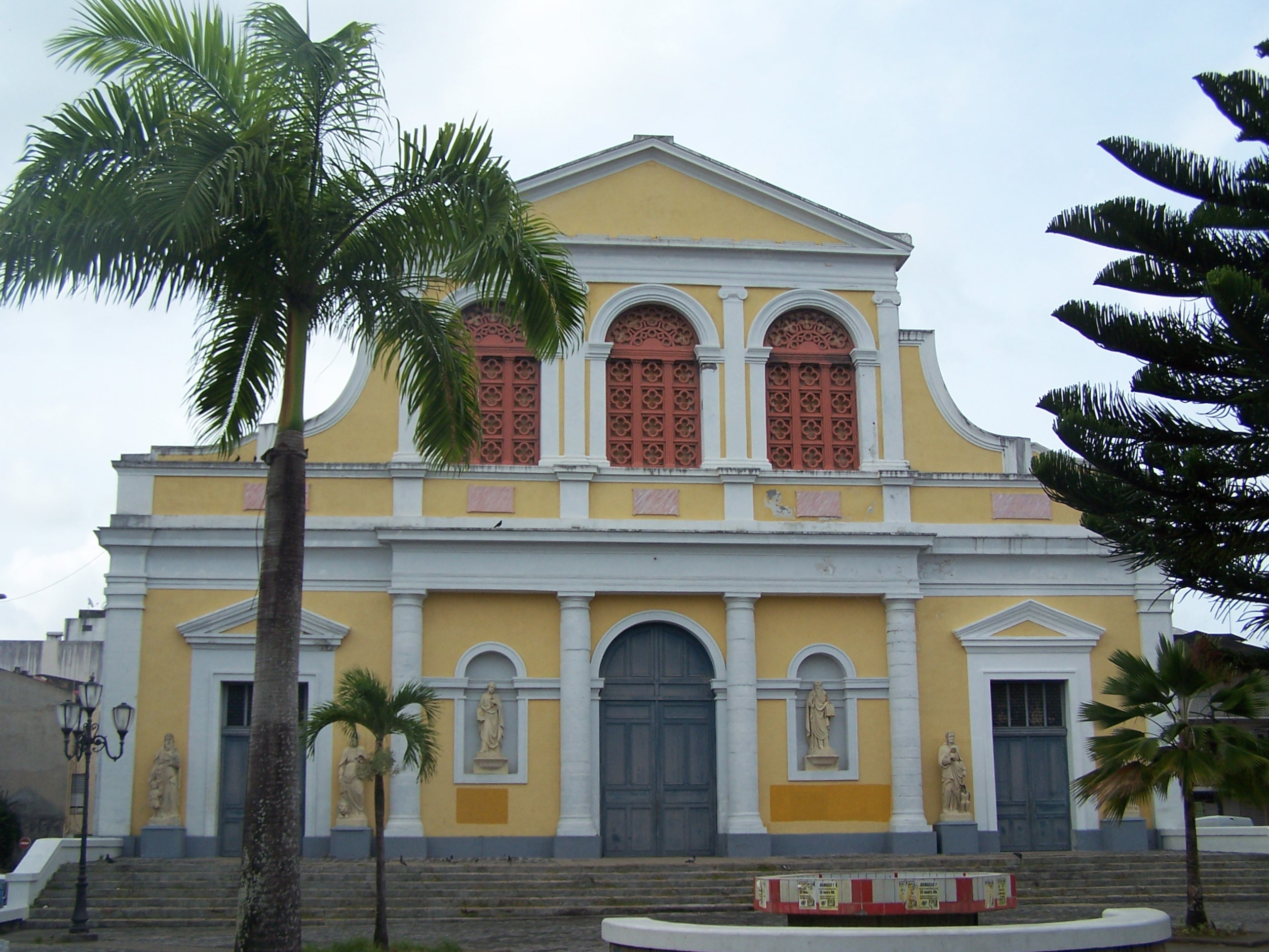
Église Saint-Pierre-et-Saint-Paul.

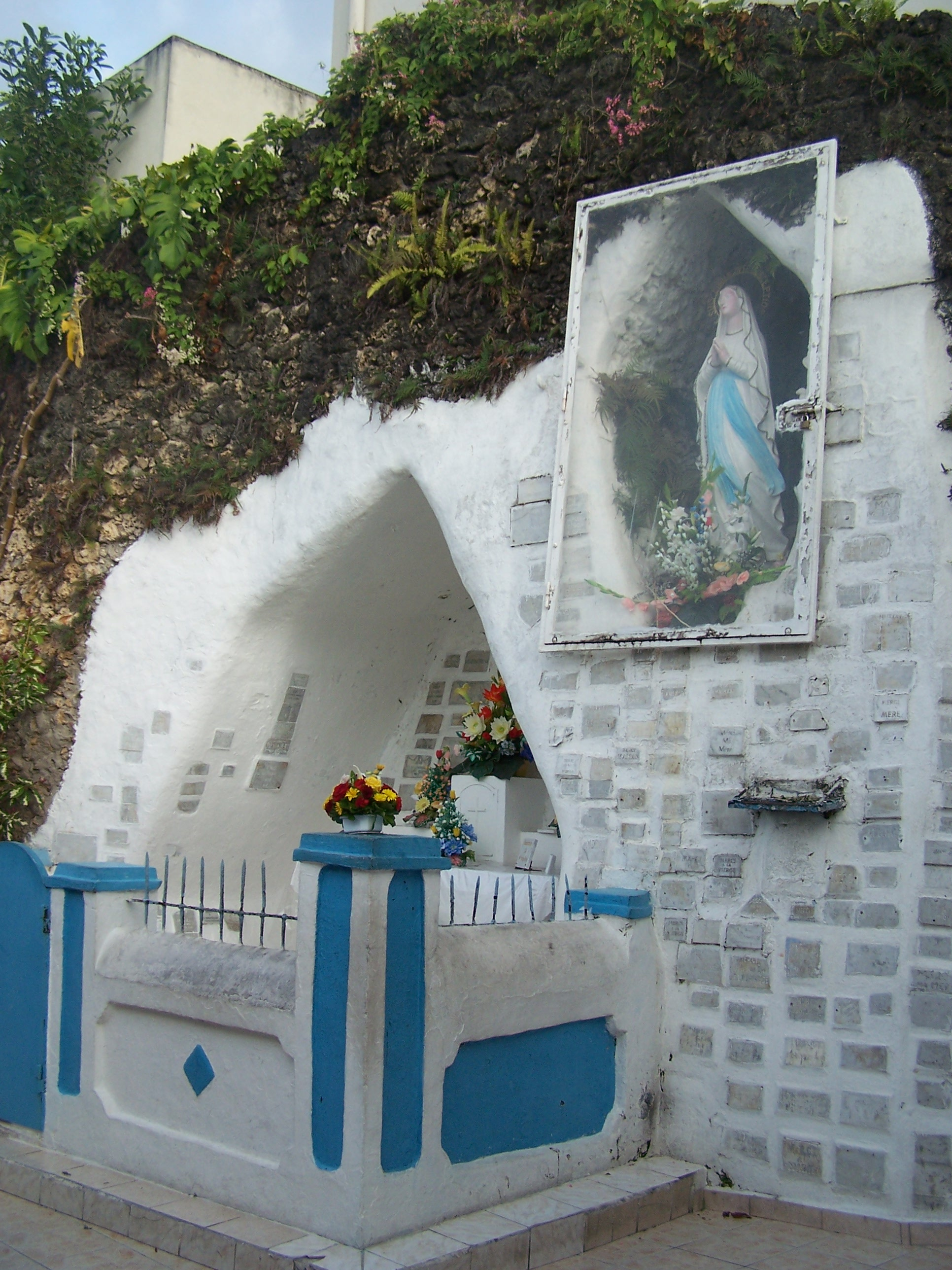
La grotte de Massabielle.

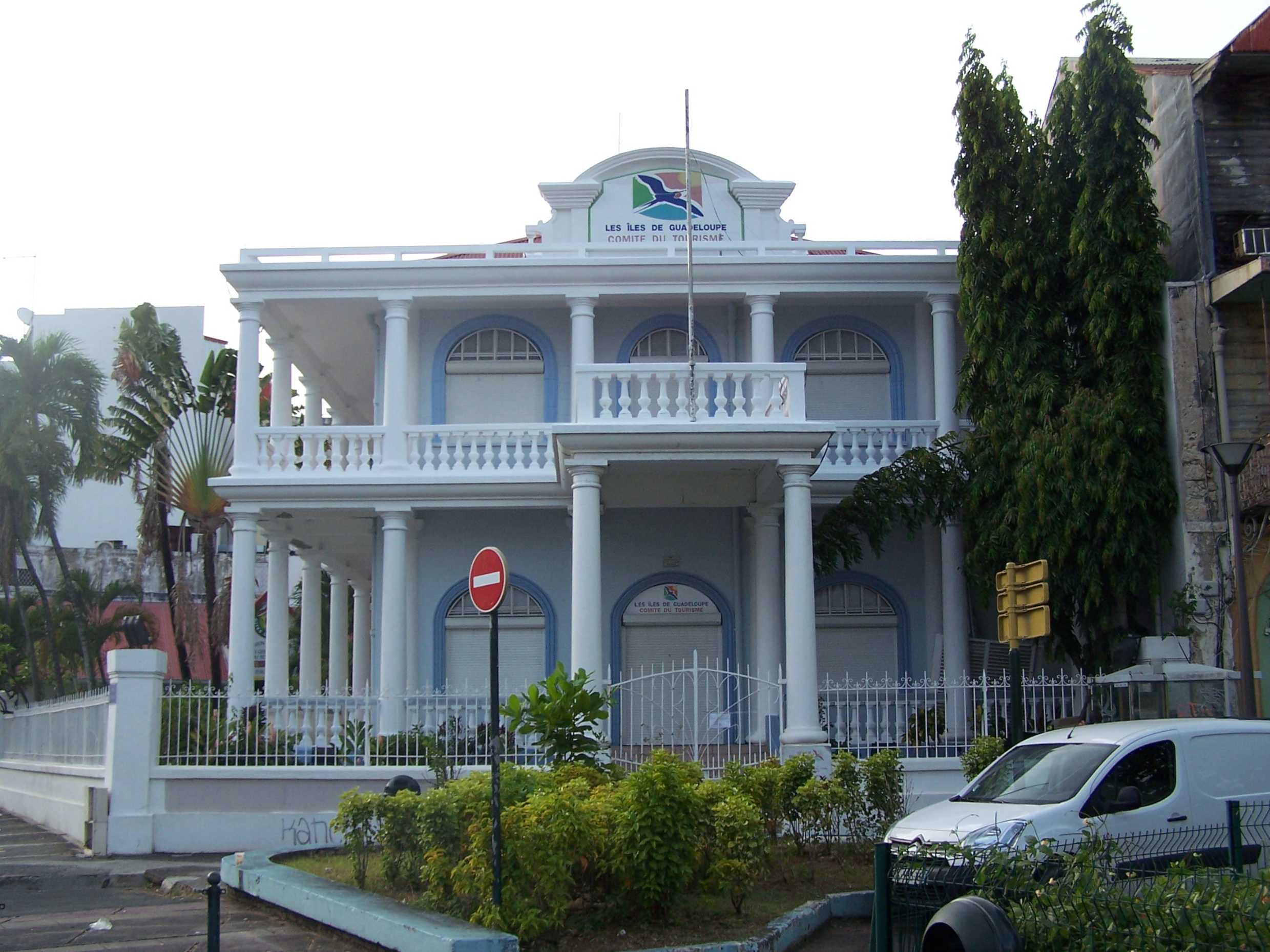
Tourism office of Pointe-à-Pitre

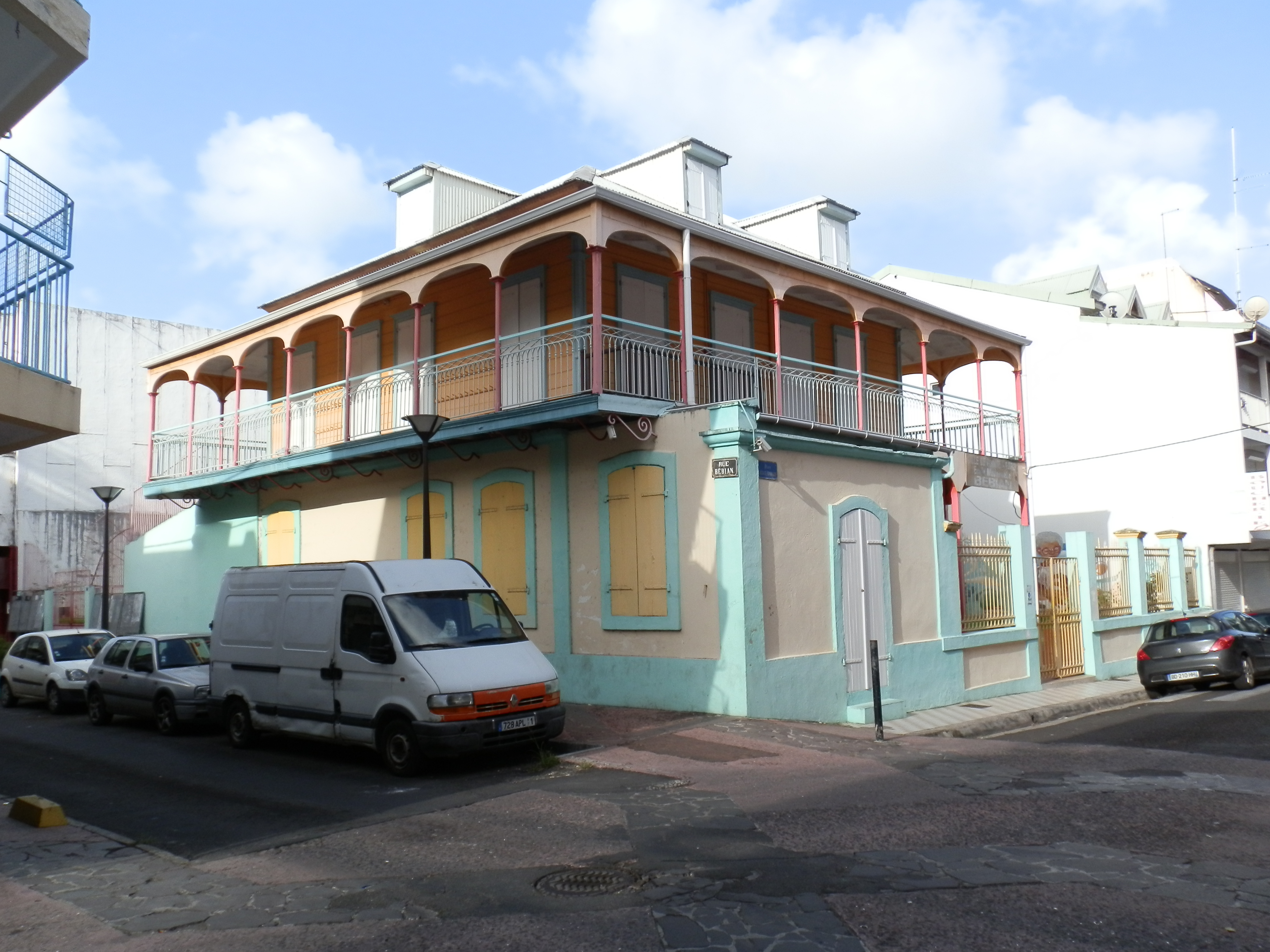
school of Pointe-à-Pitre

== See also ==
- Pointe-à-Pitre International Airport
- Communes of the Guadeloupe department
