= Antoine Richepanse =

French Army officer (1770–1802)

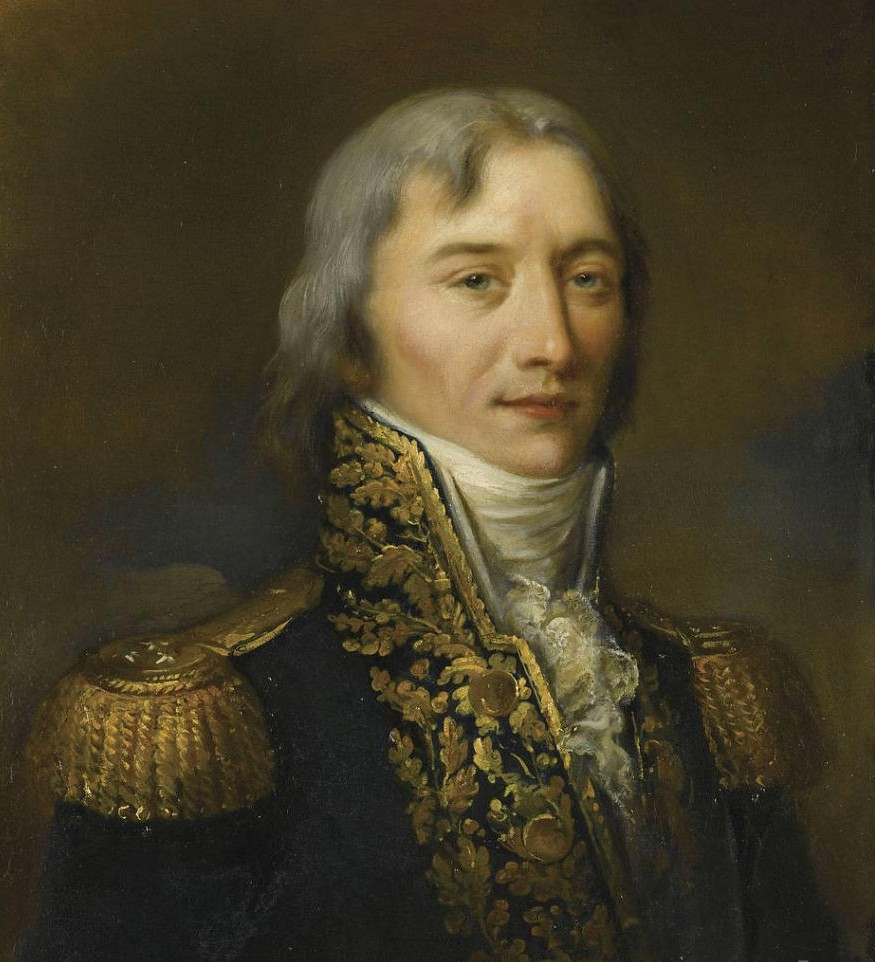
- Portrait by Louis-Édouard Rioult, 1846
- Born: 25 March 1770; Metz, France
- Died: 3 September 1802 (aged 32); Basse-Terre, Guadeloupe
- Military career
- Allegiance: Kingdom of France; French First Republic
- Branch: French Royal Army; French Revolutionary Army
- Service years: 1775–1802
- Rank: Divisional general
- Units: Conti Dragoon Regiment; Army of Sambre and Meuse; Army of the Rhine
- Conflicts: War of the First Coalition; Battle of Siegburg; Battle of Altenkirchen; Battle of Neuwied (1797); War of the Second Coalition; Battle of Hohenlinden (1800)
- Awards: Name inscribed under the Arc de Triomphe

Divisional-General Antoine Richepanse (25 March 1770 – 3 September 1802) was a French Army officer and colonial administrator who served as the governor of Guadeloupe from 1801 to 1802. Richepanse was born in Metz, the son of Antoine Richepanse, a non-commissioned officer in the French Royal Army's Conti Dragoon Regiment. At the age of five he joined his father's regiment as a cadet, and in 1785 Richepanse was promoted to quartermaster sergeant. A supporter of the French Revolution, Richepanse distinguished himself in the early battles of the War of the First Coalition, being promoted to second lieutenant in 1791, lieutenant in September 1792, captain in July 1793 and chef d'escadron in July 1794.

In 1796, he fought in the battles of Siegburg and Altenkirchen as part of the Army of Sambre and Meuse. On 4 June 1796, Jean-Baptiste Kléber promoted Richepanse to brigade general, writing to Jean-Baptiste Jourdan: "I think, my dear comrade, that you will approve this nomination, and that you will persuade the government to confirm it. I attach all the more keen interest to it, as it seems to be the wish of the entire army corps which has witnessed his brilliant actions." In 1797 he was promoted to divisional general and served under the command of Lazare Hoche. Richepanse distinguished himself at the Battle of Neuwied, where the Austrians lost 8000 men, 27 cannons and 7 colours. In 1800, he was part of the Army of the Rhine under Jean Victor Marie Moreau, which defeated the Austrians at Hohenlinden in which he played a conspicuous part.

On 14 May 1802 Richepanse was appointed by First Consul Napoleon Bonaparte as the governor of Guadeloupe. He was given command of an expeditionary force which was dispatched to Guadeloupe to restore French authority in the colony, which was under the de facto control of Black officers. After Richepanse arrived on the island, a battle broke out on 10 May between Richepanse's troops and Black insurgents fearing the possible reintroduction of slavery. Although the insurgents were initially led by the mulatto officer Chef de brigade Magloire Pélage, he quickly switched sides and joined Richepanse, with the position of insurgent leader passing to another mulatto officer, Chef de bataillon Louis Delgrès. 3,000 French troops under Richepanse's command and 600 Black troops led by Pélage eventually drove Delgrès's rebels into Fort Saint Charles, where they committed mass suicide by detonating the fort's gunpowder stores on 28 May.

Richepanse, having lost 40% of his men either to combat or illness, published a resolution on 17 July which abolished wages for freed plantation slaves and rescinded citizenship for free people of colour. For months afterwards, he carried out a brutal counterinsurgency campaign to root out remaining insurgents. Richepanse's campaign quickly became notorious for its brutality and "even his own lieutenants denounced [it] in their reports". Not long after his arrival in Guadeloupe, Richepanse contracted yellow fever from which he died at Basse-Terre on 3 September 1802. The insurgency against French rule in Guadeloupe continued until 1804, when the remaining insurgents surrendered and were allowed to leave the colony.
