= Chef de brigade =

Historical French military rank

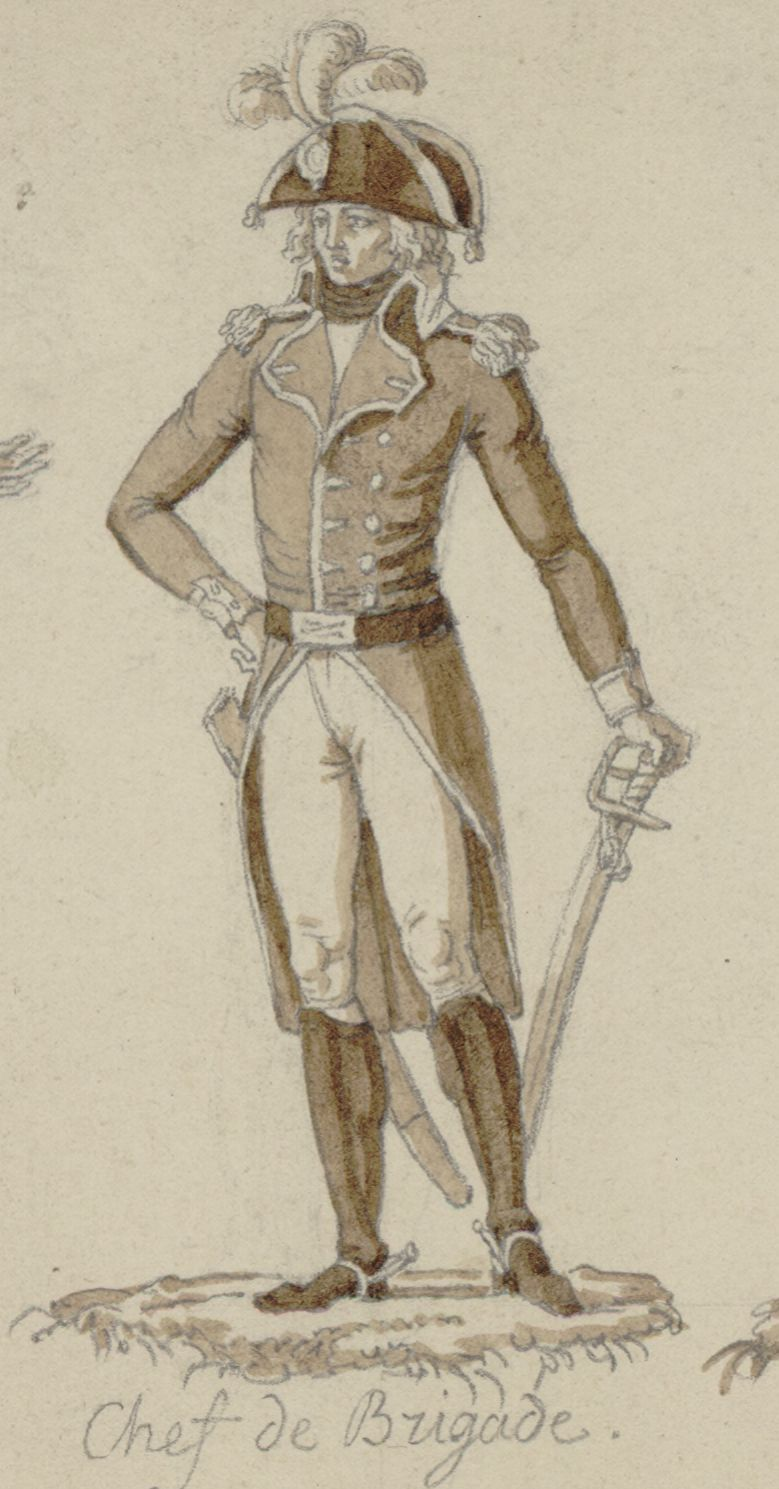
A French Revolutionary Army chef de brigade

Chef de brigade (English: Brigade chief) was a French military rank. It was used as the equivalent of the rank of major in the French Royal Army's artillery units and colonel in the French Revolutionary Army.

== Before the revolution ==
Chef de brigade was equivalent to major in the French Royal Corps of Artillery. Each regiment of artillery was divided into two battalions, each of two brigades under the command of a chef de brigade. This rank was given to the best of the Capitaines en premier (first captains) in a regiment, commanding an artillery brigade that would be able to support an army division.

== During and after the revolution ==
Chef de brigade was equivalent to colonel, in the French Revolutionary army, in command of a demi-brigade. Both that unit (replacing a regiment) and that rank (replacing the rank of mestre de camp) were created at the same time, in 1793. The two designations disappeared just before the institution of the French Empire, in 1803, with the old designations restored.
