= Louis Delgrès =

French military officer and anti-slavery rebellion leader

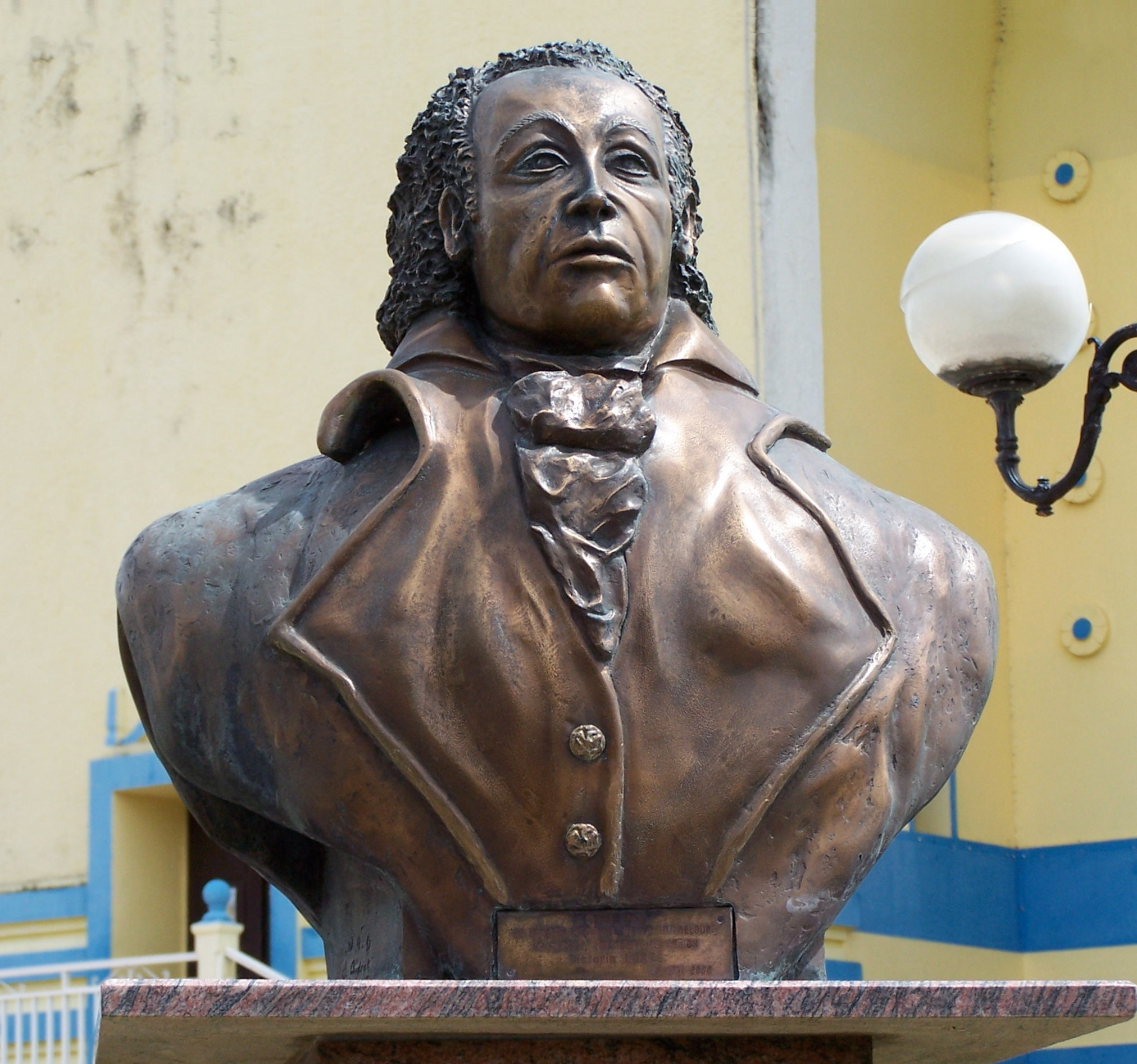
Bust of Louis Delgrès in Petit-Bourg

Louis Delgrès (2 August 1766 – 28 May 1802) was a leader of the movement in Guadeloupe resisting reoccupation and thus the reinstitution of slavery by Napoleonic France in 1802.

== Biography ==
=== Early life ===
Delgrès was born a free mulatto in Saint-Pierre, Martinique. It is supposed that he was the natural son of the Métis woman Élisabeth Morin and Louis Delgrès, the Director-General of the Royal Domains in Tobago.

=== Military career ===
Delgrès joined the colonial militia in November 1783 and was soon made a sergeant in the Martinique garrison. He fought for France against Great Britain in the Caribbean, and was captured and imprisoned with other French soldiers in Portchester Castle.

=== Revolution ===
After his release and his return to the Caribbean, Delgrès took over the resistance movement from Magloire Pélage after it became evident that Pélage was loyal to Napoleon. Delgrès believed that the "tyrant" Napoleon had betrayed both the ideals of the Republic and the interests of France's colored citizens, and intended to fight to the death. The Jacobin government had granted the slaves their freedom, in Guadeloupe and the other French colonies, but Napoleon reinstated slavery throughout the French Empire in 1802.

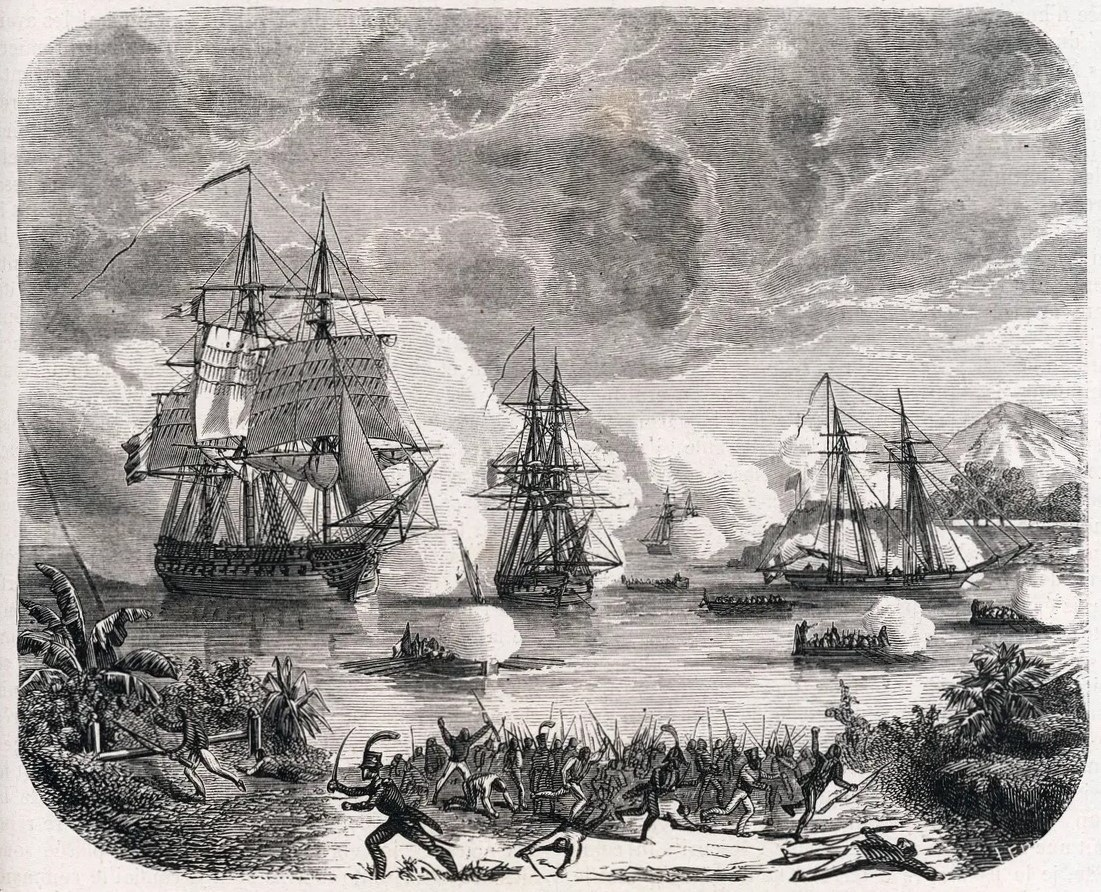
Attack by Napoleonic troops against insurgents in Pointe-à-Pitre, Guadeloupe, during the Richepanse expedition of 1802 aimed at reestablishing slavery on the island

The French army, led by Richepanse, drove Delgrès into Fort Saint Charles, which was held by formerly enslaved Guadeloupeans. After realizing that he could not prevail and refusing to surrender, Delgrès was left with roughly 1000 men and some women. At the Battle of Matouba on 28 May 1802, Delgrès and some of his followers ignited their gunpowder stores, committing suicide in the process, in an attempt to kill as many of the French troops as possible. One of his followers was the pregnant heroine Solitude, who was captured by the French and executed after the birth of her child. In the fictional account of her life by André Schwarz-Bart, her last words were "live free or die", which became the mantra of the resistance movement, and today in poems, songs, libraries, historical markers, museums and statues, symbolizes the spirit of the country.

== Legacy and honours ==
In April 1998, Delgrès was officially admitted to the French Panthéon, although the actual location of his remains is unknown. Delgrès' memorial is opposite that of Toussaint Louverture, leader of the Haitian Revolution, the location of whose remains is also a mystery.

In 2002, the bicentenary of the rebellion, a memorial to Delgrès was erected at Basse-Terre.

He is honoured in street names in Menilmontant, Paris; Vaureal, Val d'Oise; and at Saint-Francois, Petit-Canal and Basse-Terre in Guadeloupe.

The contemporary French Caribbean blues trio Delgres is named after Delgrès.

== See also ==
- La Mulâtresse Solitude
- History of Guadeloupe
- Colonialism
- Siege of Masada (a similar mass suicide)
