= Reinstatement of slavery by Napoleon =

1802 reinstatement of slavery by France

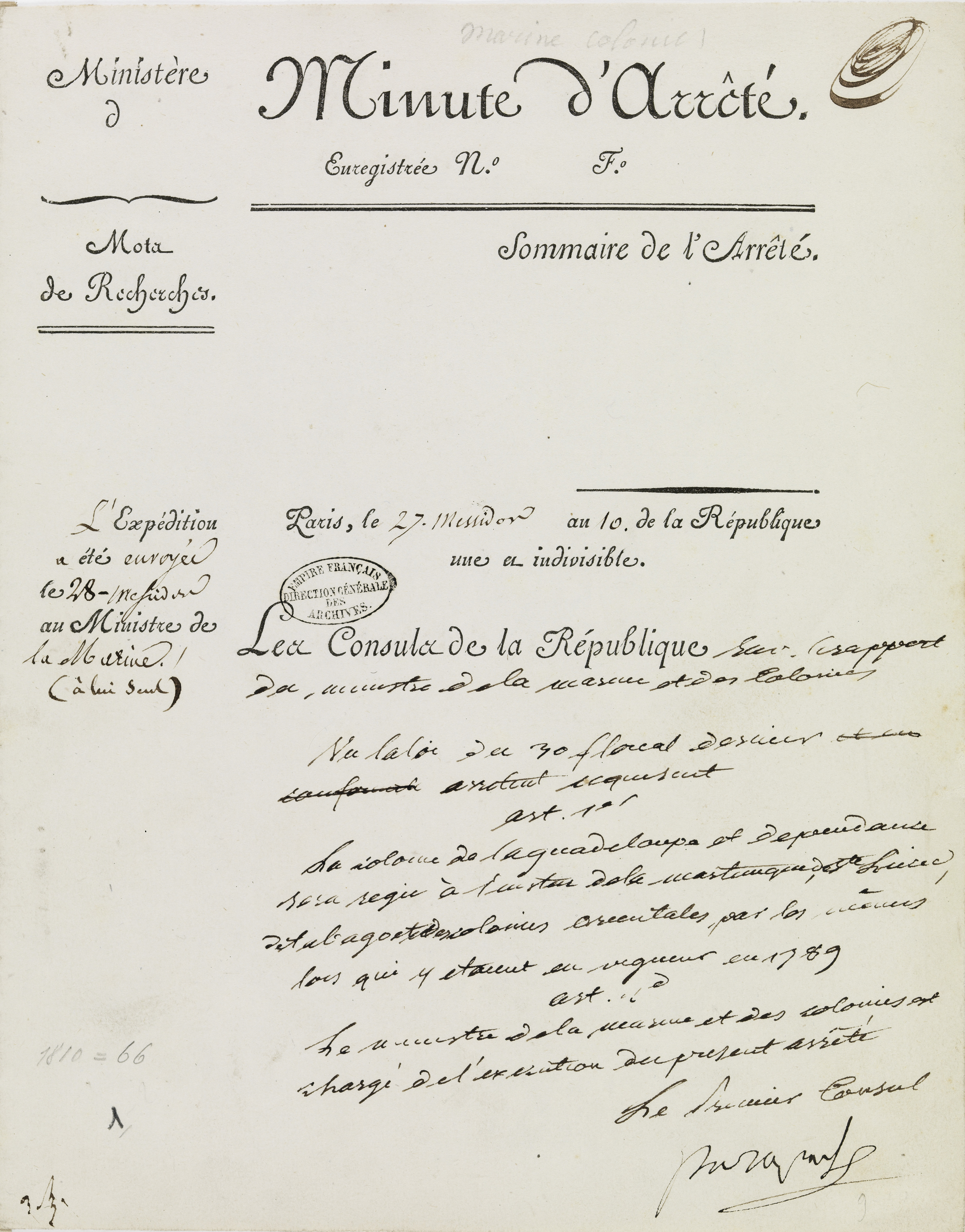
Consular decree of 16 July 1802, signed by Napoleon, reinstating slavery in Guadeloupe.

The reinstatement of slavery by Napoleon refers to a series of texts and military events between 1802 and 1804 that restored slavery in French colonies and France's involvement in the Atlantic slave trade during the early years of Napoleon's rule, thus repealing the decree of 4 February 1794 that had abolished slavery in all colonies during the French Revolution.

Among the notable texts signed by Napoleon were the law of 20 May 1802, which maintained slavery in the colonies of Martinique, Tobago, and Saint Lucia. These colonies, returned to France by Britain under the terms of the Treaty of Amiens, had not applied the 1794 abolition decree due to the refusal of local French colonists, who signed the Whitehall Accord with Britain instead. Napoleon also issued the consular decrees of 16 July 1802 and 7 December 1802, which reinstated slavery in Guadeloupe and Cayenne respectively (previously two of the three territories where abolition was effective). In Réunion and Isle de France, Napoleon had already reassured planters of his support for the continuation of slavery there as early as March 1801.

From his coup d'état in late 1799, Napoleon was influenced by the colonial circles surrounding his wife Joséphine, a Creole from a family of slave-owning planters, but especially by his advisors, often drawn from the teams of Marshal de Castries, former Secretary of State for the Navy. Hesitating for two years, like his advisors, due to political and military risks, Napoleon gradually decreed slavery in all colonies, including the three returned by the British. In Guadeloupe and Saint-Domingue, this reinstatement was enforced through three expeditions, two to Saint-Domingue, mobilizing two-thirds of the French fleet and several tens of thousands of soldiers. The armed resistance of former slaves was thus defeated in Guadeloupe after several thousand deaths but was victorious in Saint-Domingue, where nearly half of the French slaves lived, and which became Haiti in 1804, the second independent former colony after the United States. France was the only country in the world to reinstate slavery in all its colonies eight years after voting for its abolition, also in all its colonies.

This slaveholding policy of Napoleon is the subject of debate regarding its true ideological motivations. For Yves Benot in 1992, it was deliberate, while for others in the 21st century, it resulted from hesitations and opportunistic calculations.

This reinstatement of slavery was accompanied by the establishment of a policy of segregation and discrimination against free people of color harsher than under the Ancien Régime. In the colonies, this return to the pre-1789 system abolished the Decree of 4 April 1792 granting citizenship to freed slaves. In mainland France, the consular decree of 2 July 1802 (13 Messidor Year X) renewed the ban on French territory for them (and slaves), initially enacted in 1763 and 1777. The Civil Code was also amended to institutionalize a racial hierarchy, separating three classes: Whites, free people of color from before 1789, and slaves. Finally, interracial marriages were banned, fulfilling a long-standing demand of the colonial lobby that the Ancien Régime had previously denied.

During the Hundred Days, under British pressure and the Congress of Vienna, Napoleon officially banned the slave trade (but not slavery) through the decree of 29 March 1815. However, this abolition of the slave trade was not enforced as he was defeated two and a half months later at the Battle of Waterloo, then abdicated before his exile to Saint Helena, where he attributed his 1802 decisions to pressures from the colonial lobby. After him, Louis XVIII, Charles X, and Louis-Philippe officially confirmed the ban on the slave trade, though it persisted clandestinely. Slavery itself was not definitively abolished in the French colonies until the decree of 27 April 1848, adopted by the Provisional Government of the Second Republic under the impetus of Deputy Victor Schœlcher.

== Maintenance or reinstatement ==
While slavery was indeed “reinstated” in some colonies where the 1794 abolition had been effective (Guadeloupe, Guiana), in others (Martinique, Réunion), it is referred to as “maintenance” because the abolition decree was not applied due to those colonies being under British occupation or resistance from French colonists. This term is contested by historians.

Several academics, such as Abel Louis and Frédéric Régent, both doctors of history, have studied this nuance in terminology. The notion of "maintenance" of slavery where it was still practiced is "questionable from a strictly legal point of view, as it confuses legality with effectiveness", according to Frédéric Régent: the February 1794 decree "was indeed applicable in principle to all French colonies, even if its implementation was delayed. Consequently, the law of May 20, 1802 re-established slavery in principle in the territories concerned", even if it had persisted in practice. For Abel Louis, "if the law of May 20, 1802 plays on the use of words, slavery is ultimately re-established".

Historians Pierre Branda and Thierry Lentz, members of the Napoleon Foundation, speak of a “gradual advance towards the re-establishment of slavery”, to which Napoleon “was no stranger”, notably through the “violation of the ‘maintenance’ law by his own representatives”.

In the captions accompanying photos of an exhibition by France Télévisions on the subject, the term “official maintenance” is preferred in the specific case of the decree-law of 20 May 1802. However, according to Dominique Taffin, chief curator of heritage and director of the Fondation pour la mémoire de l'esclavage, who organized the exhibition, "it's about recognizing a history and integrating that history, the re-establishment of slavery".

== Context ==
=== Rise of abolitionism ===
As slavery expanded in the 18th century through an intensified slave trade across the Atlantic, an international movement demanded its abolition starting in the 1780s, led by the Society of the Friends of the Blacks and the Quakers, bolstered by a century of British abolitionism. The first British anti-slavery petition was presented to the Parliament of Great Britain in 1783. James Ramsay, having returned from the West Indies, published a three-year investigation in 1784, supported by Charles Middleton, head of the Royal Navy, who wrote to William Wilberforce to advocate for abolition among other MPs. Thomas Clarkson published another investigation in 1786. Massive petitions for abolition, numbering 519, totaled 390,000 signatures in 1792, according to historian Seymour Drescher, a significant portion of a still-rural English population of 8 million.

The Anti-Slavery Society secured a British Crown inquiry in 1788, the same year that saw the work of former slave Cugoano translated into French, while another former slave, Olaudah Equiano, married an Englishwoman.

=== Political and legal context ===
An “anti-sugar” campaign called for a sugar boycott in 1791, the year the Haitian Revolution erupted, terrifying sugar planters united in the Massiac Club. Sugar production collapsed, and despite the rise in its price, the French Revolution abolished slavery nationally through the decree of 4 February 1794 (16 Pluviôse Year II), following its local abolition on the island of Saint-Domingue by the decree of 29 August 1793. The parliament received 653 congratulatory statements by mail, mostly from communes and popular societies, from all departments except three (Corrèze, Alpes-Maritimes, and Léman). Denmark followed in 1794, with the Jamaican sugar boom and that of Louisiana compensating for Saint-Domingue’s production losses by the late 1790s.

Despite the Whitehall Accord between Great Britain and French colonists (through which the latter pledged to cede control of the colonies of Saint-Domingue, Martinique and Guadeloupe to the former in exchange for the preservation of slavery) Guadeloupe remained under the French Republic's control, and in Saint-Domingue, Toussaint Louverture secured the armistice of 1798 for freed slaves, followed by an Anglo-American commercial agreement in 1799. French slaveholders fled, forming the Saint-Domingue diaspora: Louisiana, Jamaica, and 7,000 exiles in Cuba, who launched the Quasi-War and the Caribbean slaveholding piracy.

In France, the Coup of 18 Brumaire brought Napoleon to power, with several figures from the colonial lobby in his entourage. On 25 March 1802, he signed the Treaty of Amiens with the British, recovering Martinique, under British control since 1795, as Napoleon sought to "revive the prosperity of the sugar islands", two years after securing the first step in the Spanish cession of Louisiana to France.

=== Economic context ===
The British and American colonies were weakened by the American Revolutionary War, which saw the former’s per capita exports halved during the 1790s. The nearly 100,000 slaves freed by the British between 1775 and 1784 during the American Revolutionary War, many of whom fled or died of smallpox, altered the dynamics of slavery in the New World.

Before 1789, Saint-Domingue produced approximately 40% to 50% of each of the two major emerging markets, sugar and cotton, and nearly as much for coffee, employing over half of the French slaves, with a majority of foreign clients. The Exclusif Principle, or metropolitan commercial monopoly, was "always at the heart of the colonists' criticisms", who thought to abolish it in 1789, but it had been widely circumvented since the mid-18th century.

When he took power in 1799, Bonaparte envisioned a return to this Exclusif Principle, which had "already become obsolete in the last decades of the Ancien Régime", when Secretaries of State for the Navy, Castries and La Luzerne, tried to enforce it more strictly. For Napoleon in 1801, it could commercially save Saint-Domingue, as its commercial dominance had been overtaken by other countries in just a decade. However, in a private letter to Talleyrand, Bonaparte wrote that the goal of the Saint-Domingue expedition was not “commerce and finance” but “to annihilate the black government in Saint-Domingue”.

==== Saint-Domingue bypasses the Exclusif Principle ====
The French colony of Saint-Domingue, which circumvented the Exclusif Principle reserving colonial production for the metropolis, was by the end of the 18th century the global leader in the three major colonial commodity markets: sugar, coffee, and cotton, exploiting nearly half a million slaves. The colony thus produced 40% of the world’s sugar and 60% of its coffee.

Secondary export crops (cotton and cocoa first, then coffee), which appeared in Saint-Domingue’s statistics in 1730, took off by mid-century. After the Seven Years’ War, lost by France, Louis XV chose to retain the West Indies and cede Canada to the British, neighboring a booming New England. To weaken their Jacobite opponents in the West Indies, London imposed heavy sugar taxes, giving French islands a competitive advantage. Three-quarters of the sugar from the French West Indies was thus re-exported to the rest of Europe, often smuggled on British ships, while sugarcane molasses was frequently smuggled to New England distilleries.

This dominant colonial position, achieved by Saint-Domingue in the 1770s and 1780s, is also reflected in slave trade statistics. From 1783 to 1792, a "golden age of the slave trade in Bordeaux", saw the city organize over half of its historical slave trade operations. The share of the slave trade in Bordeaux’s colonial shipping tripled to 12% by 1783, then continued to rise, benefiting from Saint-Domingue’s land expansion, with 70% of all voyages by Bordeaux slave traders destined for this location throughout their history.

Bordeaux ships focused on East Africa’s coast (Mozambique, Zanzibar) only from 1787. They benefited earlier, from 1777, from royal financial incentives for long-distance trade in Angola, leading to a high number of slaves arriving in Saint-Domingue from the Congo River and Angola, traditional slave trade zones of the declining Portuguese Empire by the end of the 18th century. New shipping companies formed in Bordeaux in the 1780s, with three-quarters of the whites departing from this port for overseas heading to Saint-Domingue.

The economic weight of Saint-Domingue in the global economy in 1789 is also reflected in the 150 million gold franc indemnity demanded in 1825 for Saint-Domingue planters under the threat of French invasion, reduced by 40% in 1838 to 90 million gold francs, an amount exceeding, given monetary depreciation, the indemnity paid for the definitive abolition of slavery in 1848 in all other colonies. This reflects the economic weight of Saint-Domingue before slavery was permanently abolished there in 1791–1793.

==== New producers ====
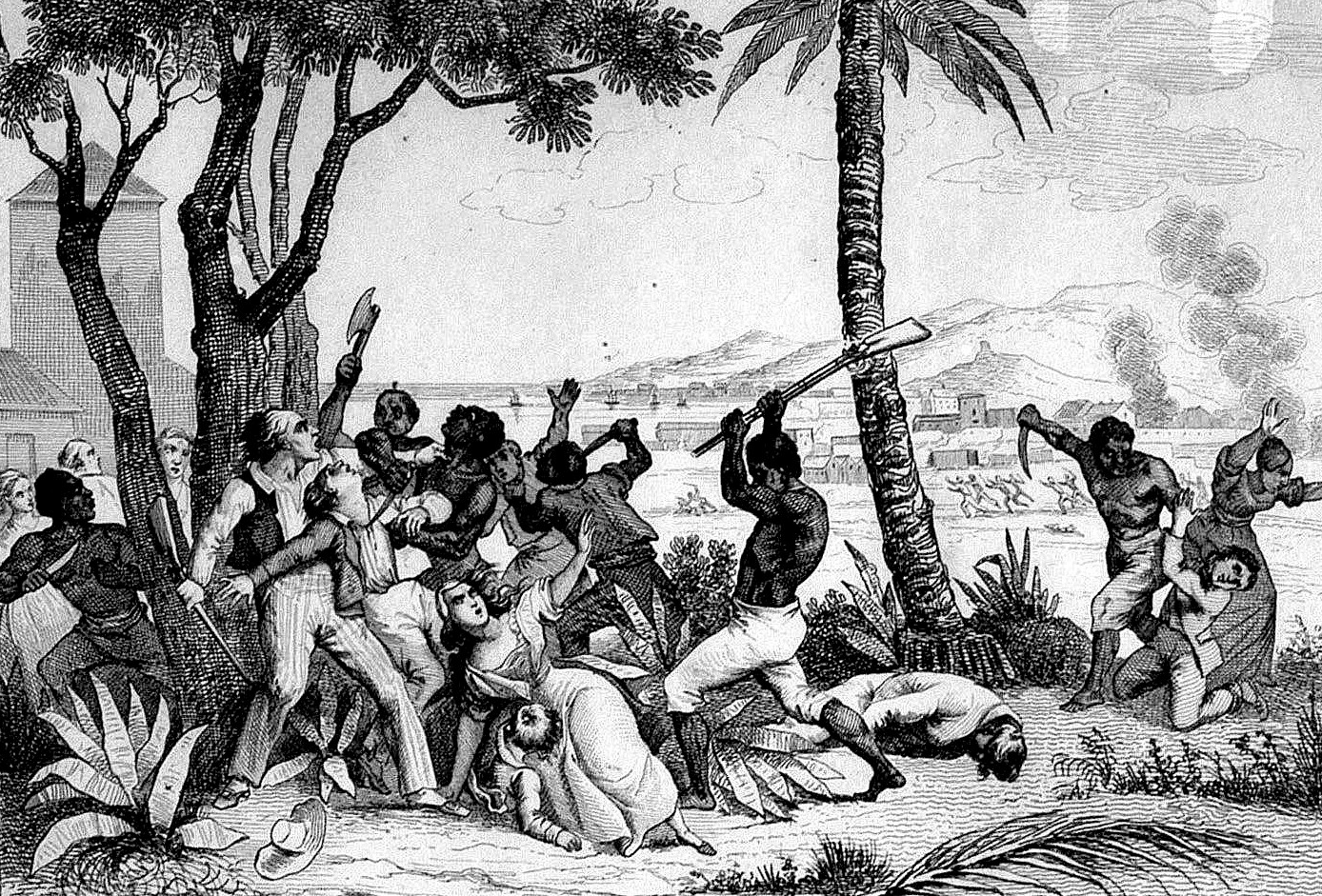
Slaves revolting against their masters in Saint-Domingue in 1791.

The Haitian Revolution in 1791 was a seismic event for the global markets of coffee, sugar, and cotton, which immediately turned to other producing countries. These countries capitalized on the price surge of these commodities in the early 1790s to take its place:

Boosted from 1791 by Saint-Domingue’s collapse, Jamaica saw its sugarcane production double in thirteen years after 1792, reaching a peak of 110,000 tonnes (110,000 long tons; 120,000 short tons) in 1805, surpassing the peak achieved by Saint-Domingue just before the Haitian Revolution. From 1798, when the British signed the Armistice of 30 March 1798 with Toussaint Louverture, most large Saint-Domingue planters left the island to settle permanently in Jamaica. Over 2,000 did so in the summer of 1798 alone, doubling the number of French refugees from Saint-Domingue in Jamaica. Their production’s commercial outlets benefited from the Franco-British peace negotiations launched in spring 1801, with preliminary agreements signed on 1 October 1801.

Jamaica’s coffee production was even more stimulated, rising from one million pounds in 1789 to 22 million in 1804. In Cuba, which produced ten times less coffee than Saint-Domingue, other white owners fleeing Saint-Domingue, often leaving later, made fortunes by investing from 1800 in a Coffee revolution in Cuba. The arrival of “free blacks from Haiti” in 1798 led to threats of lynching against Vicente Perroussel, France’s consul in Santiago de Cuba. In 1800, Prudencio Casamayor, one of the French refugees from Saint-Domingue in Cuba, founded the largest coffee trading house there. Capital gained by these exiled planters in the privateering war against Toussaint Louverture was reinvested in coffee around 1800. Venezuela became another major coffee producer by investing at the same time as Jamaica. Until then, coffee cultivation in the Táchira State had been left to slaves by their owners, but from 1793, they invested in coffee cultivation, which became far more profitable, preferring it to cocoa, of which they held a near-global monopoly in the previous century but only half at the start of the 19th century.

== Influences ==
The hypothesis of an intervention by Joséphine de Beauharnais in favor of reinstating slavery is sometimes raised because her parents owned a sugar plantation in Martinique with 150 slaves. She settled in Paris when her first husband was tasked with representing the nobility of the island of Saint-Domingue at the Estates General of 1789. They defended the monarchy, then aligned with revolutionary figures after the trial of Louis XVI in 1792, without managing to save her husband from death. One of their sons was adopted by Napoleon, who made him an aide-de-camp in 1796. The other, remarried in 1800 to the daughter of the Nantes shipowner Fortin, enriched in Saint-Domingue, was made a senator. Toussaint Louverture requested that Joséphine's large plantation in Léogâne, Saint-Domingue, inherited from her husband, be cultivated in her absence.

The hypothesis of interference by Joséphine de Beauharnais in the reinstatement of slavery is refuted by historians who emphasize that others could have had influence, particularly those appointed by Bonaparte to high positions following his coup d’état in late 1799. At the time, beyond his wife, there was a strong political current in favor of slavery around Bonaparte. According to Jean-Joël Brégeon, an entire Creole party, including Joséphine, demanded the return of slavery to the plantations. This point is confirmed by historian Jean-François Niort, who highlights the influence of a slaveholding lobby in the decision to reinstate slavery. Manipulated by the slaveholding lobby, Bonaparte believed that Guadeloupe was in chaos – which was false – and that restoring order required reinstating slavery, explains the historian.

In his Saint Helena memoirs, Napoleon himself explained that he ultimately decided on the Saint-Domingue expedition in response to the clamor of planters and speculators exiled in Paris. However, the analysis of their numerous writings between 1800 and 1802, conducted by academic Philippe Girard, revealed a more nuanced picture: some feared that reinstating slavery would trigger a bloody war that would devastate Saint-Domingue and preferred not to touch the law of 4 February 1794.

Colonial circles were heavily involved in the Club de Clichy, formed at the bottom of rue de Clichy after Robespierre’s fall, led by Vincent-Marie Viénot de Vaublanc. Among its figures were Charles Gravier de Vergennes, allied to the daughter of Guadeloupean planter Jean Baptiste Pinel de La Palun, and Charles Malo François Lameth, who married Marie Picot, a wealthy owner of sugar plantations in Saint-Domingue.

Among them was also Pierre-Alexandre-Laurent Forfait, whom, after the 18 Brumaire, Napoleon Bonaparte appointed Minister of the Navy and who later prepared at the Council of State the fleet for an invasion of England after resigning in 1801 to be replaced by Denis Decrès, a veteran of the American War. Guillemin de Vaivre, former intendant of Saint-Domingue and then director of the general colonial administration in Paris from 1790 to 1792, before being sidelined by the Revolution, regained his seat in 1800, with Bonaparte appointing him to reinstate slavery. His successor François Barbé-Marbois was promoted in 1801 to Minister of the Treasury, tasked with negotiating the treaty for the cession of Louisiana to the United States, which did not prevent the financial crisis of 1805, leading to his dismissal on 27, worsened by a mismanagement issue with the Négociants réunis, where Gabriel-Julien Ouvrard was also involved, though Bonaparte appointed him in 1807 as First President of the Court of Audit.

== Reactions, censorship, and public opinion ==
The analysis by historian Jean-Claude Halpern of two series of almanacs from peddler literature, published between 1775 and 1816, showed the difficulty of precisely knowing the public opinion of the time. In 1803, one of them, Le Messager boiteux, cited the violent rejection of black power by General Leclerc, leader of the Saint-Domingue expedition, attributing it to the disastrous influence of revolutionary ideas. Subsequently, Le Messager boiteux did not mention the failure of this Saint-Domingue expedition, likely due to Napoleonic censorship.

The public’s support for the decree of 29 August 1793 was celebrated by 653 congratulatory statements to Parliament, received by mail and archived, mostly from communes and popular societies, from all departments except three (Corrèze, Alpes-Maritimes, and Léman).

The public’s opposition to Napoleon’s reinstatement of slavery is also established, according to historian Philippe Girard, in police reports submitted by Interior Minister Joseph Fouché to Napoleon, particularly notable as in 1802, Napoleon was at the height of his popularity after the Peace of Amiens and his victories in Italy. The same source had previously highlighted signs of a genuine satisfaction two and a half years earlier during Napoleon’s coup of 18 Brumaire.

Among the members of the legislative body, 54 voted for the reinstatement of slavery, with 27 opposing, but two months earlier, Bonaparte had removed from this assembly, which was no longer elected but appointed, 20 members likely to oppose it.

These police reports also highlight popular opposition to the Saint-Domingue expedition, to which Joseph Fouché was one of the few to oppose within the Council of State, entirely appointed by Napoleon. As Minister of the Interior, Fouché supported allowing some abolitionists opposing Napoleon to express themselves, believing, for example, that they should leave Henri Grégoire alone, as no one will read him.

Henri Grégoire had founded the Institute of France during the Revolution, to which he presented his second personal work on colonial issues in May 1800, six years after his 1794 publication. In this book, Abbé Grégoire denounced a slander by Pierre Victor Malouët, appointed to the Council of State in 1799, who had reused an argument from 1788, claiming that Bartolomé de las Casas, the famous 16th-century bishop of Chiapas, out of pity for the Indians, devised the African slave trade, making, according to Malouët, less odious those who, not having willingly created this sad expedient, are forced to use it today. Abbé Grégoire thus aimed to remind that abolitionism had long been defended within the Catholic Church, which was otherwise mistreated by French revolutionaries in the 1790s. For historian Yves Benot, this book is articulated to the rest of humanist oppositions to what he calls Napoleonic racism. In 1808, as Napoleon I, now emperor, hesitated to follow Britain in abolishing the slave trade, Abbé Grégoire published De la littérature des nègres, a true manifesto against the reinstatement of slavery and the slave trade, which received a discreet reception in France but achieved wide success abroad through translations, a prelude to his call at the Congress of Vienna in 1815, aiming to universalize the repression of the slave trade.

Belgian politician, philosopher, and historian Hervé Hasquin spoke out during the bicentennial of Napoleon’s death in response to the newspaper L'Écho, regarding the weight to be given to the reinstatement of slavery in this commemoration, which would be for some a true fixation. According to him, it must be placed in context: Napoleon only aligned with the dominant opinion and the planters’ lobby in the colonies. The cities of Nantes and Bordeaux participated in the slave trade and triangular trade in the 18th century, as did a number of Belgian capitalists at the time.

Regarding the year 1794, historian Jean-Claude Halpern suggests that the reductive and derogatory image of Africa given by the almanac Les Étrennes, previously more measured, likely reflects the shift in part of public opinion as news emerged about the Saint-Domingue revolt, after a 2-to-4-month delay due to distance, particularly the accounts of the fate of Whites. A few months earlier, 500 people had perished during the Battle of Cap-Français lost by General Galbaud, some in the fire that ravaged the finest city in the West Indies.

From the 1799 coup d’état, the censorship and official propaganda of the Napoleonic regime imposed a massively unequal ideology, through numerous press articles, pamphlets, and large works aiming to justify the colonization of the West Indies: the contributions of the Enlightenment were then openly rejected in favor of pseudoscientific theories aiming to classify and hierarchize human races, while loudly proclaiming the vocation of superior beings to civilize others, according to detailed analyses of the era’s publications compiled by historian Yves Benot in a 1992 book.

In this book, Yves Benot also analyzes the persistence of pockets of resistance to censorship, emanating from anti-slavery advocates, not only the most prominent like Henri Grégoire but also more moderate liberals such as Amaury Duval, Pierre-Louis Ginguené, Jean-Baptiste Say, Joseph-Marie de Gérando, Dominique Dufour de Pradt, and Antoine Destutt de Tracy. He also notes, as evidenced by the case of Pierre Page, that the slaveholding lobby of the colonists had significantly weakened since 1794, and those who loudly proclaimed their convictions after 1799 likely felt supported by the authorities.

The most virulent attack against abolition was the book by Félix Carteau, published in 1801, demanding a return to slavery by expressing truths (...) still suitable for guiding the government on the means to revive agriculture on this unfortunate island,. Like the book Égarements du négrophilisme by Louis-Narcisse Baudry Des Lozieres, also published in 1801, it was only widely distributed in 1802, after the departure of the Leclerc expedition: these two books were the consequence of Bonaparte’s ideological shift rather than its primary cause, and were never mentioned in his correspondence. However, many colonial experts did not believe it was possible in the Caribbean to reverse the 1794 law, while others hesitated to openly demand a return to slavery at a time when metropolitan public opinion was hostile to the planters. Admiral Laurent Jean François Truguet, influenced by Middleton's abolitionism, instead put all his weight against reinstating slavery, through four reports to Bonaparte in 1799–1800, to dissuade him. Toussaint Louverture, for his part, made considerable efforts to control the flow of information from Saint-Domingue and ultimately decided to prohibit his enemies from leaving the colony.

== Napoleon’s hesitation ==
Historian Thierry Lentz notes that Napoleon initially did not want to reverse the abolition of slavery in 1799. His colleague Jean-Joël Brégeon emphasizes that he instead envisioned a new transitional status tailored to each colony, but ultimately did not decide on this matter. Summarizing various interpretations, historian Philippe Girard highlights that Napoleon primarily hesitated for two years, considering the risks posed by armed former slaves in Guadeloupe and Saint-Domingue and the diplomatic context.

Slavery was, according to him, Napoleon’s preference since he reinstated or maintained it wherever he could, but he recognized that it would be difficult in Saint-Domingue, where the black population was five times larger than in Martinique and well-armed: from late 1799 to spring 1802, Napoleon preferred to publicly state his intention not to reinstate it to avoid strong opposition. During these two years, he continually wavered between two difficultly compatible choices: ally with Toussaint Louverture, whose army was the most powerful in the West Indies and immune to tropical epidemics, to conquer Jamaica or even Mexico, or instead reestablish white authority through a military expedition massive enough to bypass an agreement with Toussaint Louverture.

For two years, slave owners, officers, and bureaucrats flooded the Ministry of the Navy with a deluge of memoirs and petitions to influence Napoleon, who was also aware that British naval dominance posed an additional risk, preventing him from assembling too large or visible a fleet. After several cautious attempts, he committed two-thirds of the French Navy only in December 1801, once the Peace of Amiens with Britain was nearly signed.

In December 1799, upon taking power, Napoleon considered sending a maritime expedition to Saint-Domingue, but days later opted instead to send three emissaries to reconnect with Toussaint Louverture. In January 1800, he prepared another fleet, which was scattered by a storm and then sent to Egypt. In February 1801, a third fleet was officially destined for Saint-Domingue, but it served as a ruse to divert the attention of the Royal Navy and facilitate the dispatch of reinforcements to Egypt. It was ultimately in February 1801 that Napoleon finally decided which policy to adopt: to ally with Louverture, whose children were studying in France. He addressed a letter to him, signed by his own hand—an unusual honor for a mere governor—announcing that abolition would be maintained in Saint-Domingue. But this letter was never sent: Napoleon instead decided to remove Louverture from the list of officers.

A serious event had just occurred: the assassination in early March 1801 by a conspiracy of Paul I of Russia. His son Alexander I of Russia did not share his adventurous foreign policy, particularly the plan to seize part of British India. The idea of France capitalizing on this by launching a simultaneous attack on Jamaica, also British, suddenly collapsed. Shortly after, Britain adjusted its diplomacy and sent France its first serious peace proposals, which evolved thereafter. For Bonaparte, these initially had the drawback of requiring the abandonment of Egypt, one of his early battlegrounds. But the British ultimately agreed to return Martinique to France, which in exchange relinquished Naples, Rome, and fishing rights, and by October 1801, preliminary peace terms were signed between the two countries.

Meanwhile, Napoleon also changed his plans. Since he now had to abandon any project to invade Jamaica, and with peace with Britain taking shape, he no longer needed Toussaint Louverture’s army. On 4 May 1801, a month and a half after the Tsar’s assassination, Napoleon ordered the assembly of 3,600 soldiers in Brest to form the core of the Saint-Domingue expedition, which set sail six months later after its numbers had been multiplied by five.

Alerted, Toussaint Louverture then stationed troops in the eastern part of his island, ceded to France by Spain in 1795, to prevent Napoleon from landing there. During that same year of 1801, Toussaint Louverture sought to strengthen ties with Britain by proposing to Jamaican planters to sell their slaves, to make them free cultivators in Saint-Domingue, though subject to mandatory labor. To reassure them, he reduced their wages and even drafted an authoritarian constitution in the summer of 1801. The delays of over two months for exchanging letters between Europe and the Caribbean complicated his task, as well as Napoleon’s: from December 1801, Paris was forced to delegate decisions, once the Saint-Domingue expedition began, to its leader, Charles Victoire Emmanuel Leclerc, Napoleon’s brother-in-law, pre-appointed captain general of Saint-Domingue. Shortly before his departure, on 18 November 1801, Napoleon signed a new letter promising to maintain the abolition of slavery in Saint-Domingue.

== Invasion projects in Jamaica, Mexico, and Louisiana ==
Shortly after taking power in November 1799, Napoleon received numerous recommendations, often in the form of written documents, urging him to accommodate the republican general Toussaint Louverture by not reversing the 1794 abolition of slavery, in order to use his army in Saint-Domingue, the most powerful in the West Indies, to prepare invasion projects in Jamaica, Mexico, and Louisiana. These three projects were in competition with the option of reinstating slavery. The most serious, the Jamaica project, was abandoned due to the peace emerging in March 1801 with Britain following the assassination of the Russian Tsar, who also planned to annex part of the British colonies in India.

=== Jamaica ===
The British colony of Jamaica had benefited for a decade from the influx of French refugees from Saint-Domingue in Jamaica, fleeing the Haitian Revolution. They were particularly numerous in 1798, nearly 2,000, including the wealthiest sugar planters of the island, protesting the armistice of 30 March 1798 signed by Toussaint Louverture with the British.

To attack and annex Jamaica, the new global sugar leader since the revolt in Saint-Domingue, which had doubled its sugar production, Napoleon needed to secure the support of Toussaint Louverture’s army and thus forgo reinstating slavery. In a retrospective of his life written in Saint Helena, shortly after signing a stillborn decree abolishing slavery in 1815, he recalled his 1800 plan to use Louverture’s army to invade Jamaica, the United States, or Spanish colonies. He recalled his idea: to adopt that of Victor Hugues, France’s agent in Guadeloupe after the 1794 abolition, who had used the island’s former slaves, first armed to successfully defend it against the British, then to attack neighboring French colonies where planters refused to abolish slavery.

These memories of Napoleon in 1815 align with his archived statements in 1800, where he argued against reinstating slavery before a Council of State largely sympathetic to the colonial lobby. He explained that Saint-Domingue would belong to the British if the blacks were not bound to us by the interest of their freedom. They will produce less sugar, perhaps, than as slaves; but they will produce it for us, and they will serve, if needed, as soldiers. For if we have one less sugar plantation, we will have, in addition, a citadel occupied by friendly soldiers, he argued.

In his Traité d'économie politique of 1801, Pierre-François Page, son of a former planter who died in 1792 in a massacre in Saint-Domingue, also warned of the dangers of reinstating slavery in Saint-Domingue, arguing that it is preferable to use Toussaint Louverture’s army to attack France’s enemies in the Caribbean.

During the two years leading up to the Peace of Amiens, negotiated from spring 1801 and signed in 1802 with the British, the idea of seizing Jamaica was the most frequently cited, as a Jamaican sugar boom had indeed doubled the island’s production in the years following the Saint-Domingue revolt, with British planters adapting to the soaring sugar prices caused by the collapse of the French colony’s production, which accounted for 40% of global sugar before the 1790s.

But on 12 March 1801, Russian plans against British India collapsed after the assassination of Paul I: his son Alexander I did not share his adventurous foreign policy, suddenly making a simultaneous French attack on Jamaica, whose sugar plantations were important to the British colonial empire, less appealing. Britain seized the opportunity to make its first serious peace proposals.

=== Mexico ===
Another invasion project discussed by Napoleon’s advisors was to invade Mexico, a leading global silver producer,, to capitalize on the decline of the Spanish Empire, where most independence wars began in the mid-1800s.

=== Louisiana ===
Invasion projects in Louisiana were less numerous and less substantiated, as there was far less wealth, except for numerous but scattered and superficial lead deposits around St. Louis, left undeveloped due to their dispersal and exposure to recurrent Native American raids.

In 1764, France had ceded its North American territories after the Seven Years’ War following a series of failures, notably sending 7,000 Alsatians between 1718 and 1722, most of whom quickly perished, and the Natchez Revolt in the Natchez District plantations between 1729 and 1732. European rivalries had armed Native American tribes despite or because of their aggression, who were immune to their diseases since the 1730s, and by 1746, Louisiana had only 3,200 French Whites and 4,700 Blacks, mainly around New Orleans. It still had only about 5,000 slaves in 1760, as many as White settlers, but no significant crop found an external market, and no slaves had been imported since 1731. A weakened Spain, which took over the west bank of the Mississippi in 1763, remained largely deserted despite efforts to bring in Acadians in 1784 and non-hostile Native Americans in 1787 to create a buffer zone between the St. Louis area and hostile Native Americans, with little success.

The British had acquired the east bank of the Mississippi from France in 1764, which became U.S. property in 1784 after the American Revolutionary War. The Ohio Valley and the Natchez District, excellent cotton and grain lands, experienced strong demographic growth in the 1790s. In 1794–1795, the rapid success of the cotton gin, invented by Eli Whitney, led American settlers, led by businessman Daniel Clark, to demand the New Orleans free trade zone. Juan Ventura Morales, the Spanish intendant of Louisiana linked to American settlers, yielded to their pressure during the Treaty of Madrid (1795): navigation on the river to the Gulf of Mexico was now tax-exempt.

Faced with risks to its budget and borders, the Spanish metropole failed to create a buffer zone between the United States and the edges of its empire (California, Texas, Florida) by bringing in Acadians and Native Americans from 1784–1787. This policy was replaced in October 1800 by the Treaty of San Ildefonso, which gave Louisiana to France in exchange for the small Kingdom of Etruria created by Napoleon in the Grand Duchy of Tuscany.

The terms of the Treaty of San Ildefonso, confidentiality and a ban on reselling Louisiana to the United States, were not respected by Napoleon from early 1802. The emissary Pierre Samuel du Pont de Nemours was already in Paris when U.S. President Thomas Jefferson asked him in April to negotiate the purchase of Louisiana in its entirety, not just the port lock of New Orleans, which the U.S. Congress had previously refused. This meant not only free navigation on the river but also heavy borrowing for a Westward Expansion, opposed by northeastern states, some of which had already abolished slavery.

On 16 June 1802, Juan Ventura Morales threatened to suspend the New Orleans free trade zone, sparking such outrage in the United States that Thomas Jefferson easily imposed the purchase of Louisiana in its entirety, for an amount that allowed Napoleon to finance the construction, launched on 11 March 1803, via the Camp de Boulogne, of a fleet to invade England, while the Louisiana Purchase took effect on 30 April 1803. On 16 May 1803, the British seized about a hundred French and Batavian ships, and France declared war on them.

== Maintenance and reinstatement of slavery in French colonies ==
=== Martinique, Saint Lucia, and Tobago ===
==== Whitehall Accord to Peace of Amiens ====
In the island of Martinique, French colonists triggered an insurrection on 16 September 1793 after signing the Whitehall Accord of 19 February 1793, negotiated with the British by Pierre-Victor Malouët, a planter from Saint-Domingue who emigrated to London in 1792.

At the request of local slaveholders, from 6 February 1794 to 21 March 1794, the British conquered Martinique, where local French colonists assisted them in exchange for their decision not to abolish slavery on the island despite strong pressure from abolitionist movements in metropolitan Britain. During the Treaty of Amiens of 26 March 1802, France agreed to evacuate Milan and Rome and recovered Martinique from the British. Shortly thereafter, the law of 20 May 1802 primarily concerned Martinique, along with Tobago and Saint Lucia, also recovered through the Peace of Amiens.

This law of 20 May 1802 theoretically did not apply to Guadeloupe, Saint-Domingue, or French Guiana. However, it was passed during the reinstatement of slavery in Guadeloupe, where General Antoine Richepance arrived on 6 May, accompanied by former colonial administrators who stripped and humiliated the black volunteers welcoming them, then fought others until the end of May.

==== Constitutionality ====
The words “slavery” and “reinstatement” are not explicitly mentioned in the law of 20 May 1802. However, Article 3 of the law states that the slave trade and their importation into said colonies shall take place in accordance with existing laws and regulations. The repeal of the 1794 law is implicitly mentioned by Article 4, which states that notwithstanding all previous laws, the colonial regime is subject, for ten years, to regulations to be made by the government.

Article 4 is, according to historian Jean-François Niort, unconstitutional because it grants the executive power a ten-year delegation of authority to legislate in place of the executive council, a delegation not provided for in the Constitution of the time, with subsequent ones not allowing such an extended delegation.

The consular decree applicable to Guadeloupe, dated 16 July 1802 and decided in Paris but not published in the Official Journal, yet unanimously regarded by historians as reinstating slavery in Guadeloupe, specifies that the colony of Guadeloupe and its dependencies shall be governed like Martinique, Saint Lucia, and Tobago, a detail that mitigates the specific scope often attributed to certain colonies under the law of 20 May 1802.

=== Guadeloupe ===
According to historian Laurent Dubois, the expansion of republican ideals had been strengthened in Guadeloupe by the decisive mobilization of armies of former slaves in the service of the Republic against the British, enabling France to retain Guadeloupe while French colonists had handed Martinique to the British in 1794.

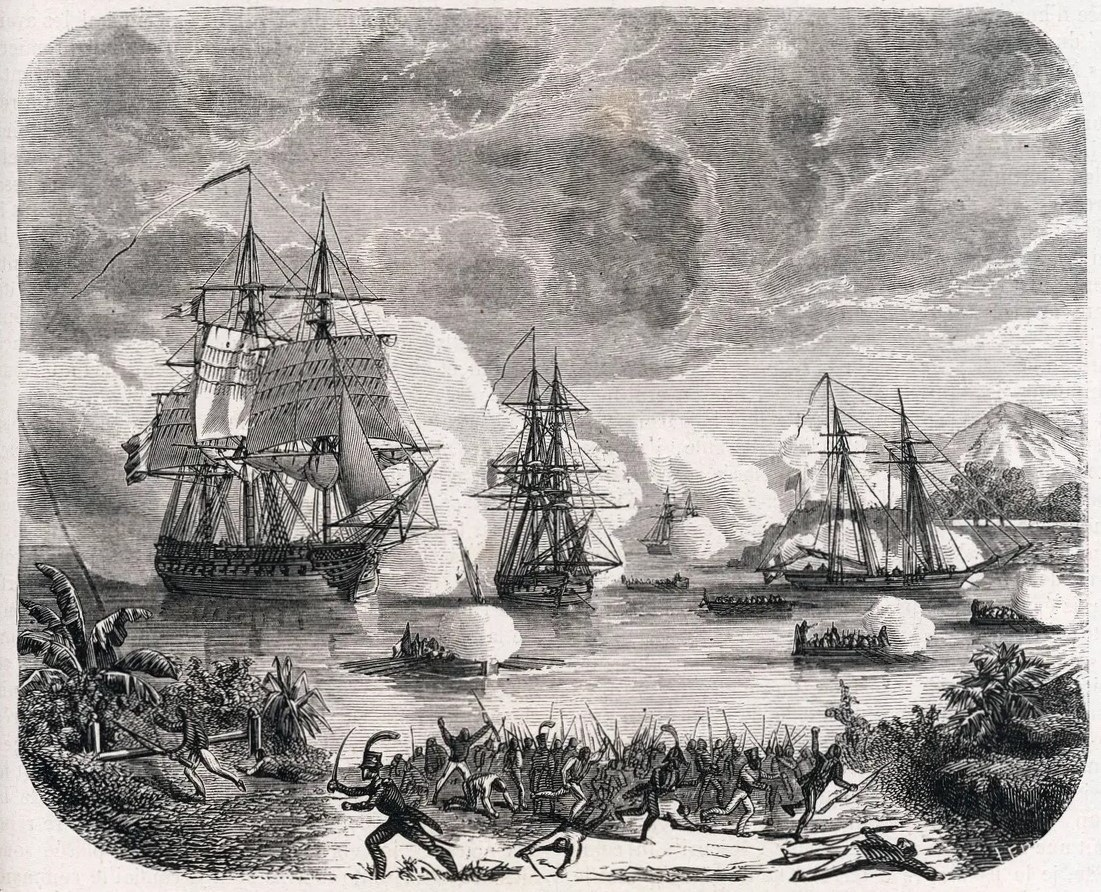
Attack by Napoleonic troops in Pointe-à-Pitre, Guadeloupe, during the Richepance expedition of 1802, which reinstated slavery on the island.

Thus, in Guadeloupe, a force of 3,500 soldiers from France, commanded by Richepance, landed on 6 May 1802 and quickly faced resistance from several hundred local soldiers, including battalion commander Louis Delgrès, who declared: "resistance to oppression is a natural right". From 10 May 1802, Delgrès rallied part of the colony’s troops (including men born free of color, mixed-race individuals, slaves freed during the Revolution, and some whites) and entered into rebellion, while another part of the garrison (led by brigade commander Magloire Pélage) submitted to Richepance. After retreating from Pointe-à-Pitre to the south of Basse-Terre, Delgrès’ men barricaded themselves on 20 May 1802 in Fort Saint-Charles for a final stand, after which 300 revolutionaries took refuge at the foot of La Grande Soufrière, in Matouba (commune of Saint-Claude) and chose to commit suicide by detonating barrels of black powder on 28 May 1802. Other opponents of slavery, from Guadeloupe and Haiti, were deported to Corsica.

The reinstatement of slavery in Guadeloupe, initially imposed militarily and illegally by General Richepance, was later formalized by another legislative measure, the consular decree of 27 Messidor Year X (16 July 1802), long overlooked by historiography and preserved at the Archives Nationales. This text stipulates that the colony of Guadeloupe "(...) shall be governed, like Martinique (...) by the same laws in force in 1789" and tasks Denis Decrès, Minister of the Navy and Colonies, with reinstating slavery in Guadeloupe. It was presented to the public for the first time in 2021 during an exhibition for the bicentennial of Napoleon’s death.

=== French Guiana ===
==== Progressive reinstatement ====
In French Guiana, the reinstatement of slavery by Napoleon was enacted through a consular decree of 7 December 1802, supplemented locally by Victor Hugues in a circular of 29 May 1803.

In theory, the law of 20 May 1802, which reinstated the slave trade and maintained slavery in the colonies where the 1794 abolition could not be applied (Martinique, Tobago, Saint Lucia, Réunion, and Isle de France), did not apply to French Guiana. However, the intent to reinstate was real. In a letter from June 1802, the Minister of the Navy, Denis Decrès, ordered Governor Victor Hugues, who arrived in Guiana on 6 January 1800 and was known for his brutality, to consider all blacks arriving in Cayenne henceforth as slaves to revive the slave trade.

For his part, Victor Hugues eliminated wages paid by owners to free workers and forced the latter to remain in the plantations, under the control of district commissioners authorized to inflict punishments proportionate to offenses. In a letter of 12 October 1802, he confirmed to the Minister of the Navy that Slavery and the slave trade are necessary in the colony, arguing that The situation of these unfortunates is it then happier in Africa. He even mentioned a supposed famine that affected the newly freed due to abolition.

On 7 December 1802, the three consuls, Bonaparte, Cambacérès, and Lebrun, issued a decree formalizing the reinstatement of slavery in French Guiana. It stipulated that former slaves freed in 1794 be conscripted (irrevocably tied to the land where they worked), and those arriving later in the colony be subject to the provisions of the Code Noir of 1685.

In January 1803, Victor Hugues declared to the Minister of the Navy that he had reinstated slavery and destroyed bands of maroons in the districts of Approuague, Roura, Kourou, and Sinnamary, present there for 12 to 20 years. 173 of them were returned to their former masters with orders to chain them and assign them the hardest tasks. Others were confined in a penal colony, chained for periods ranging from three to twelve months, with Hugues deeming this measure preferable to their prosecution in courts.

Then, in a circular of 29 May 1803, he incorporated the conscripts into the regime of slaves and authorized their employers to sell them starting from 20 June 1804. He also required the freedmen of 1794 who had acquired property to reimburse their former owners the price of their freedom [...], failing which they would be returned to their last owners, along with the property they had acquired. Between 1803 and 1804, 357 cases of freedom repurchasing were recorded, with the procedure later suspended by Hugues until 1806 due to the high number of requests. This number is negligible compared to the 12,000 to 13,000 people (including 25% children) returned to slavery. Regarding black men enlisted in military battalions, 200 of them obtained their freedom after eight years of service, provided they re-enlisted for an equivalent period. The others were destined for rural conscription.

The slave trade was also revived. On 18 January 1804, Victor Hugues even organized an expedition to restore the connection between Guiana and the slave trade post of Gorée. From 1803 to 1808, 1,311 captives were re-imported (854 in 1806 alone).

==== Reassessment of the status of “former freedmen” ====
The free people of color were slaves who had been freed before the Revolution. Numbering about 500 (4% of the population), they also saw their status challenged. Victor Hugues required them to produce their individual emancipation certificate within one month, failing which they were integrated into the district conscription. He also prohibited them from wandering, renting housing in the city, peddling goods, bearing white surnames, using the titles of citizen or mister, or preparing or selling remedies.

==== Resumption of marronage ====
A portion of the black population, between 2,000 and 3,000 people, refused the return of slavery and fled into the forests, sometimes far away, thus depriving the Guianese economy, already affected by France’s difficulties, of labor. These individuals took the name of maroons and settled along the banks of a river that would later be called Maroni, where, in the 20th century, the department’s second-largest city, Saint-Laurent-du-Maroni, would grow. Their escape was facilitated by the fact that Guiana is not an island but the coastal part of a vast continental forest, where other communities of maroon Blacks, originating from the neighboring Dutch Guiana colony, existed and were sometimes more or less discreetly tolerated.

=== Hispaniola and Saint-Domingue ===
Since 1795, the entire island of Hispaniola has been under French control, with the colony of Saint-Domingue (now Haiti) on one side and the eastern part (now the Dominican Republic) on the other. On the island, the abolition of slavery had been achieved following the slave revolts that erupted in 1791. A first local abolition decree applied from 1793 in the northern part, then the decree of 4 February 1794 generalized abolition to all French colonies.

In this wealthy West Indian colony, First Consul Bonaparte also attempted to reinstate slavery. On 14 June 1802, his Minister of the Navy and Colonies, Denis Decrès, sent secret instructions to General Leclerc, then in the midst of the expedition on the island to restore metropolitan authority, to reinstate the pre-1789 slavery conditions and encourage the resumption of the slave trade. However, this project faced resistance from insurgents, leading to the colony’s independence in 1804.

Historians are divided on the precise date when Napoleon decided to reinstate slavery in Saint-Domingue. Most believe that First Consul Bonaparte already had this project in mind when he decided to send the Leclerc expedition in December 1801. In a statement to the Council of State on 1 August 1800, First Consul Napoleon Bonaparte gave an initial indication regarding the situation in the Spanish part of the island, under French control since 1795: I will confirm slavery in the Isle de France, as well as in the slave part of Saint-Domingue. However, according to historian Philippe Girard, the decision to reinstate slavery in the western part came after the expeditionary force’s departure. This is evidenced, according to him, by the pro-abolitionist statements Bonaparte made regarding the specific case of Saint-Domingue. The first occurred on 25 December 1799 in the Constitution authorizing a distinct regime for the colonies, adopted a few days after the coup d’état that brought him to power. He declared that the sacred principles of liberty and equality for blacks will never suffer any infringement or modification among you, then repeated the same promise, publicly or privately, in May 1800, January 1801, and March 1801.

Ultimately, in December 1801, the expeditionary army was assembled and, far from being limited to colonists and émigrés, was largely drawn from the Army of the Rhine. Napoleon, against the advice of Denis Decrès, insisted that it include dozens of black and mulatto officers such as Antoine Chanlatte, Belley, Léveillé, and Rigaud. After landing near Cap-Français in February 1802, Toussaint Louverture immediately accused Leclerc of coming to reinstate slavery, but the latter responded with posters, in his name and Bonaparte’s, promising to maintain abolition.

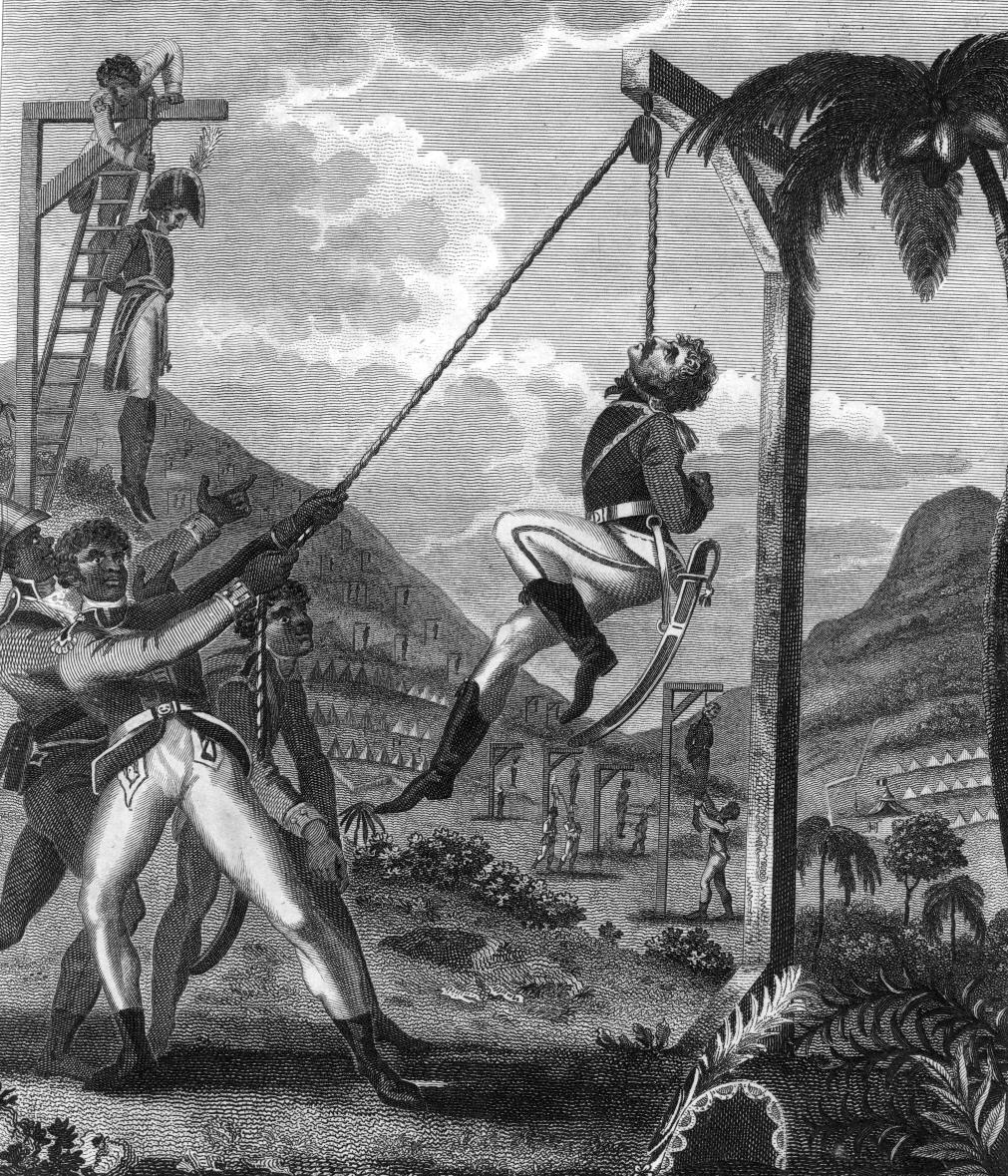
Execution of French officers captured by insurgents in 1803.

When Leclerc received the government’s secret instructions to reinstate slavery and the slave trade, he chose to temporize. Indeed, he knew that the black generals who had rallied to him would not have hesitated to switch sides if he reneged on his commitments. He therefore estimated that the reinstatement of slavery could occur, but later: at the time of my departure, the colony will be ready to receive the regime you wish to impose, but it will be up to my successor to take the final step if you deem it appropriate. I will do nothing contrary to what I have printed here. To try to settle the issue and reassure the insurgents, Leclerc personally drafted a proposed status for Saint-Domingue’s cultivators. And to a French general requesting a supply of chains, he promptly replied that one must never speak of chains in the colony. That word alone terrifies the blacks. His greatest fear was that Paris would make public decisions contrary to his own promises. The news of the maintenance of slavery in the Republic, through the law of 20 May 1802, followed by the reinstatement imposed in Guadeloupe by Richepance and confirmed by the July 1802 decree, generated a sense of betrayal and strengthened the local fight against the Saint-Domingue expedition. On 6 August 1802, Leclerc expressed his dismay to Bonaparte: "The moral authority I had gained here is destroyed… now, Citizen Consul, that your plans for the colonies are perfectly known."

At the same time in 1802, in the eastern part of the island, still under French occupation, slavery was reinstated by General Jean-Louis Ferrand

The alliance of the mulatto and black troops of Pétion and Dessalines ultimately determined the failure of this expedition, and the colony’s evolution toward independence, which became effective on 1 January 1804.

=== Réunion and Isle de France ===
In Réunion, unlike the West Indies, the slave system was established over the first decades of the 18th century on modestly sized estates. In 1793, it had 35,000 slaves, and by 1825, around 71,000, leading to estimates of about 50,000 slaves in 1811, when the Saint-Leu slave revolt occurred in the capital of Bourbon coffee, which was suppressed by local French colonists.

In the Mascarenes, the first colonists Napoleon met were representatives of the economic and financial lobby. In France, Jean-Jacques Serres, deputy for Isle de France from 1793 to 1795, before becoming sub-prefect of the arrondissement of Alès from 1800 to 1815, warned him that he would face the same situation in the Mascarenes as in Saint-Domingue if he did not heed this lobby.

As early as March 1801, even as he promised not to reinstate slavery in Saint-Domingue to appease Toussaint Louverture, Napoleon decided to maintain the institution in Réunion, giving assurances to white planters there that he would never issue an abolition decree affecting the colony. The constitution established by Napoleon in 1799 no longer allowed colonial representation in Paris, and Réunion was the farthest for mail exchanges, but in early 1802, correspondence arrived in Paris from the Réunion Assembly, reiterating that if the decree were imposed on the colony, it could switch to the British. Hence, a special mention for the Mascarenes in the law of 20 May 1802, in the form of an addendum stipulating that the situation would remain as before 1789. In exchange for his commitment to the landowners of the Mascarenes that slavery would be recognized in Réunion, Napoleon imposed in the law of 24 March 1803 the abolition of this local colonial assembly as well as local courts.

== Debates ==
The reinstatement of slavery by Napoleon has been the subject of numerous debates and controversies in 2021, during the official commemoration of the bicentennial of the Emperor’s death, though these discussions had been ongoing for about fifteen years.

The fact that France was the only country in the world to have reinstated slavery after its abolition led historian Arthur Chevallier, curator of the “Napoleon” exhibition, interviewed in March 2021 on France Inter, to describe it as a double crime, triple crime. President of the Republic Emmanuel Macron saw it more simply as a fault, a betrayal of the Enlightenment spirit, as this reinstatement contradicted one of the fundamental principles of the Revolution, which proclaimed equality among men, even though the archives of the reinstatement of slavery were only shown to the public for the first time in March 2021, during an exhibition.

The writer of West Indian origin Claude Ribbe had, like historian Arthur Chevallier, spoken as early as 2005 of a “Crime of Napoleon” in the form of a pamphlet entirely dedicated to it, Napoleon's Crimes. This book, printed in 35,000 copies, translated in Brazil, China, and South Korea, saw its first edition sell out by 2006 and was criticized by historians specializing in the period, who considered it more a pamphlet than a history book. Through a provocative photo, the cover of the first edition, removed from subsequent editions to avoid controversy, referenced the visit of Hitler, who came to Paris at the Invalides to pay respects at the Emperor’s tomb, to “return” to France the ashes of the Aiglon. Historian and academic Pierre Nora, also doubly involved in the Olivier Grenouilleau Affair, as both the publisher of Olivier Grenouilleau and the organizer of the petition defending him, saw it as a “headless and tailless pamphlet”.

== Timeline ==
- 4 April 1792: Decree of 4 April 1792 establishing equality between Whites and Free people of color;
- 19 February 1793: Whitehall Accord between Great Britain and French colonists in the West Indies;
- 29 August 1793: Decree by Civil Commissioner Sonthonax abolishing slavery in the northern part of Saint-Domingue;
- 16 September 1793: royalist insurrection in Martinique;
- 21 September 1793: Abolition of slavery by Civil Commissioner Polverel in the West and South of Saint-Domingue “on the sole condition of committing to continue working on the plantations";
- 4 February 1794: Decree officially abolishing slavery in all French colonies;
- 6 February 1794 to 21 March 1794: The British conquer Martinique;
- 22 July 1795: Treaty of Basel, Spain cedes to France the east of Saint-Domingue;
- 30 March 1798: Franco-British armistice in Saint-Domingue;
- 13 June 1799: Tripartite commercial convention of 1799 between Americans, British, and Toussaint Louverture;
- 9 November 1799: Napoleon Bonaparte seizes power through a coup d’état;
- 1 August 1800: Statement to the Council of State by First Consul Napoleon Bonaparte: I will confirm slavery in the Isle de France, as well as in the slave part of Saint-Domingue;
- 18 November 1801: Letters from Napoleon to Saint-Domingue promising to maintain abolition;
- 3 February 1802: The Saint-Domingue expedition arrives off Cap-Français;
- 25 March 1802: Peace of Amiens with the British, France abandons Naples, Rome, and fishing rights but recovers Martinique;
- 20 May 1802: law reauthorizing slavery where abolition could not be applied;
- 6 May 1802: Toussaint Louverture signs a ceasefire;
- 7 June 1802: Toussaint Louverture deported to France;
- 14 June 1802: Secret instructions sent to General Leclerc, then in the midst of the Saint-Domingue expedition, to reinstate the pre-1789 slavery conditions and encourage the resumption of the slave trade;
- 16 July 1802: Decree reinstating slavery in Guadeloupe;
- 2 July 1802: Consular decree renewing (except with special authorization from local administrators) the ban on French territory imposed in 1763 and 1777 against people of color (and slaves);
- 6 August 1802: General Leclerc expresses his dismay to Bonaparte, now that his plans to reinstate slavery in Saint-Domingue are perfectly known;
- 1 November 1802: Death of Leclerc, commander of the Saint-Domingue expedition, replaced by Rochambeau;
- 7 December 1802: Decree reinstating slavery in French Guiana;
- 8 January 1803: Circular to prefects, prohibiting mixed marriages in France;
- 24 April 1803: In French Guiana, local decree by Victor Hugues supplementing that of 7 December;
- 18 November 1803: Final defeat of the Saint-Domingue expedition at the Battle of Vertières;

== See also ==
- End of slavery in France
- History of slavery
- Atlantic slave trade
- Triangular trade
- Anti-rights movements
- Decree of the Abolition of Slavery of April 27, 1848

== Bibliography ==
- Saugera, Éric (2002) [1995]. Bordeaux port négrier [Bordeaux, slave trade port] (23.6 x 15.6 x 3.2 cm) (in French). Biarritz/Paris: Karthala. p. 382. ISBN 2-86537-584-6.
- Branda, Pierre; Lentz, Thierry (2006). Napoléon, l'esclavage et les colonies [Napoleon, slavery, and the colonies] (in French). Fayard. p. 374. ISBN 2213629870.
- Benot, Yves (2006) [1992]. La démence coloniale sous Napoléon [The colonial madness under Napoleon] (in French). La Découverte. p. 420. ISBN 2707148792.
- Ribbe, Claude (2013) [2005]. Le Crime de Napoléon [Napoleon' Crimes] (in French). Le Cherche midi. p. 192. ISBN 978-2350760124.
- Régent, Frédéric; Niort, Jean-François; Serna, Pierre (2019). Les colonies, la Révolution française, la loi [The colonies, the French Revolution, the law] (in French). Presses universitaires de Rennes. p. 304. ISBN 978-2-7535-5963-9.
- Girard, Philippe R. (2021). Ces esclaves qui ont vaincu Napoléon: Toussaint Louverture et la guerre d'indépendance haïtienne [Those slaves who defeated Napoleon: Toussaint Louverture and the Haiti independence war] (in French). Atlantide. p. 478. ISBN 978-2371250451.
- Taffin, Dominique (April 2021). "Napoléon colonial: 1802, rétablissement de l'esclavage" [Colonial Napoleon: 1802, reinstatement of slavery] (PDF). Les Notes de la FME (in French) (2).
