= Decree of 29 March 1815 =

French decree abolishing slavery

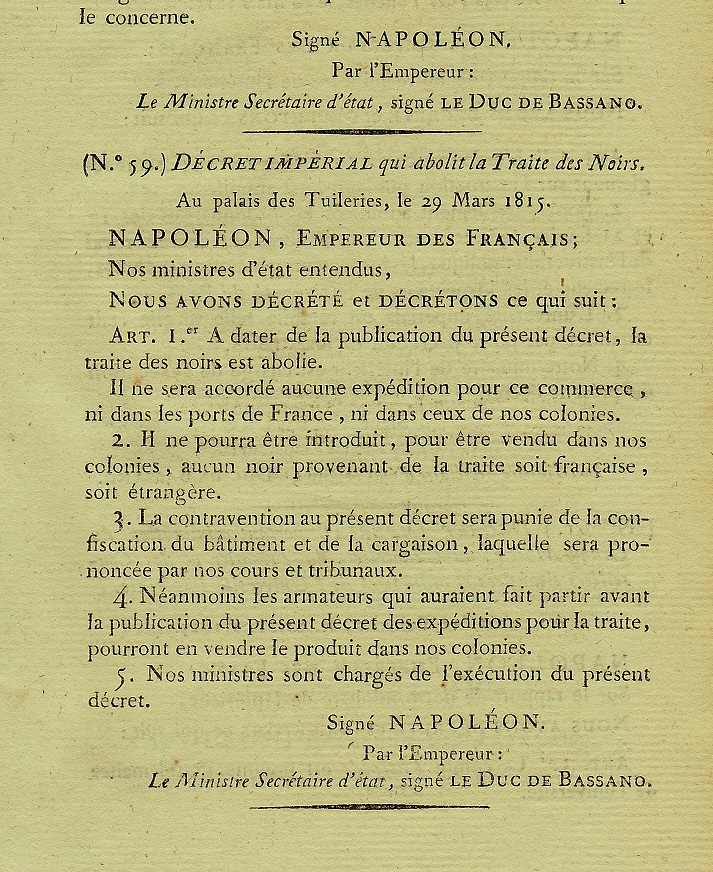
- Long title: Imperial Decree Abolishing the Slave Trade
- Territorial extent: France

The Decree of 29 March 1815 was issued by Emperor Napoleon I, who had previously re-established slavery in Guadeloupe and Guyana and maintained it in Martinique, abolished the "slave trade". This action followed the commitment of European nations at the Congress of Vienna in February 1815, prompted by pressure from Britain, which controlled the seas and had prohibited the slave trade since 1807.: The decree prohibited the introduction of "any Black person resulting from the slave trade, whether French or foreign" for sale in French colonies. However, this decree did not abolish slavery, which continued until 1848.

== Content ==
The decree comprises five articles

Article 1. Upon publication of this decree, the slave trade is abolished. No expedition for this trade will be permitted in the ports of France or its colonies.

Article 2. No Black person resulting from the slave trade, whether French or foreign, may be introduced for sale in French colonies.

Article 3. Violations of this decree will result in the confiscation of the vessel and its cargo, as determined by French courts and tribunals.

Article 4. Shipowners who dispatched expeditions for the slave trade before the decree’s publication may sell their cargo in French colonies.

Article 5. Ministers are tasked with enforcing this decree.

== Context ==
=== Re-establishment of slavery ===
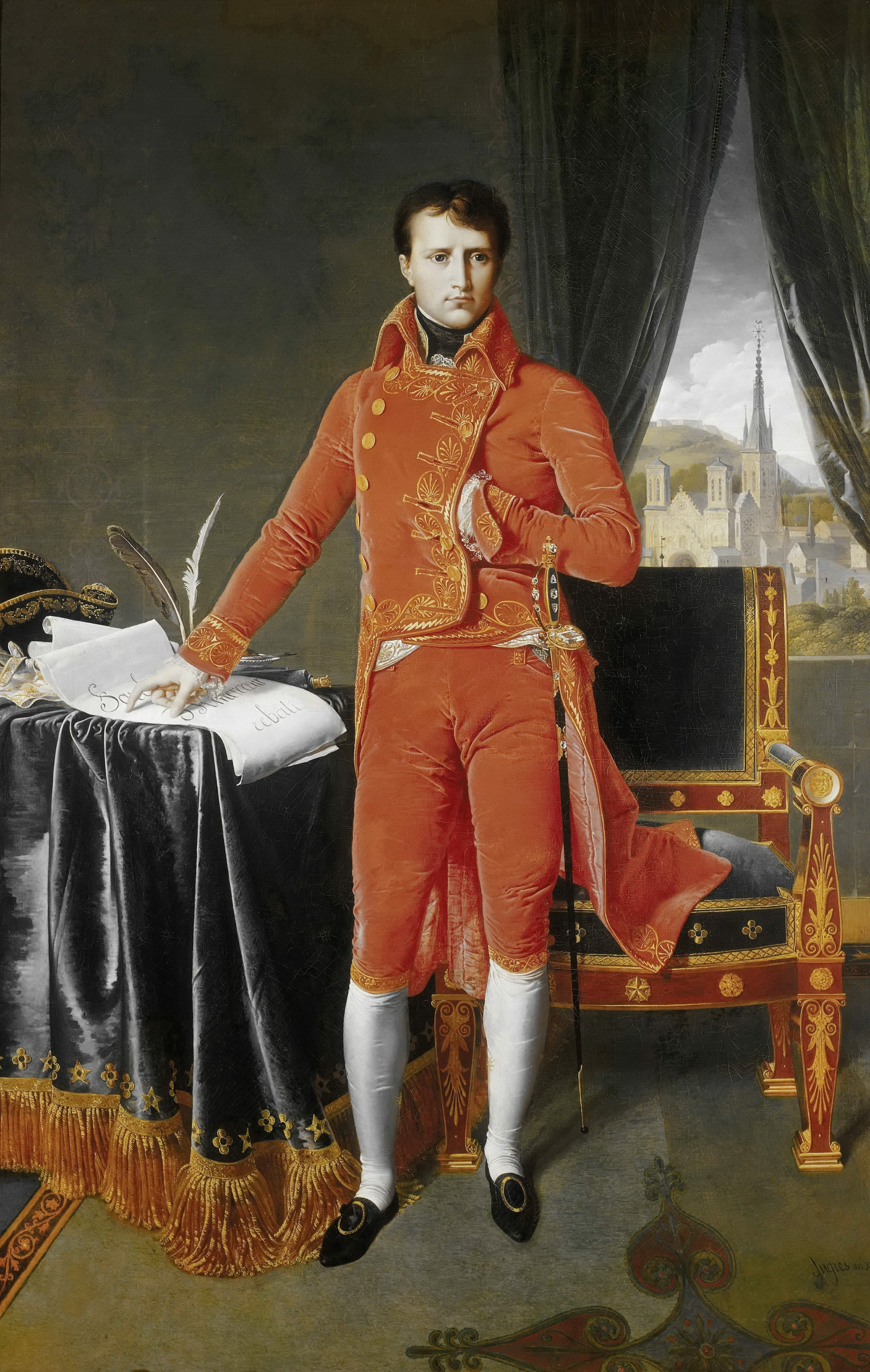
Bonaparte, First Consul, by Jean-Auguste-Dominique Ingres.

Slavery in French colonies was initially abolished during the French Revolution by the Montagnard Convention through the law of 4 February 1794. However, under the Consulate, with Napoleon Bonaparte as First Consul holding full authority, the Law on the slave trade and the regime of the colonies of 20 May 1802 maintained slavery in colonies where the 1794 abolition had not been implemented due to British occupation or resistance from colonists (Martinique, Tobago, Saint Lucia, Bourbon, and Isle de France).

In a letter dated 14 June 1802, Napoleon’s Minister of the Navy, Denis Decrès, instructed General Leclerc, commander of the Saint-Domingue expedition, to re-establish slavery in the colony.

Subsequently, the consular decree of 16 July 1802 re-established slavery in Guadeloupe and repealed both the 1794 abolition decree and the law of 1792 granting equal rights to Free People of Color.

For Guyana, a consular decree of 7 December 1802 re-established slavery.

=== Napoleon’s policies ===
==== Political considerations ====
Some historians attribute Bonaparte’s policy shift in 1801 to the influence of the slaveholding lobby, driven by political and economic considerations.

According to Jean-Joël Brégeon, Napoleon was initially opposed to re-establishing slavery. He considered a transitional status tailored to each colony. However, the insurrection in Saint-Domingue necessitated restoring order, and a significant “Creole faction” advocated for the return of slaves to plantations.

Historian Jean-François Niort notes: “Influenced by the slaveholding lobby, Bonaparte believed that Guadeloupe was in chaos – which was untrue – and that restoring order required re-establishing slavery.”

In practice, the abolition law had limited impact due to the near-total loss of colonies following the war with England and the Haitian Revolution. From 1804 to 1814, during his reign as emperor, Napoleon shifted focus away from the issue of slavery.

==== Segregationist policies ====
In 1799, following his coup d'état, First Consul Bonaparte stated to the Council of State, referencing the 1794 abolition and the British occupation of Martinique at the colonists’ request: “If I had been in Martinique, I would have supported the British, as one’s life must come first. I support the Whites because I am white; that reason suffices. How could freedom have been granted to Africans, to people without civilization, who did not even understand what a colony or France was? If the majority of the Convention had understood its actions and the colonies, would it have granted freedom to the Blacks? Certainly not.”

After maintaining or re-establishing slavery in 1802, Bonaparte suppressed colonial revolts in Guadeloupe and Saint-Domingue. He also implemented a policy of segregation and discrimination against free people of color, which was stricter than under the Ancien Régime. In mainland France, the consular decree of 2 July 1802 (13 Messidor Year X) reinstated a prohibition on free people of color and slaves entering French territory, as previously enacted in 1763 and 1777.

The Civil Code was amended to establish a racial hierarchy, categorizing Whites, free people of color from before 1789, and slaves. Additionally, mixed-race marriages were prohibited, fulfilling a longstanding demand from the colonial lobby that the Ancien Régime had rejected.

=== Treaty of Paris and Congress of Vienna ===
Several historically slaveholding powers began to reconsider their positions. Notably, Britain abolished the slave trade in 1807, though full abolition of slavery was deferred.

In 1814, the Allies invaded France, forcing Napoleon’s abdication. At Britain’s initiative, an article in the Treaty of Paris of 30 May 1814 stipulated that France prohibit the slave trade within five years, by 1819.

On 15 June 1814, King Louis XVIII affirmed that the French delegation would support Britain’s stance at the Congress of Vienna, commencing on 18 September 1814.

However, this commitment had limited impact. French diplomats Talleyrand and Jaucourt delayed action, prioritizing the recovery of French colonies. Other nations, such as Spain and Portugal, also resisted abolishing the slave trade.

Consequently, the Congress of Vienna issued a declaration on 8 February 1815 condemning the “slave trade of African Blacks” without mandating its immediate cessation.

=== Promulgation ===
Upon returning from exile on the Island of Elba during the Hundred Days, Napoleon issued the decree of 29 March 1815, prohibiting the slave trade and the sale of slaves.

According to Thierry Lentz, director of the Fondation Napoléon, which promotes Napoleonic heritage: “Napoleon was aware of the discussions at the Congress of Vienna, including a commission preparing the abolition of the slave trade. He sought to preempt these efforts and demonstrate a more progressive stance.”

Johanne Vernier notes that Napoleon’s decree responded to British pressure, as Britain had prohibited the slave trade since 1807, controlled maritime routes, and enforced rights of search of foreign ships.

== Scope and limitations ==
On 18 June 1815, Napoleon’s defeat at the Battle of Waterloo led to his second abdication on 22 June, with Louis XVIII restored to the throne on 8 July.

Despite the limited impact of Napoleon’s decree, Bonapartist scholar Thierry Choffat argues that “Napoleon’s decree set France on a path toward reform, marking a step toward the abolition of slavery in 1848.” However, during the Second Restoration, all acts of the “usurper” were deemed null.

The royal ordinance of 8 January 1817 by Louis XVIII prohibited the introduction of slaves into French colonies, and the Law of 15 April 1818 formally abolished the slave trade, though enforcement was weak. The illegal slave trade was often framed as resistance to British efforts to undermine the French economy.

Historians Bruno Marnot and Thierry Sauzeau note that the French prohibition faced challenges due to the demand for slaves in remaining colonial plantations, despite the loss of Saint-Domingue. They highlight a “deliberate oversight of strategies used by slave traders to evade ship confiscation.” Enforcement strengthened after 1822 with the appointment of the Marquis de Clermont-Tonnerre as Minister of the Navy. In 1825, the Court of Cassation ordered the prosecution of slave traders, followed by the law of 1827 classifying slave traders as criminals. Serge Daget documents 729 confirmed, suspected, or questionable French slave trade expeditions between 1814 and 1850.

== Bibliography ==
- RÉPERTOIRE GÉNÉRAL : jurisprudence de 1791 à 1850 l'histoire du droit, législation et la doctrine des auteurs, volume 12 [GENERAL REPERTORY: Jurisprudence from 1791 to 1850, Legal History, Legislation, and Doctrine of Authors, Volume 12] (in French). Bureau du Journal du Palais. 1815.
- Legraverend, Jean-Marie Emmanuel; Duvergier, Jean Baptiste Henri (1830). Traité de la législation criminelle [Treatise on Criminal Legislation] (in French). Mme Ve. Charles-Bechet.
- Durat-Lasalle, Louis (1842). Droit et législation des armées de terre et de mer, recueil méthodique complet des lois, etc [Law and Legislation of Land and Sea Armies, Complete Methodical Collection of Laws, etc.] (in French).
- L'Abbé Grégoire - Conférence donnée à la Grande Loge de France [Abbé Grégoire - Conference Given at the Grand Lodge of France] (in French). Société des amis du Président Gaston Monnerville. 1981-05-05.
- Lentz, Thierry (2015). Le congrès de Vienne [The Congress of Vienna] (in French). Perrin. ISBN 978-2-262-06414-3.
- Vernier, Johanne (2012). Traite des êtres humains et traite des migrants [Human Trafficking and Migrant Trafficking] (PDF) (in French). Archived from the original (PDF) on 2016-10-13.
