= Law of 20 May 1802 =

Law reinstating slavery in the French colonial empire

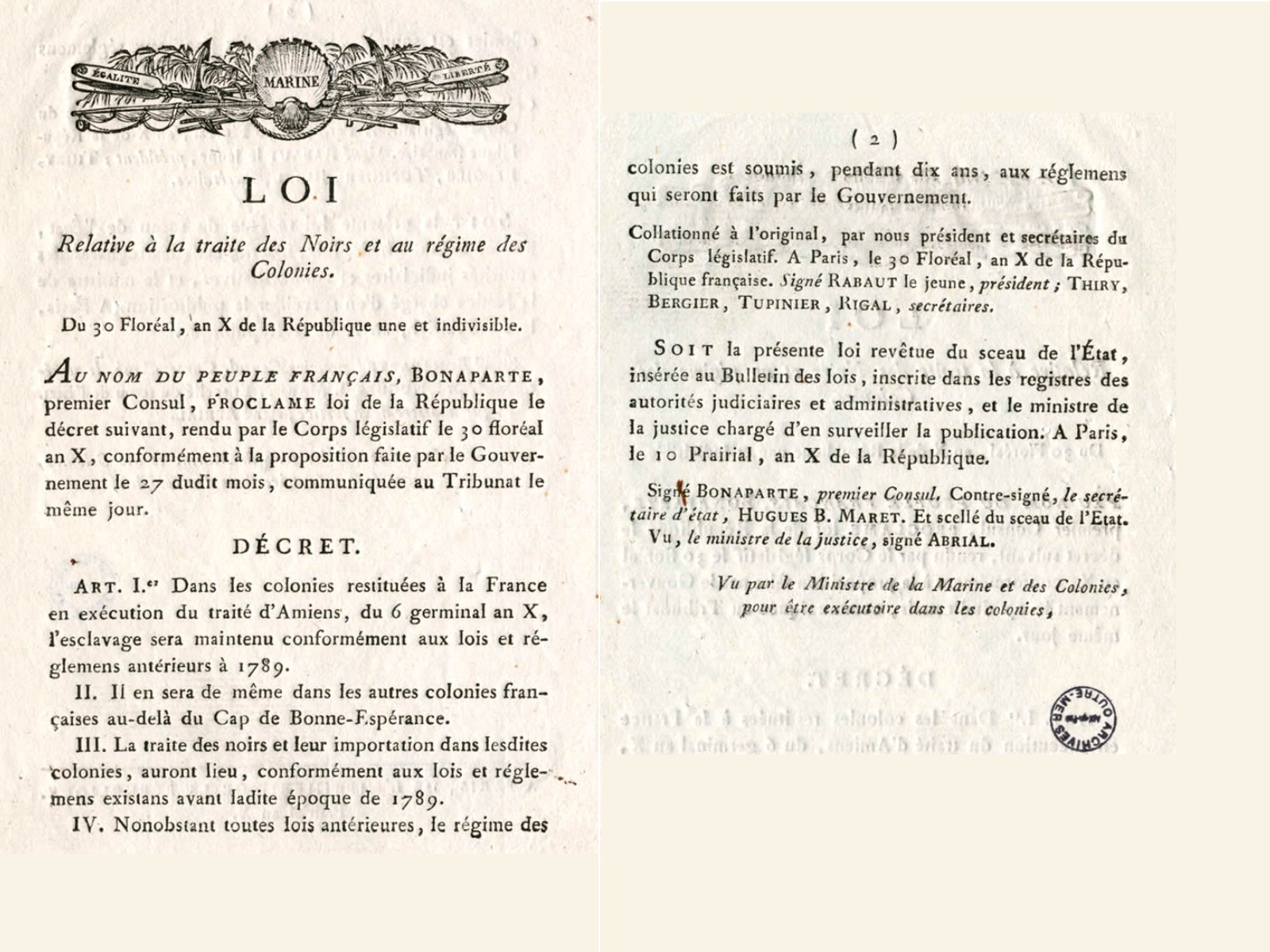
The text of the decree

The Law of 20 May 1802 (Loi du 30 floréal an X) was a decree passed by First Consul Napoleon of the French First Republic on 20 May 1802 that reinstated slavery. It decreed the reinstatement and continuation of slavery in French colonies, reversing the Law of 4 February 1794, which had abolished the institution in all of France's overseas possessions but was only implemented in Saint-Domingue, Guadeloupe and Cayenne.

French colonial authorities in Isle de France and Réunion refused to abolish slavery due to opposition from local colonists, while Martinique refused to ratify it due to a royalist insurrection in the colony which began on 16 September 1793 and resulted in Martinican planter Louis-François Dubuc signing the Whitehall Accord with Great Britain in 1794. On 5 February 1794, the British began an invasion of Martinique and established full control over the island by 24 March, and thus the colony, like British-occupied Tobago and Saint Lucia, remained unaffected by the 1794 decree.

The Law of 20 May 1802 explicitly concerned the colonies which had not implemented the Law of 4 February 1794: it was linked to the Treaty of Amiens of 26 March 1802, which returned Martinique, Tobago and Saint Lucia to France. Consequently, it did not apply to Saint-Domingue, Guadeloupe or Cayenne. The reestablishment of slavery in Guadeloupe was formalized by another legislative measure, a consular decree passed on 16 July 1802. The decree discreetly charged Denis Decrès, then Minister of the Navy and the Colonies, with restoring slavery in Guadeloupe. However, the French did not officially reestablish slavery in the colony until 14 May 1803.

In Cayenne, slavery was restored by a consular decree on 7 December 1802, followed by a local decree by Victor Hugues of 24 April 1803 which officially reestablished slavery. The Law of 20 May 1802 had no effect in Saint-Domingue where slavery had been abolished by the 1793 Sonthonax and Polverel proclamation [fr].

Napoleon's attempts to restore French control and slavery in Saint-Domingue proved futile. This law united opposition to Napoleon's brother-in-law, General Charles Leclerc (commander of the Saint-Domingue expedition), who failed in his attempts to restore French control and slavery in Saint-Domingue.

== See also ==
- Reinstatement of slavery by Napoleon Bonaparte
