= Victor Hugues =

French politician and colonial administrator (1762–1826)

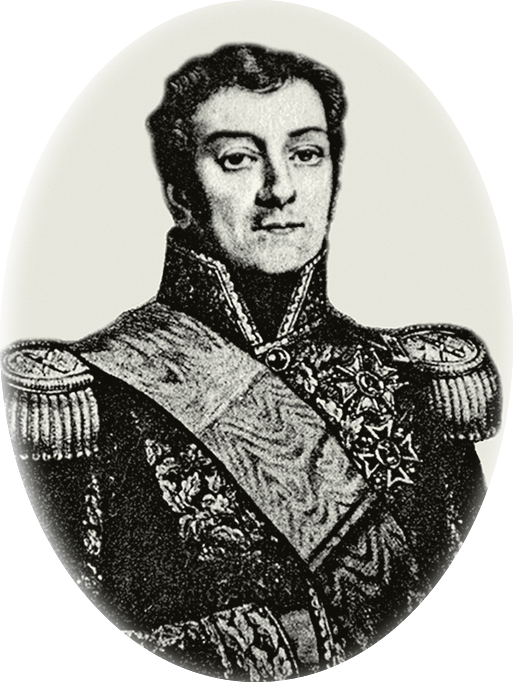
Portrait of Hugues

Jean-Baptiste Victor Hugues (July 20, 1762 – August 12, 1826) was a French politician and colonial administrator who served as the governor of Guadeloupe from 1794 to 1798. He is best known for his actions during the French Revolutionary Wars, where Hugues played a major role in implementing the Law of 4 February 1794 which abolished slavery in French colonies. In 1799, Napoleon rose to power in France, and attempted to restore slavery in French colonies. Hugues, who had been personally opposed to abolition, oversaw in the restoration of slavery in Cayenne, where he purchased several slaves for himself. In 1809, Anglo-Portuguese forces captured Cayenne, with Hugues being disgraced upon his return to France. He returned to Cayenne and died there in 1826.

== Early life ==
Jean-Baptiste Victor Hugues was born on 20 July 1762 in Marseille into a wealthy family. His father, Jean-François Hugues, was a merchant, and Hugues's mother Catherine Fodrin was born into family of silk traders from Saint-Étienne. Hugues moved along with his family to the French colony of Saint-Domingue during the early 1780s, where he eventually acquired ownership of a number of slave plantations. During the 1790s, Hugues was forced to return to France as a result of the Haitian Revolution. There, he was appointed as prosecutor of the Committee of Public Safety in La Rochelle with the support of the city's branch of the Jacobin Club. In 1794, he was appointed as the governor of Guadeloupe by the National Convention, which had voted to abolish slavery in all French colonies on 4 February of that year.

== Governor of Guadeloupe ==
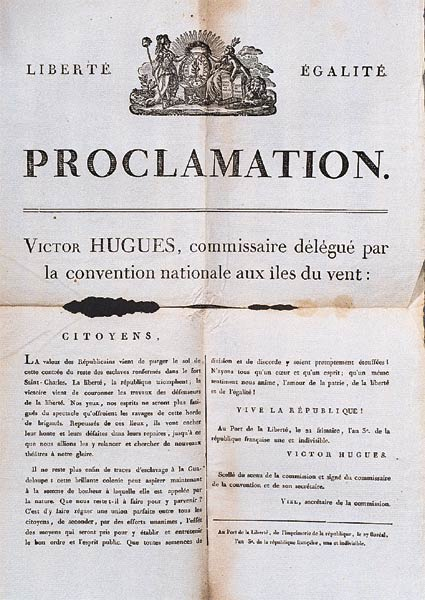
A proclamation issued by Hugues abolishing slavery in Guadeloupe

In 1793, counter-revolutionary French royalists signed the Whitehall Accord with Britain, pledging to place their colonies under British protection. A British expeditionary force occupied Guadeloupe in April 1794, and Hugues arrived at the colony on 2 June with 1,150 French troops. He immediately declared the abolition of slavery on Guadeloupe, which quickly led to most of the island's Black population, both free and enslaved, coming over to his side. Hugues's forces soon captured Pointe-à-Pitre from the British, and scored a major victory on 6 October when he forced a British force of 800 white royalists and 900 Black soldiers to surrender at their camp in Barville. By 10 December, all British forces had left the island.

Hugues supported abolition as a mean to reconquer Guadeloupe from the British, but remained staunchly racist and pro-slavery. Even though he abolished slavery in Guadeloupe, Hugues maintained a system of forced labour in the colony. Hugues also reorganised the military forces of Guadeloupe, recruited a large number of newly emancipated people until Hugues had a force of 10,000 men under his command. This force consisted of racially integrated units where Black people were allowed to serve as officers, a rarity for the era. Hugues also purged all alleged counter-revolutionaries from the colony by executing them using a guillotine brought from France, and devoted significant efforts to establish a successful economy in Guadeloupe which would continue to export cash crops grown on local plantations to Europe.

During his tenure as governor, Hugues authorised privateers operating out of Guadeloupe to attack British and American merchant shipping, which contributed to stabilising the colony's finances but also led to the outbreak of the Quasi-War between France and the United States. He also made several attempts to invade nearby islands under British control, with mixed results. On 18 April 1795, Hugues landed in British-held Saint Lucia with 600 soldiers and joined forces with 250 white French republicans and 300 Black republicans; the latter were mostly equipped with pikes but some carried muskets captured from the island's British garrison. In response, the British landed over 1,000 troops from Castries at Vieux Fort who marched overland to Soufrière. On April 22, the British attacked Hugues' troops at Fond Doux and Rabot, though after intense fighting they were eventually forced to withdraw back to Castries. By June, all British forces in Saint Lucia withdrew from the colony along with numerous French Royalists, whose slaves were freed by Hugues. However, in April 1796 the British invaded Saint Lucia again and recaptured the colony by May. In 1796, he led a failed attempt to capture Anguilla from the British. On 22 November 1798, Hugues was replaced as governor of Guadeloupe by Edme Étienne Borne Desfourneaux, and returned to France.

== Cayenne ==
In 1799, the French Consulate sent Hugues as an official to Cayenne, who arrived there on January 6, 1800.

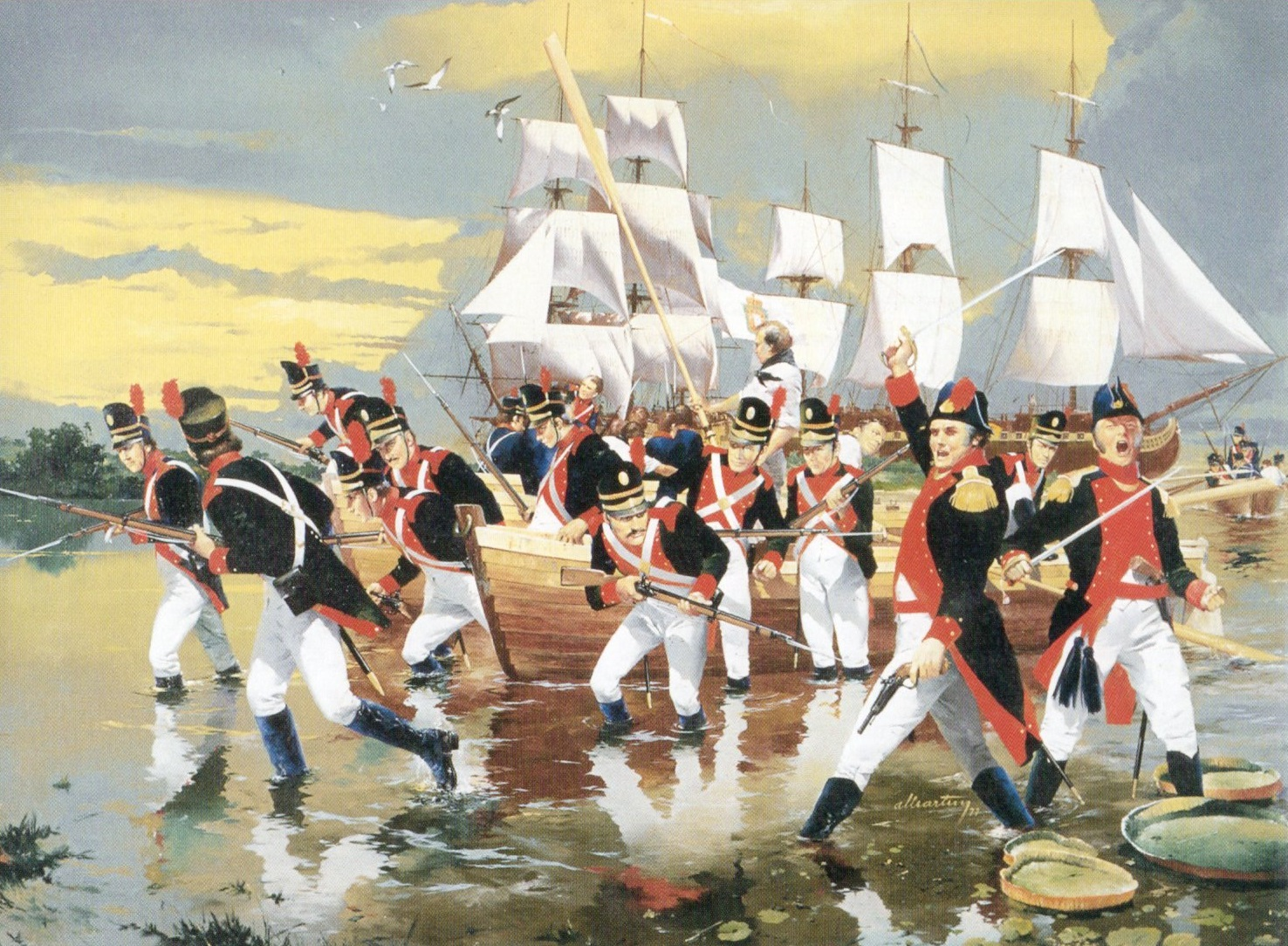
The Portuguese conquest of French Guiana, during which Hugues capitulated

The re-establishment of slavery was recommended to Hugues by the minister of the Marine Denis Decrès in June 1802, a proposition with which Hugues agreed. Hugues thought that the abolition of slavery was a misguided act that ultimately created more suffering than good. He took measures toward this goal before the official reinstauration of slavery in Cayenne; notably, by replacing salaries given to laborers with one or two change of clothings per year. Hugues also extended slavery to blacks brought as slaves before the abolition of slavery in a bulletin on May 29, 1803 (unlike the original consular decree, which gave them the status of "conscripted"/"tied to the land"). His 1803 Règles de cultures is characterised as "even more draconian than its predecessors". Hugues brutal methods ultimately allowed Cayenne to flourish economically, with the colony's exports being worth 1 063 949 francs in 1796-1801; 2 455 958 in 1802-1807; 1 510 000 in 1809 alone.

In December 1808, Portuguese and British forces landed in southern Cayenne, where Hugues' residence was situated. Without having fought, Hugues capitulated on the 12th January 1809. He embarked to France on a ship with 600 militarymen, and was prosecuted by a council of war for having surrendered to protect his personal interests. He was acquitted and "cast aside". In 1815, Hugues returned to Cayenne, where he spent his final years; first at Cayenne, then at his residence. Hugues continued to serve as an official before staying on after retiring as a private citizen.

== Legacy ==
Hugues had been featured in several works of historical fiction, including Cuban writer Alejo Carpentier's 1962 work Explosion in a Cathedral and American author James A. Michener's 1989 work The Caribbean.
