= Pierre Victor, baron Malouet =

French politician, colonial administrator and writer

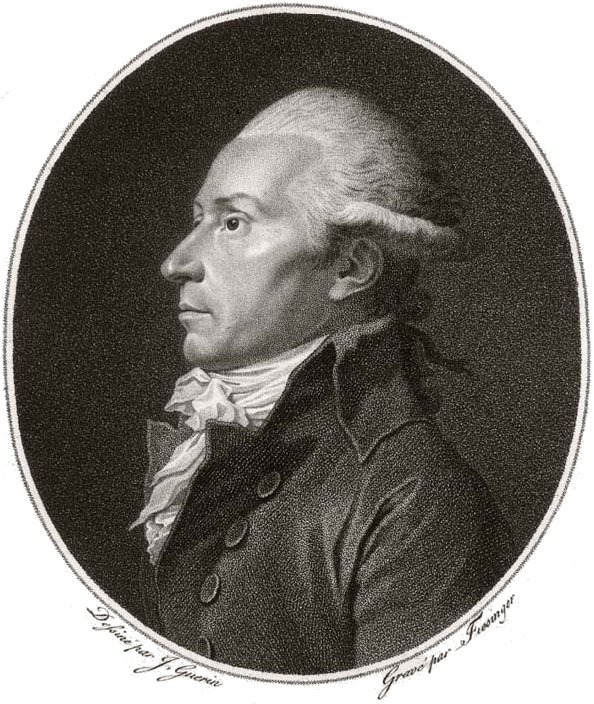
Pierre Victor, baron Malouet

Pierre Victor, baron Malouet (11 February 1740 – 7 September 1814) was a French politician, colonial administrator and writer. As an émigré, he signed the Whitehall Accord with Great Britain in 1794.

== Life ==
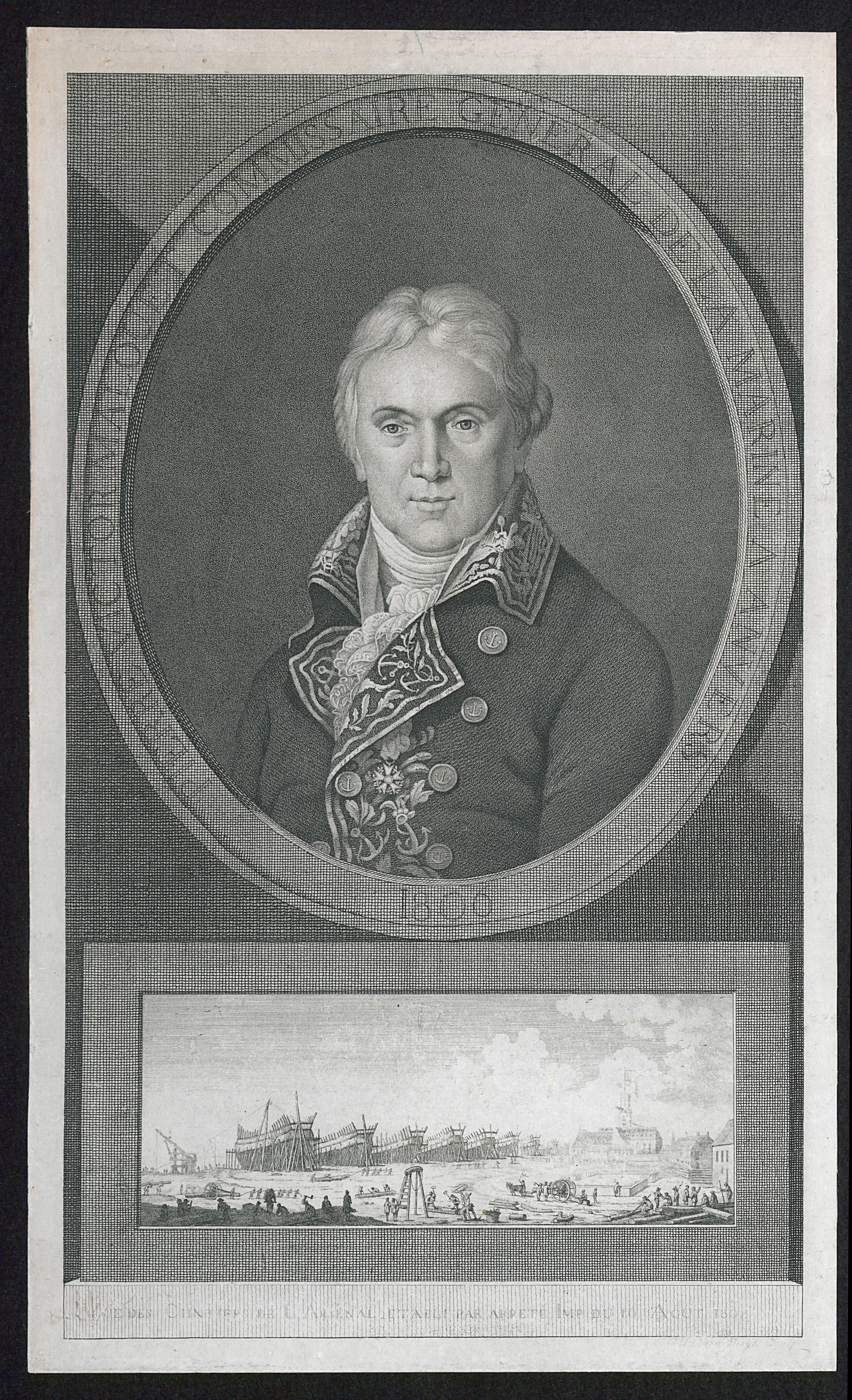
Portrait of Malouet

Malouet was born in Riom as the son of a bailli in Puy-de-Dôme. He was educated at the College of Juilly (1754–1756) before studying law. Then he opted for a career in the diplomatic service and in 1758 he was sent to the French Embassy in Lisbon and met with the Marquis de Pombal. When he returned to France he was given an administrative role in the French Royal Army under Victor François de Broglie, 2nd Duke of Broglie. In 1763 he was appointed intendant at Rochefort and became commissary in Saint-Domingue in 1767. There he married and acquired a significant number of sugar plantations. He returned to France in 1774, and took up the role of commissary-general of the navy. In 1776 he was entrusted to carry out plans of improving the colonization of French Guiana. The next year Malouet and his wife made a 7-week trip to Paramaribo, to discuss the 200 Maroon that had fled from Surinam to Guiana. Malouet criticized the way the Dutch treated their slaves after he had visited 26 plantations. To improve relations between the owners and the slaves, Malouet "promoted" religion. He was almost taken prisoner during the American Revolutionary War by a British privateer on his return to Cayenne.

Back in France he was well received at court, and the execution of his plans in Guiana was assured. Malouet was appointed intendant of the port of Toulon. In 1788 he published his Mémoire sur l'esclavage des négres opposing Abbé Raynal, who advocated the abolition of slavery. Malouet took a seat as representative of the Third Estate for his home town in the Estates General of 1789, where he soon became well known as a defender of the monarchy. In September 1792, after the besiege of the Tuileries palace, he emigrated to England and met with Edmund Burke. On behalf of Saint-Domingue he signed the Whitehall Accord, which placed the colony (along with Guadeloupe and Martinique) under the authority of the British Empire, whilst ensuring the profitability of the sugar plantations by overturning the recent Law of 4 February 1794. Around December 1792 he sought in vain permission to return to assist in the defence of Louis XVI.

After the Coup of 18 Brumaire he returned to France. In 1801 his name was erased from the list of émigrés by Napoleon; in 1803, after the Saint-Domingue expedition he was sent to Antwerp as commissioner-general and maritime prefect to supervise the erection of defence works, and the creation of a fleet. Malouet left the city in 1807. He was peered and entered the council of state for the navy in 1810. Having offended the emperor by his criticism of the campaign in Russia, he was disgraced and left office in 1812. At the Restoration, Louis XVIII made him Minister of the Navy, but Malouet died the same year. His memoires were published in 1868.

Malouet was the author of a lengthy prose poem with a nautical theme, Les quatre parties du jour à la mer, published in 1783.

== Works ==
- Collection de ses opinions à l'Assemblée Nationale (3 vols., 1791–1792)
- Collection de mémoires et correspondences officielles sur l'administration des colonies et notamment sur la Guerre française et hollandaise (5 vols. 1802)
- Mémoire sur l'esclavage des negres dans les possessions françaises (Paris, 1788)
- Examen de cette question: Quel sera pour les colonies de l'Amerique le resultat de la revolution française? (London, 1797).
- Les quatre parties du jour à la mer (Paris, 1783)

== Sources ==
- Wilson, J. G.; Fiske, J., eds. (1900). "Malouet, Pierre Victor, Baron" . Appletons' Cyclopædia of American Biography. New York: D. Appleton.

Attribution

Political offices
Preceded by Denis Decrès	Ministers of Marine and the Colonies; 3 April 1814 – 7 September 1814	Succeeded by Jacques, comte Beugnot
