= Thierry Lentz =

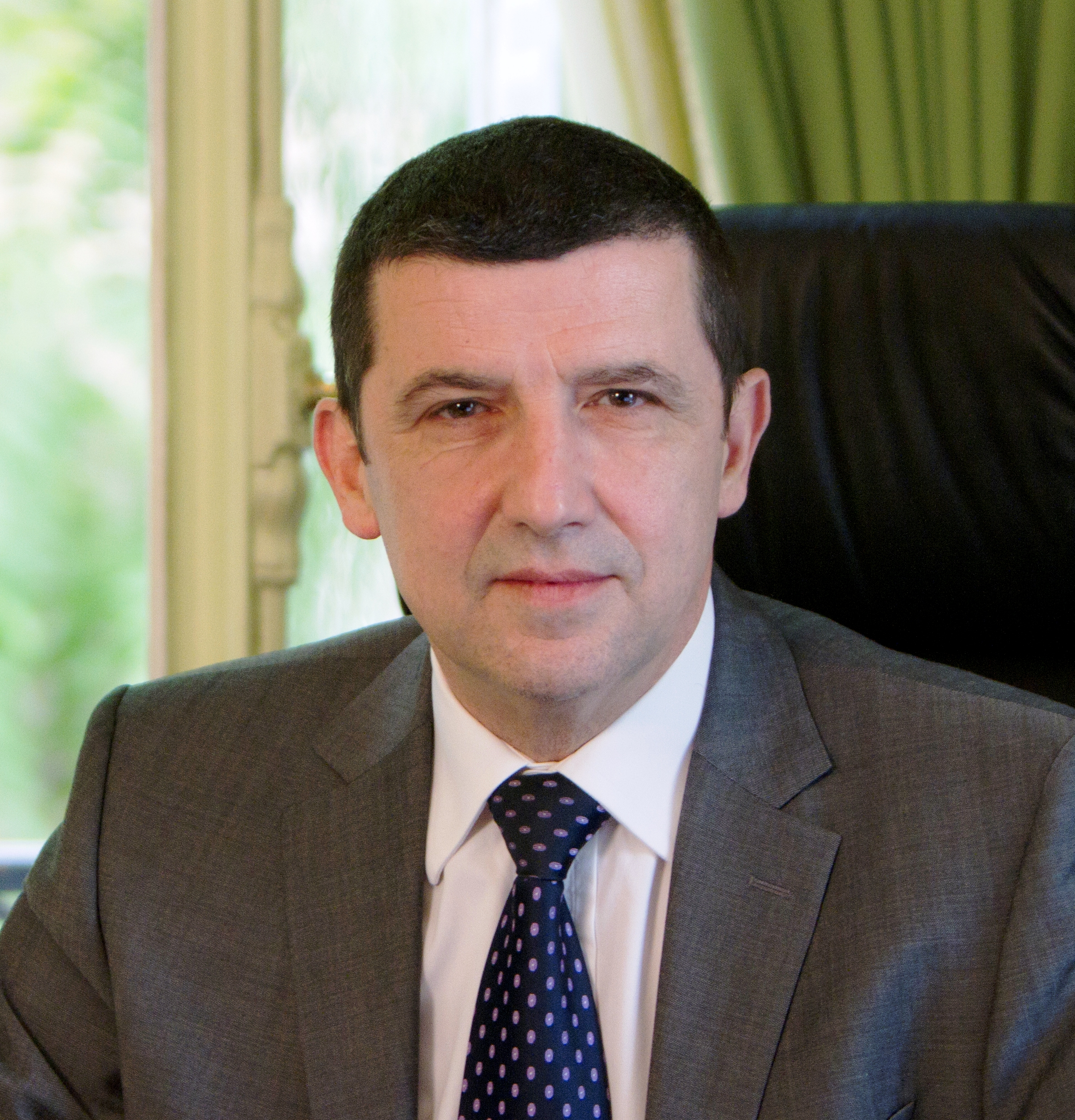
- Lentz in 2011
- Born: 8 July 1959 (age 67)

Academic work
- Institutions: Fondation Napoléon; Institut catholique d'études supérieures

Thierry Lentz (born 8 July 1959) is a French historian. He specializes in Napoleon Bonaparte and Napoleonic studies. He has been the director of the Fondation Napoléon since 2000. Since 2021, he had been an associate professor at the Institut catholique d'études supérieures.

== Awards ==
- 1990: prix Erckmann-Chatrian - Roederer
- 1993: prix Paul-Michel Perret de l'Académie des sciences morales et politiques - Savary, le séide de Napoléon
- 1997: prix Premier-Empire des prix d'histoire de la Fondation Napoléon - Le 18-Brumaire : les coups d’État de Napoléon Bonaparte
- 2005: prix du Mémorial, grand prix littéraire d'Ajaccio - Nouvelle histoire du Premier Empire T.II : l'effondrement du système napoléonien ; et pour l'ensemble de son œuvre
- 2013: prix Guizot (médaille d'argent) de l'Académie française - Napoléon diplomate
- 2013: prix Pierre-Lafue - Le Congrès de Vienne : une refondation de l'Europe
- 2016: prix Chateaubriand - Joseph Bonaparte
- 2016: prix du Guesclin - Joseph Bonaparte
- 2018: prix Charles-Aubert (histoire) de l'Académie des sciences morales et politiques - pour l'ensemble de son œuvre, à l'occasion de l'achèvement de la correspondence générale de Napoléon Bonaparte
- 2019: prix du nouveau cercle de l'union (histoire) - Le Premier Empire
- 2021: prix d'honneur du Festival Napoléon
