= Fondation Napoléon =

French non-profit organisation

- Formation: 12 November 1987; 38 years ago
- Headquarters: Paris, France
- President: Victor-André Masséna
- Vice President: Nicolas Walewski
- Website: https://fondationnapoleon.org/

The Fondation Napoléon (English: Napoleon Foundation) is a registered French non-profit organization established on 12 November 1987. It supports academic research and public understanding of the First French Empire and the Second French Empire.

The foundation’s scope also encompasses the periods of the French Directory and the Consulate, during which Napoleon Bonaparte served as First Consul after the Coup of 18 Brumaire.

The foundation is headed by Victor-André Masséna, Prince of Essling, and its director since 2000 has been historian Thierry Lentz.

In 2002, the foundation launched the project to publish Napoleon's complete correspondence, which includes over 41,000 letters. It also contributes to the preservation of historical sites. The foundation runs a bilingual website and maintains a digital library, with over 13,000 historical volumes accessible to the public. It also publishes Napoleonica, an international journal on Napoleonic history.

== Projects ==
The Fondation Napoléon supports research on the history of the First French Empire and Second French Empire by awarding six research grants per year to French and international PhD candidates. It also awards an annual history prize for works related to the two French empires. In addition, the foundation supports academic conferences, bicentennial and sesquicentennial commemorations, and the publication of Napoleonic books and exhibition catalogues.

=== Restoration of Longwood House ===
Between 2010 and 2014, the foundation co-funded a restoration campaign for Longwood House, Napoleon’s exile residence on Saint Helena, raising approximately €1.4 million through an international appeal. The campaign received matching support from the French Ministry of Foreign Affairs.

=== Statue of Napoleon in Rouen ===
In September 2020, the foundation opposed a proposal by Rouen’s mayor to replace Napoleon’s statue with a memorial to feminist Gisèle Halimi. The statue was later registered as a monument historique in December 2021.

=== General Correspondence of Napoleon I ===
- The Napoleonic Digital Library, a library of downloadable Napoleonic texts, was launched in 2010.
- The website napoleon.org was founded in 1996.
- The archive platform napoleonica.org was established in 1999.
- Napoleonica La Revue, a bilingual peer-reviewed journal, was founded in 2008.

==== Art and historical memorabilia collection ====
The foundation maintains an art and historical memorabilia collection of around 1,400 items. These items have been exhibited in Paris, São Paulo, Monterrey, and Minden, among other locations.

== Leadership ==
President: Victor-André Masséna, Prince d’Essling (since 13 December 2005).

Vice President: Count Nicolas Walewski.

== See also ==
- Napoleon I of France
- First French Empire
- Second French Empire
