= Whitehall Accord =

Accord between Great Britain and certain French colonial counter-revolutionaries

The Whitehall Accord (French: Traité de Whitehall) was agreed on 19 February 1793 by Henry Dundas and signed on 25 February 1793. It was an agreement between the Kingdom of Great Britain and French counter-revolutionary colonists from the French possessions of Saint-Domingue, Martinique and Guadeloupe. The treaty allowed them to maintain ownership of their slaves and properties (slavery was later abolished by the French government on 4 February 1794), while the British were allowed to occupy Guadeloupe and Martinique to prevent the French revolutionary forces from occupying the islands. The postwar status of Saint Domingue was left open, while Martinique and Guadeloupe were to be returned to a restored French monarchy.

It was signed by Henry Dundas for the British, and French émigrés and monarchists Pierre Victor, baron Malouet (Saint-Domingue), Louis de Curt (Guadeloupe), Ignace-Joseph-Philippe de Perpigna and Louis-François Dubuc (Martinique).

== Sources ==
- Henry Lémery, Martinique, terre française, G.P. Maisonneuve, 1962, p. 32.
