= Law of 4 February 1794 =

French law abolishing slavery in all French colonies

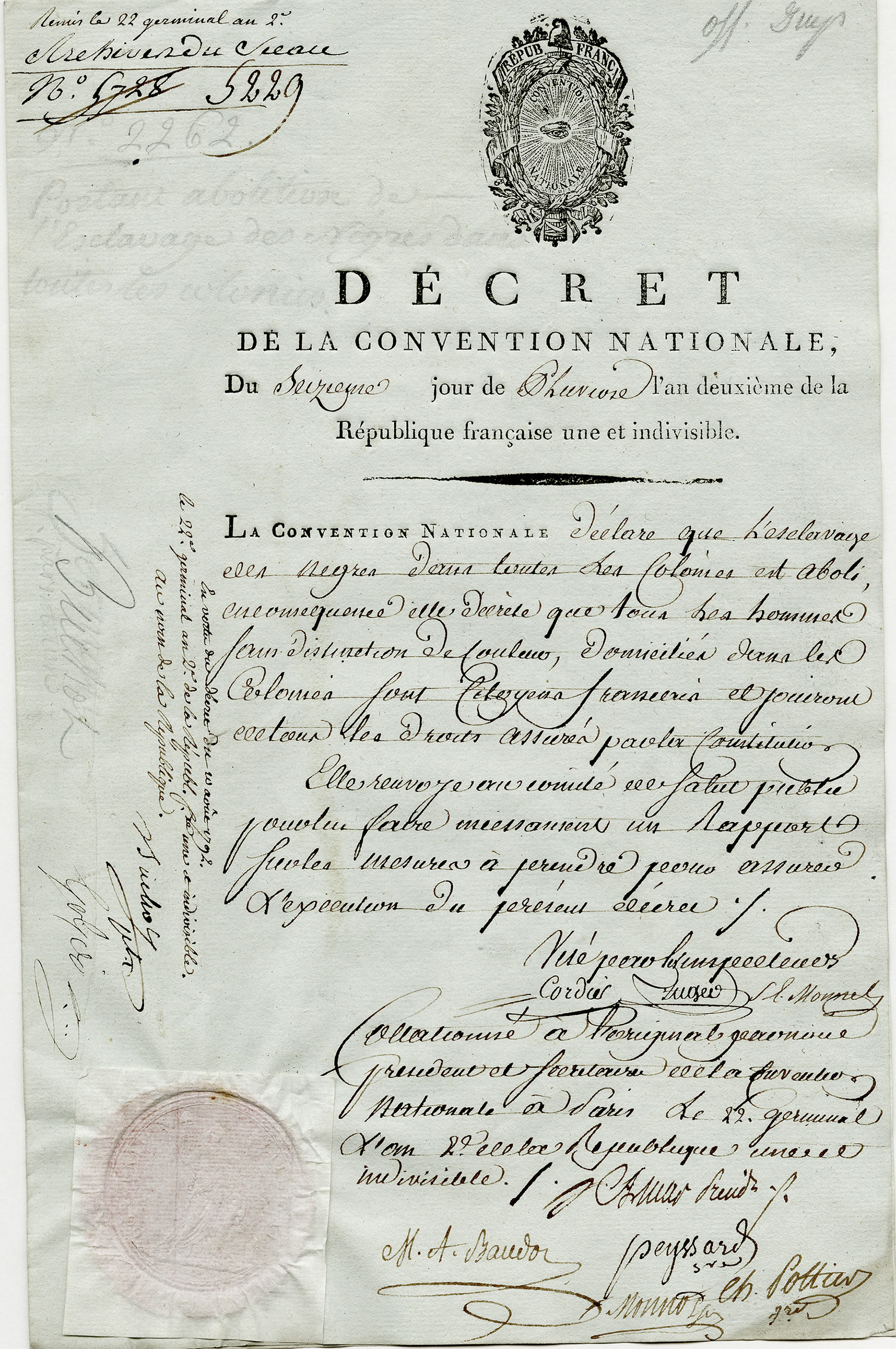
The decree of the Law of 4 February 1794

The Law of 4 February 1794 (16 Pluviôse of the Year II) was a decree of the French First Republic's National Convention which abolished slavery in the French colonial empire.

== Background ==
During the early modern period, France began colonizing the Americas and became involved in the Atlantic slave trade. By the late 18th century, France had several colonies in the West Indies and the Indian Ocean whose economies were reliant on slave labor. In 1788, Jacques Pierre Brissot and Étienne Clavière founded the Society of the Friends of the Blacks, an organization dedicated to the abolition of slavery. Brissot had spent time in England and was inspired by the Society for Effecting the Abolition of the Slave Trade, a British abolitionist organization founded just a year earlier. However, their efforts were not effective; at the beginning of the French Revolution, a measure to abolish slavery in France's colonies was proposed and then dropped due to opposition from the French nobility. In 1790, the National Assembly affirmed their support for the continuation of slavery.

The French colony of Saint-Domingue in particular was important to the economy of France. A 1791 slave rebellion in the colony led to widespread turmoil, which the Spanish and British attempted to take advantage of by invading Saint-Domingue. These circumstances forced commissioners sent by the French First Republic to the colony to gradually abolish slavery in Saint-Dominigue in order to win its Black population to their side. In June 1793, Léger-Félicité Sonthonax and Étienne Polverel decreed that all slaves who were willing to fight under them would be freed. Two months later on 29 August, Sonthonax freed all slaves in the northern region of Saint-Dominigue. After gradually implementing anti-slavery measures in the western and southern regions, Polverel abolished slavery there as well on 31 October.

Although Sonthonax and Polverel were both abolitionists, they had not come to Saint-Domingue with the intention of abolishing slavery in the colony, having received no such orders from the National Convention in Paris. Their intention in abolishing slavery was solely utilitarian, as Sonthonax and Polverel both recognized that abolishing slavery would prevent Saint-Dominigue from falling into Spanish or British hands. Their proclamations abolishing slavery were not universally well-received even among the Black population of Saint-Domingue; Toussaint Louverture, a former slave who was allied with the Spanish at the time, doubted its sincerity. Louverture then began pressuring the Spanish to issue a similar proclamation.

== Enactment ==
Sonthonax sent delegates back to Paris to advocate for emancipation in all French territories. While the delegates were briefly arrested by opponents of Sonthonax, they were well received by the National Convention, where they justified the earlier proclamation on both practical and moral grounds. After their speeches, Jean-François Delacroix exclaimed that the National Convention should not "dishonor itself by a long discussion", and so it passed the law by acclamation.

The law read as follows:

The National Convention declares slavery abolished throughout all the colonies: consequently, it decrees that all men, without distinction of color, domiciliated in the colonies, are French citizens, and entitled to the enjoyment of all the rights secured by the Constitution. Referred to the Committee of Public Safety for it to report immediately on the measures to be taken for the execution of the decree.

== Effect ==
=== In French colonies ===
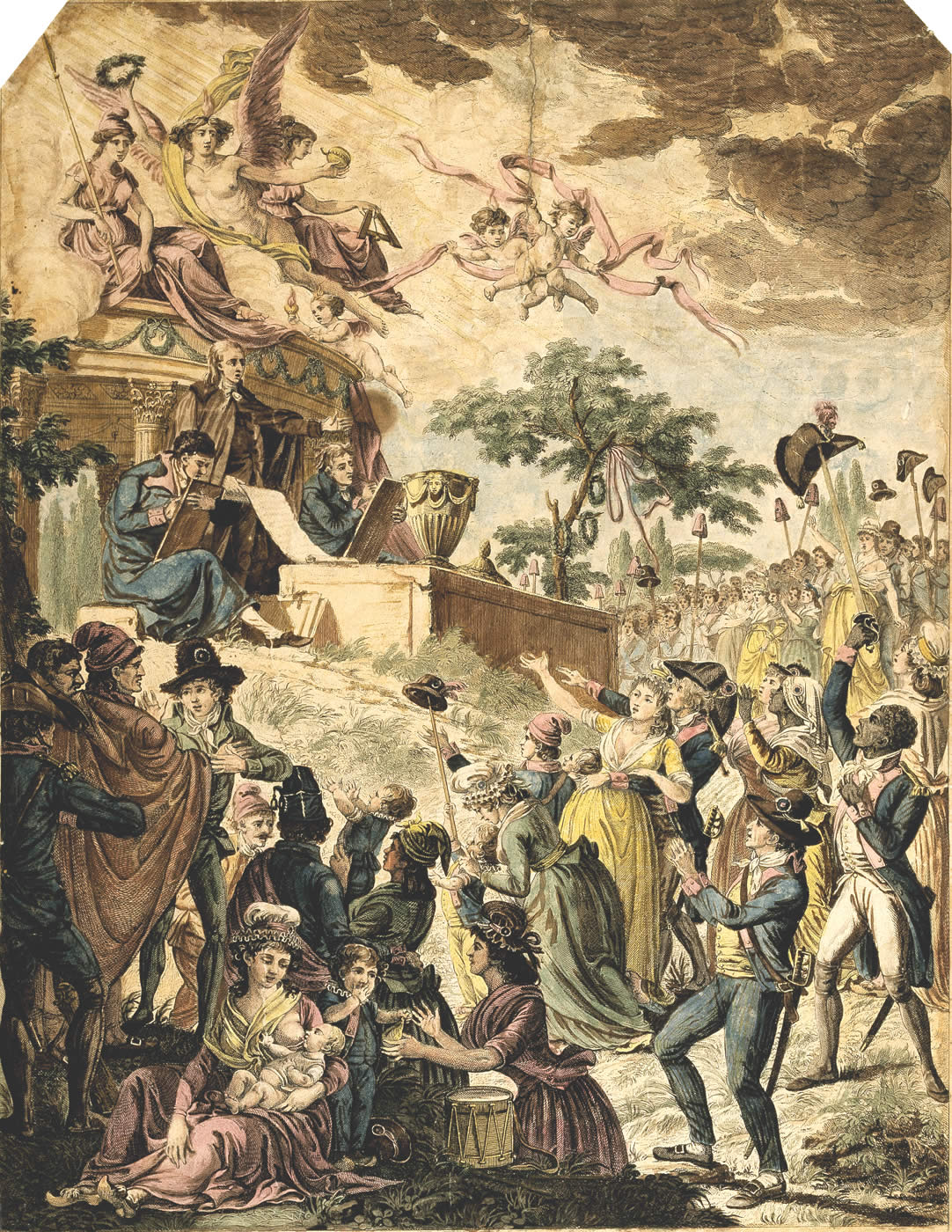
A contemporary French illustration commemorating the Law of 4 February 1794

After passing the law, the Committee of Public Safety sent 1,200 troops to the French West Indies to enforce it. They recaptured Guadeloupe from the British and their French Royalist allies, using the colony as a base from which to retake other islands in the West Indies. The law did succeed in winning over Black people in the region to the French Republican side, which greatly benefited them. It may have influenced Louverture's decision to switch sides from the Spanish to the French Republicans, though it is unclear whether he knew of the law early enough for it to have influenced his decision.

Implementation of the law did not always create a change in material conditions. In Guadeloupe, emancipated slaves were effectively restricted to plantations by laws against vagrancy and were not given the pay they were legally owed. In Saint-Domingue, as well, French Republican officials attempted to maintain the colony's plantation economy, which caused conflict with the newly freed slaves, who wanted autonomy.

=== In other colonies ===
The French spread copies of the law, as well as other revolutionary documents such as the Declaration of the Rights of Man, throughout the region. This eventually helped to spark slave revolts in Venezuela, Brazil, Jamaica and Cuba.

== Revocation ==
The Coup of 18 Brumaire and the rise to power of Napoleon led to a reversal of French policies regarding slavery. Initially, Napoleon was indifferent to colonial slavery, though he was eventually convinced by proslavery lobbyists in France that substantial profits could be made if slavery was restored to French colonies. In a letter to Laurent Jean François Truguet, who opposed the restoration of slavery, Napoleon argued that "I am for the whites, because I am white; I have no other reason, and this is the right one". Napoleon also wanted to restore French control over Saint-Dominigue, which had effectively come under the total leadership of Louverture. He subsequently implemented the Law of 20 May 1802, which reinstated slavery in French colonies and France's involvement in the slave trade.

== Legacy ==
It is sometimes considered the first abolition of slavery in history.

== Bibliography ==
- Blackburn, Robin (1988). The Overthrow of Colonial Slavery, 1776-1848. London: Verso. hdl:2027/heb.03158. ISBN 978-1-78960-086-5.
- Cochin, Augustin (1864). Results of Emancipation. Translated by Booth, Mary L. (Popular ed.). Boston: Walker, Wise and Company.
- Drescher, Seymour (2009). Abolition: A History of Slavery and Antislavery. Cambridge: Cambridge University Press. doi:10.1017/CBO9780511770555. ISBN 978-0-511-76667-1.
- Geggus, David Patrick (2002). Haitian Revolutionary Studies. Bloomington, Ind.: Indiana University Press. hdl:2027/heb.04575. ISBN 978-0-253-34104-4.
