= Grande Baie (Guadeloupe) =

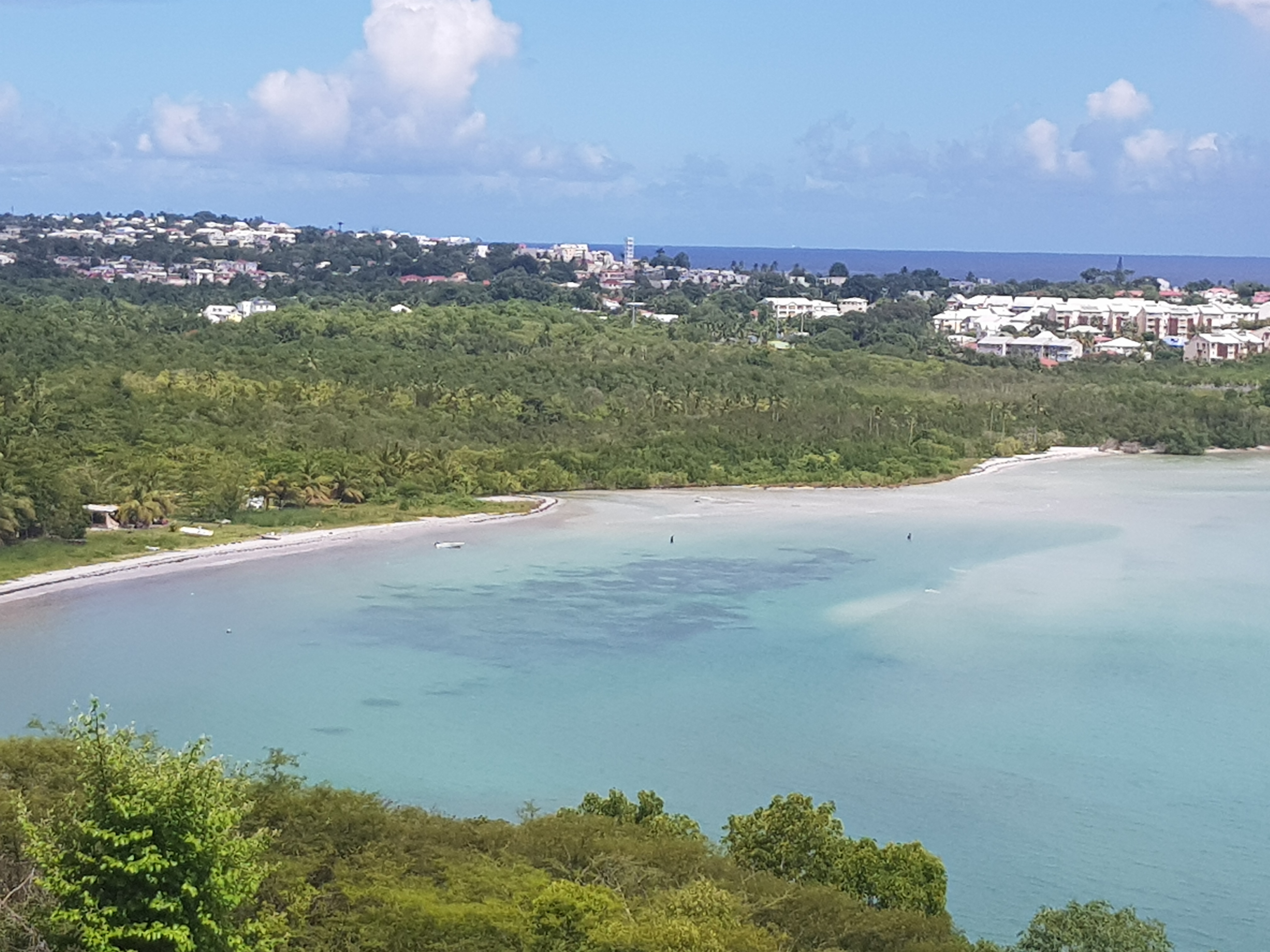
- View of Grande Baie

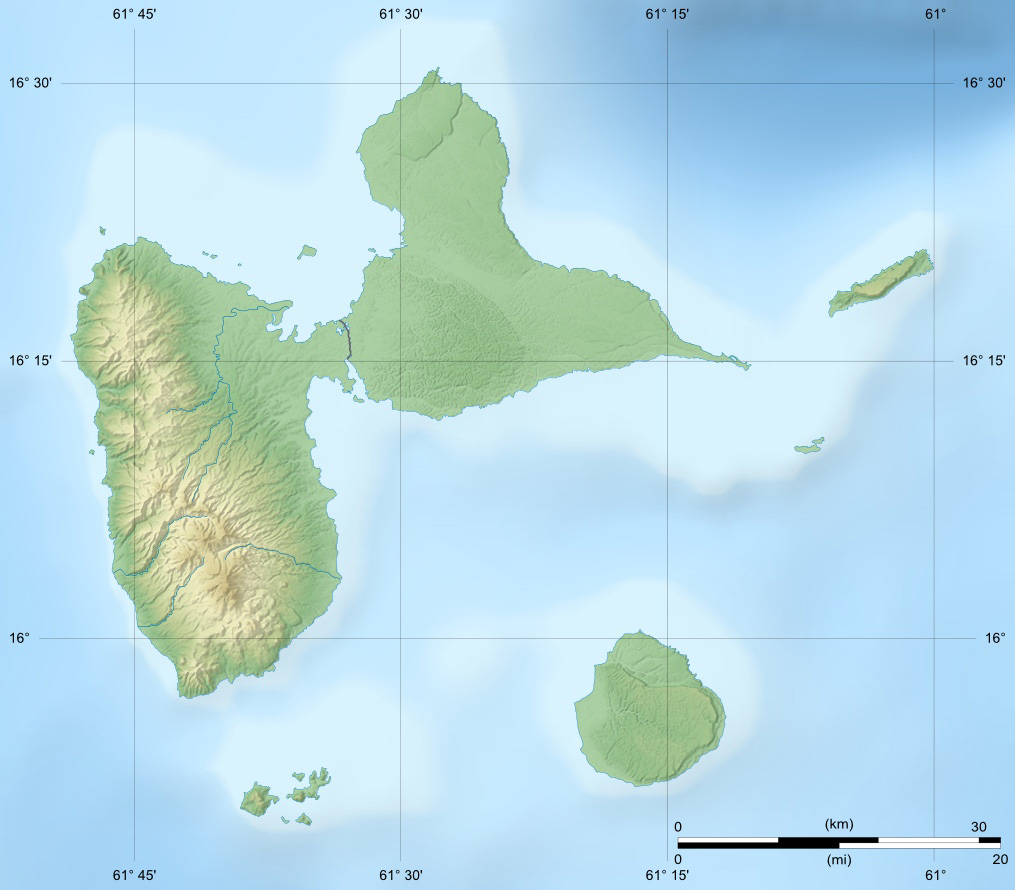
- Location on Guadeloupe
- Location: Grande-Terre Guadeloupe
- Coordinates: 16°12′44″N 61°30′49″W
- Type: Bay
- Primary inflows: Caribbean Sea
- Max. length: 1.7 km (1.1 mi)
- Max. width: 1 km (0.62 mi)
- Settlements: Le Gosier

Grande Baie is a bay in Grande-Terre, Guadeloupe, located in Le Gosier between Pointe de la Verdure et le Fort Fleur d'épée. The bay is approximately 1.7 km (1.05 mi) long and 1 km (0.62 mi) wide. Two streams flow from the hilly region of Les Grands Fonds into the bay.

During the 18th and 19th centuries ships would anchor in this bay while waiting to enter Pointe-à-Pitre. The bay was the main landing point chosen by enemies attacking Grande-Terre. Fort Fleur d'épée was built above Grande Baie in the 18th century, to protect the bay's anchorages and ward off invasions.
