= Fort Fleur d'épée =

Coordinates: 16°13′0″N 61°30′47″W

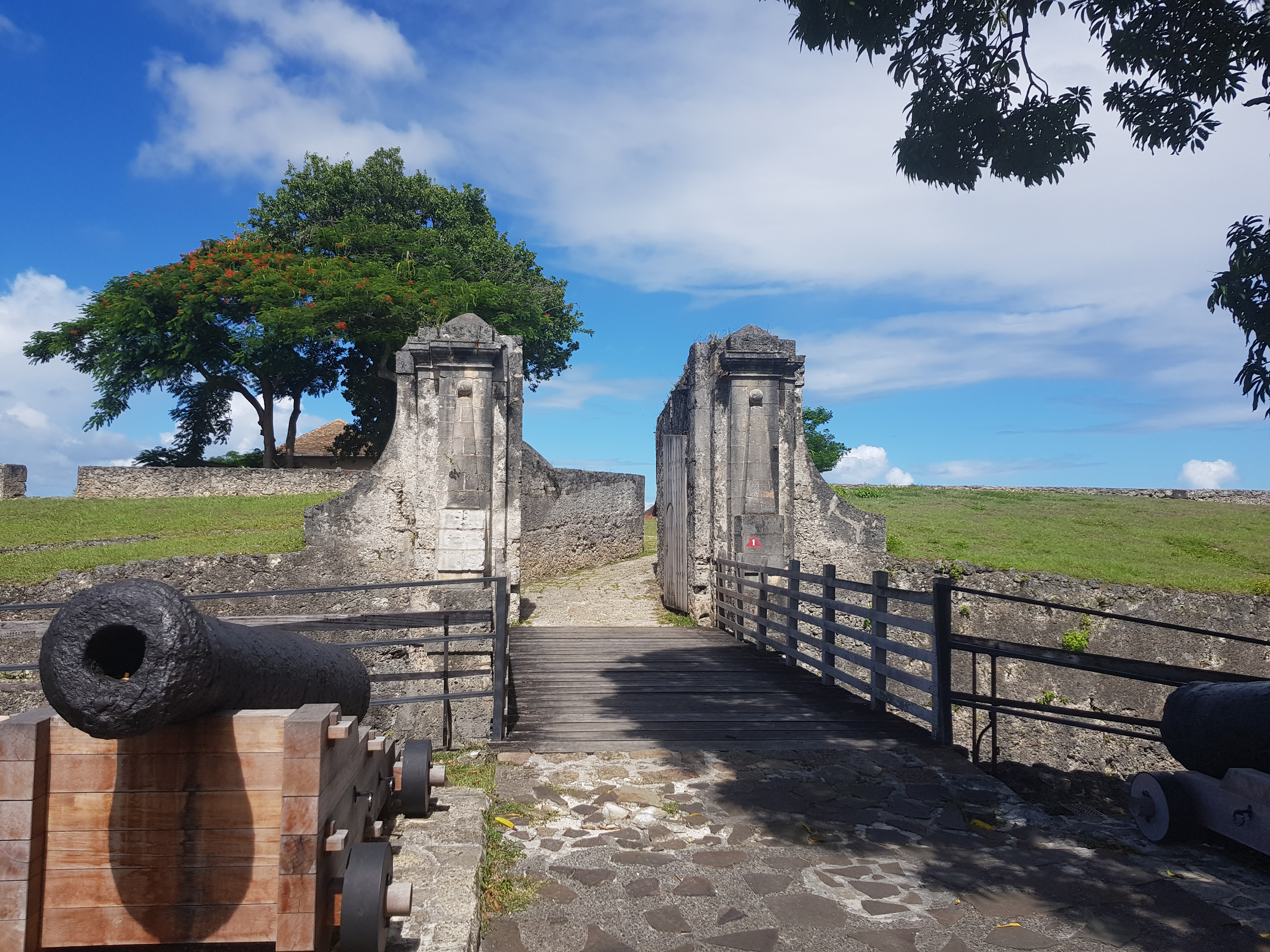
Entrance to Fort Fleur d'épée

Fort Fleur d'épée is a fortification in Grande-Terre, Guadeloupe. It was built between 1750 and 1763 by Sébastien Le Prestre de Vauban above the town of Le Gosier. It is the site of multiple historic battles, including the successful overtake by French battalion under Victor Hugues, which expelled the British from Guadeloupe. The fort was classified as a French historic monument in 1979.

== Location ==
The fort is situated in the Bas-du-Fort neighborhood, above the town of Le Gosier. It overlooks Grande Baie (Great Bay) from an altitude of about 40 m (131 ft), and faces Pointe de la Verdure beach.

== Description ==
The fort was built on a hexagonal plan. It is made up of underground rooms leading to smaller rooms. The powder magazine and kitchen with a furnace are still visible. Its spacious entrance hall now hosts temporary art exhibitions.

== History ==
At the end of the 17th century, Fort Louis (previously Fort l'Union) was constructed to protect the Pointe-à-Pitre harbor. However, the fort was not able to protect all the anchorages of Pointe-à-Pitre, in particular those of Grande Baie. In order to provide more protection, the engineer Labbé de Talsy established a battery on the Morne Fleur d'Épée (Fleur d'Épée Hill), further east. Built after the Seven Years' War, around 1763, it included 18 large-caliber cannons from Fort Louis.

Faced with the threat of English attack following the French Revolution, Governor Collot (appointed in 1792) had the battery hastily replaced by a fort.

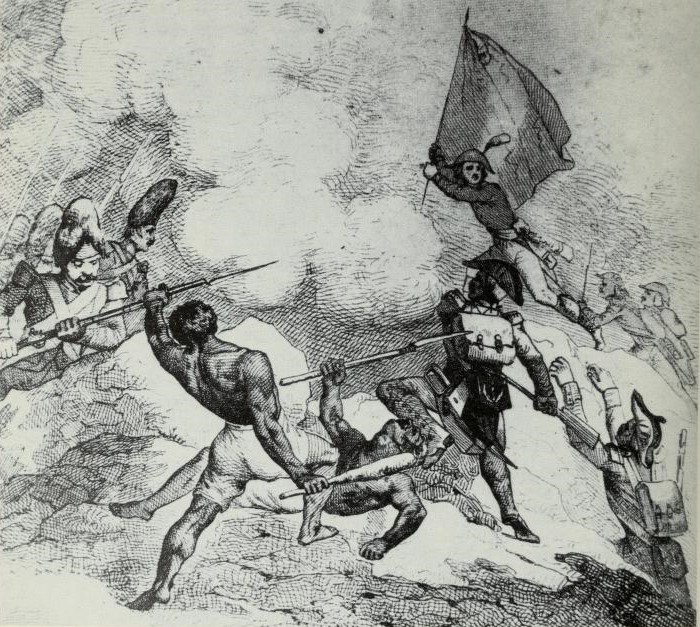
British capture of the fort in 1794

The fort was captured by the British on April 2, 1794. Then, on June 6–7, it was retaken by a French battalion led by Victor Hugues and General Charles Étienne Rouyer (the latter having been seriously wounded during the assault). Aided by former slaves freed under the abolition decree of February 4 and by republican colonists, the fort's defenders withstood attempts by British troops to retake it. The British were completely driven out of Guadeloupe on December 11, 1794.

From 1801 to 1802, the fort was reinforced during the uprisings sparked by Napoleon Bonaparte's re-establishment of slavery and the revolt led by Louis Delgrès.

In the 1830s, major works were carried out, such as the digging of a ditch, the raising of the perimeter wall and rampart, and the construction of the drawbridge and entrance. However, in 1854, due to a poorly flanked scarp wall and poor positioning—it was vulnerable to bombardment from the nearby Morne Mascot—the Fortifications Committee recommended its permanent abandonment.

== Name ==
While the origins of the fort's name are unknown, fleur d'epée is French for "flower of the sword".

== Gallery ==
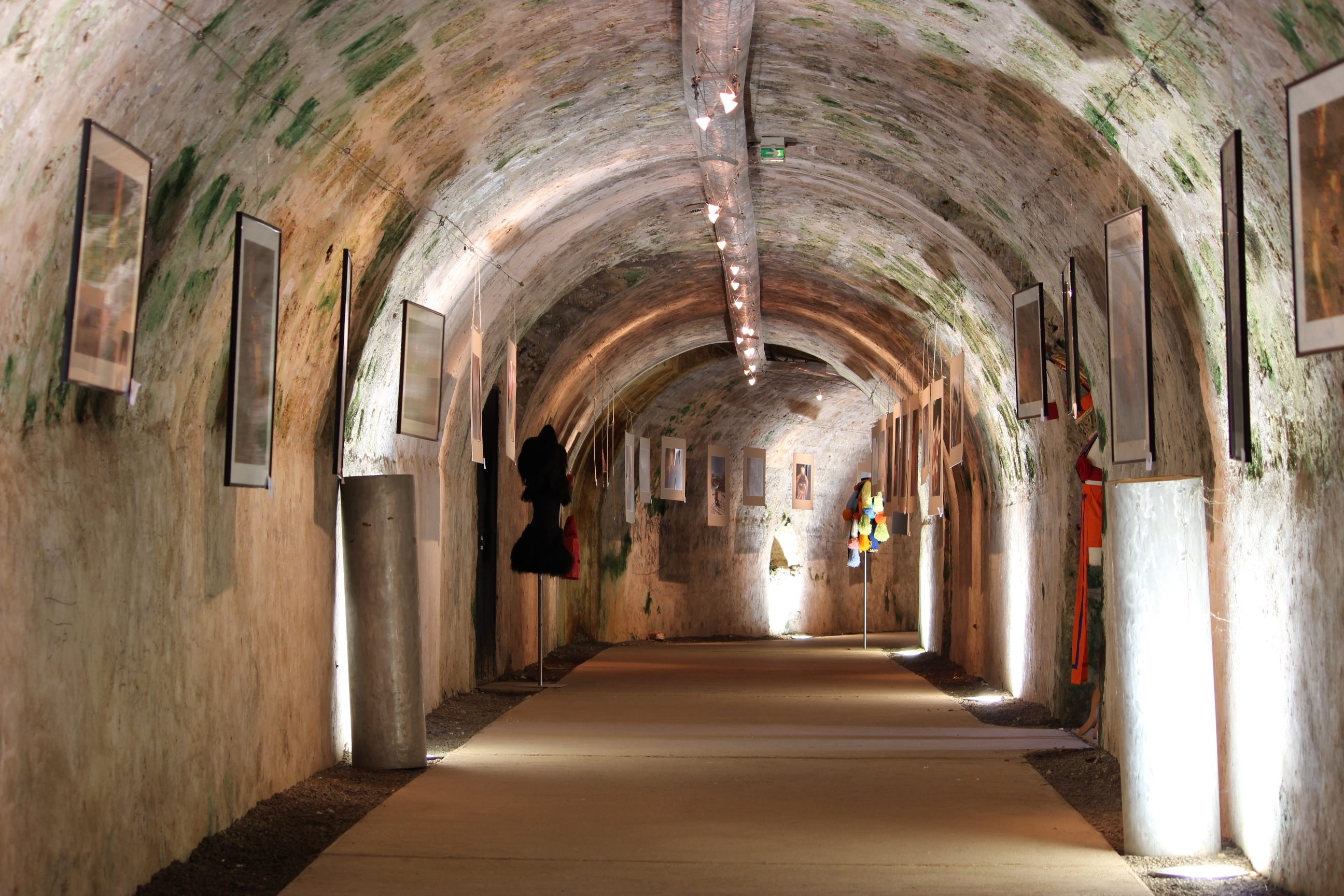
Corridor with art exhibited

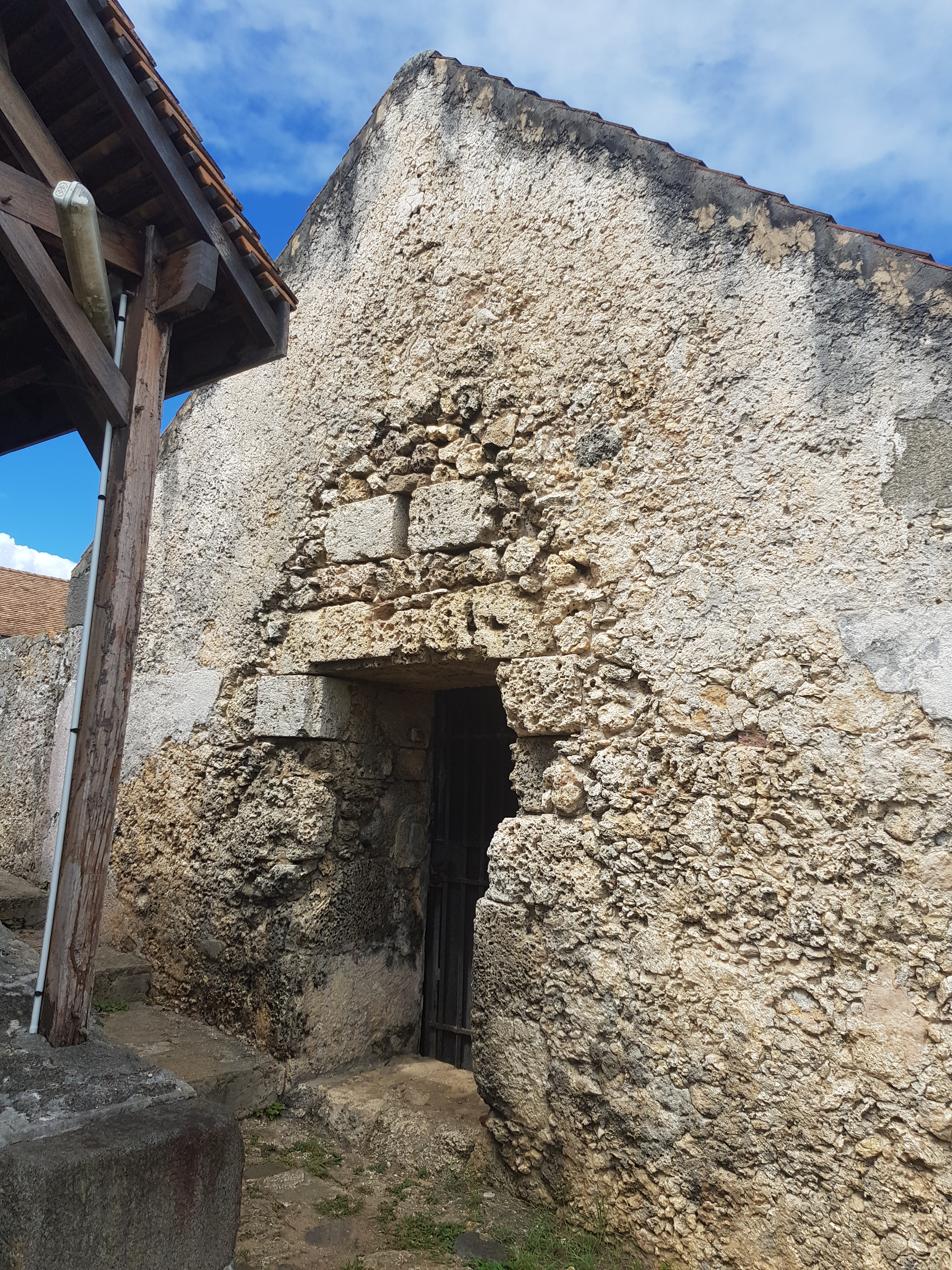
Powder magazine

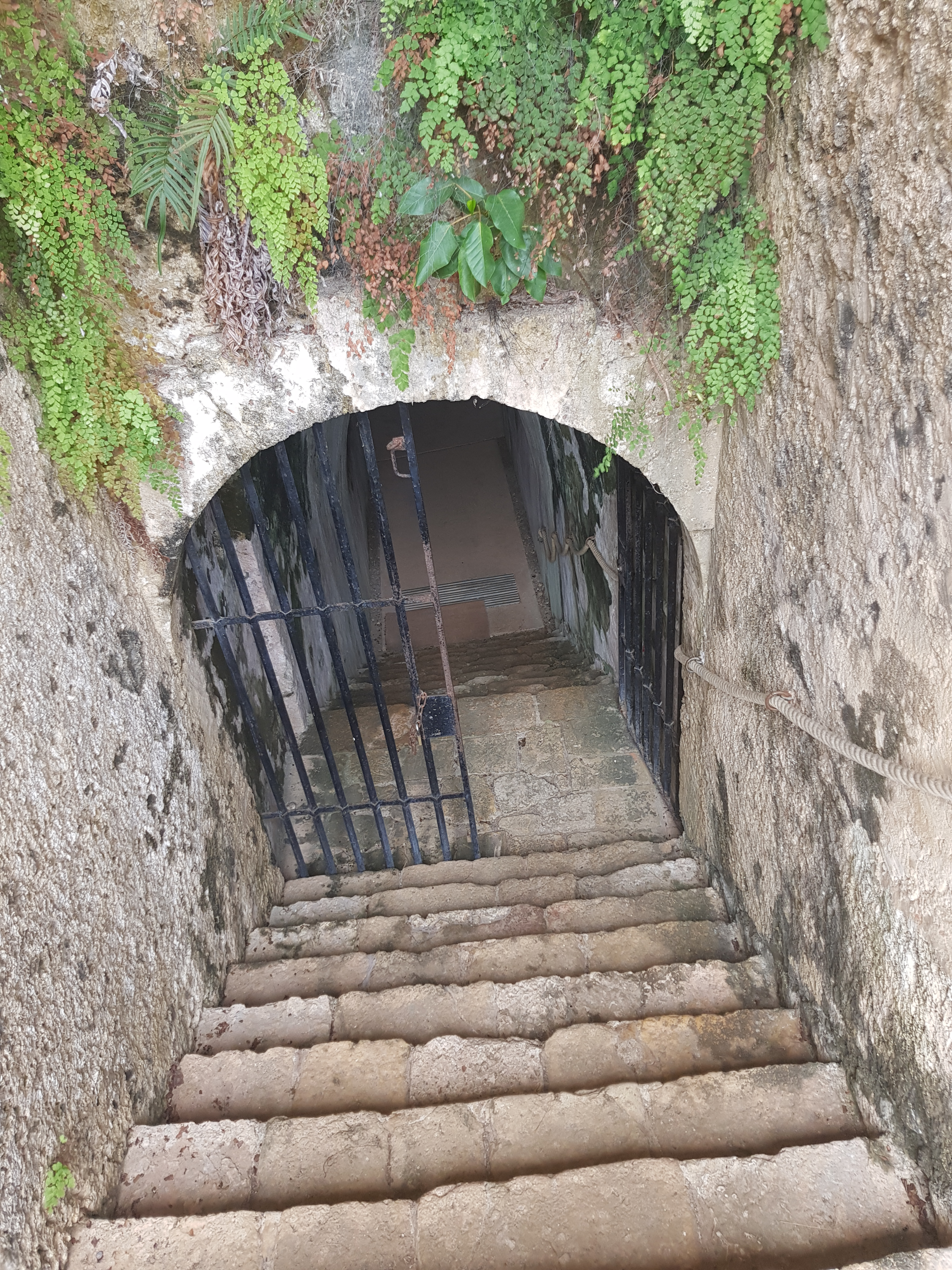
Entrance to underground passages

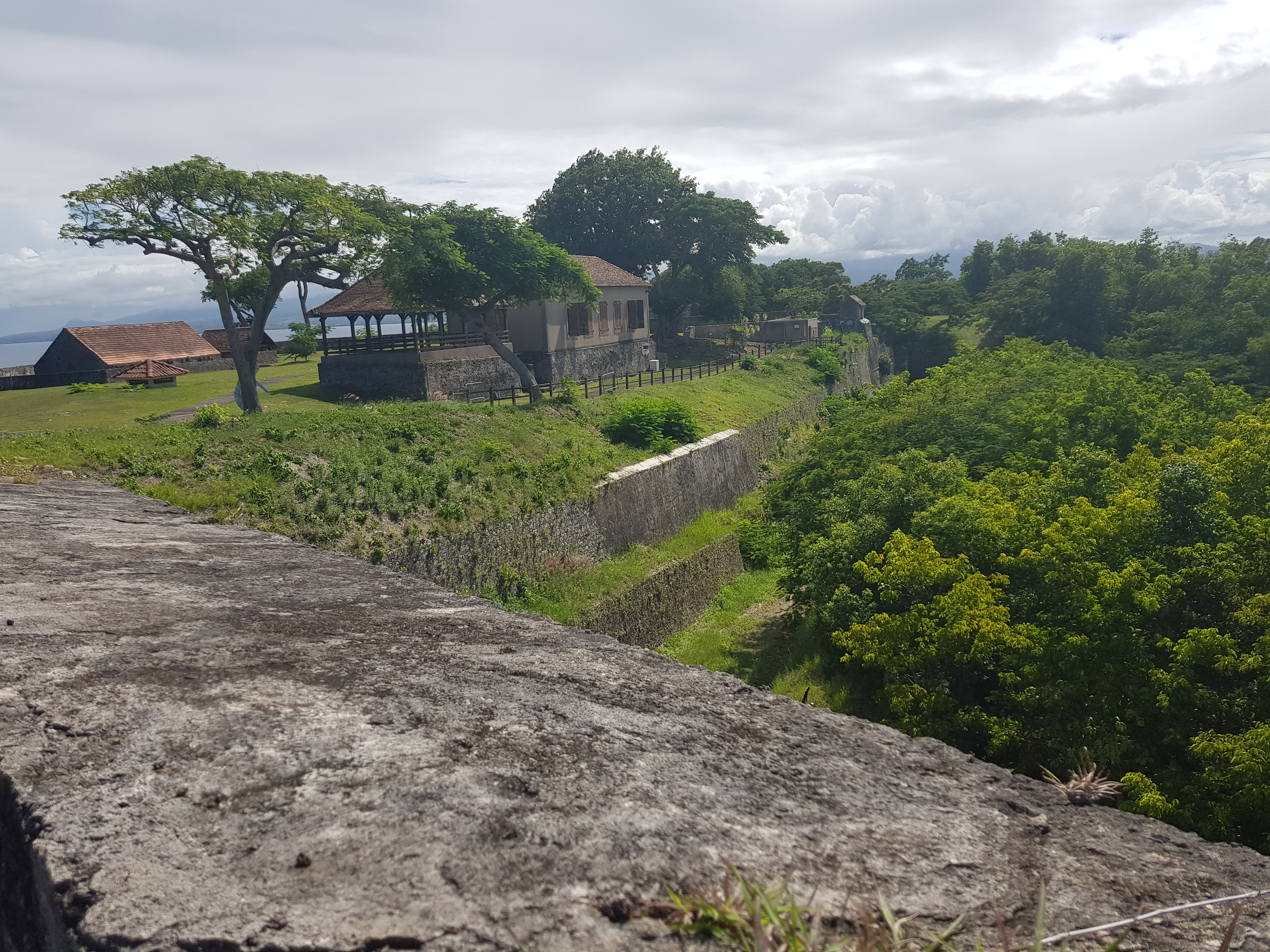
Fort walls and grounds

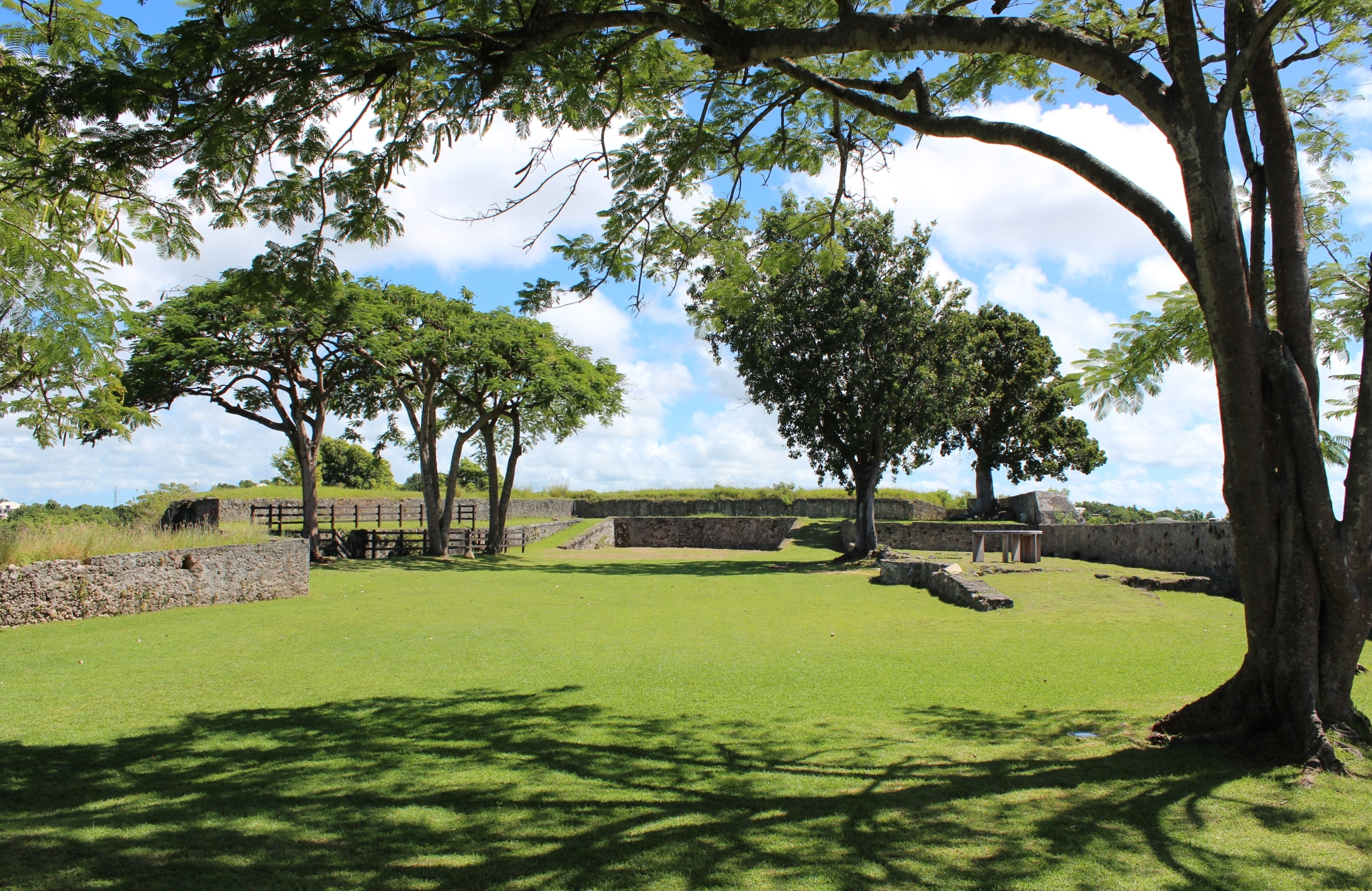
Fort grounds

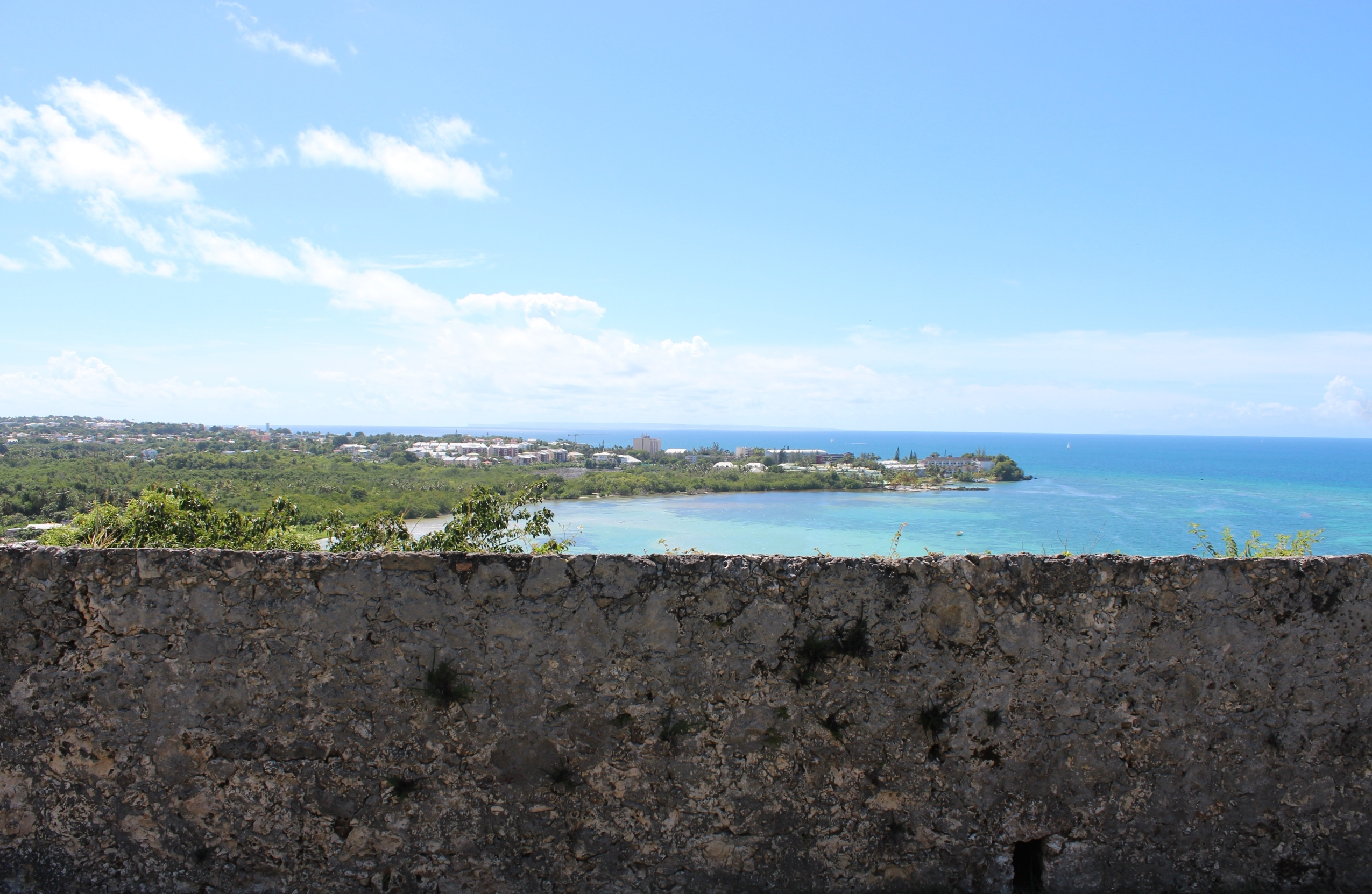
View of Grande Baie from fort grounds
