= Effects of the 1928 Okeechobee hurricane in the Caribbean =

1928 Okeechobee hurricane
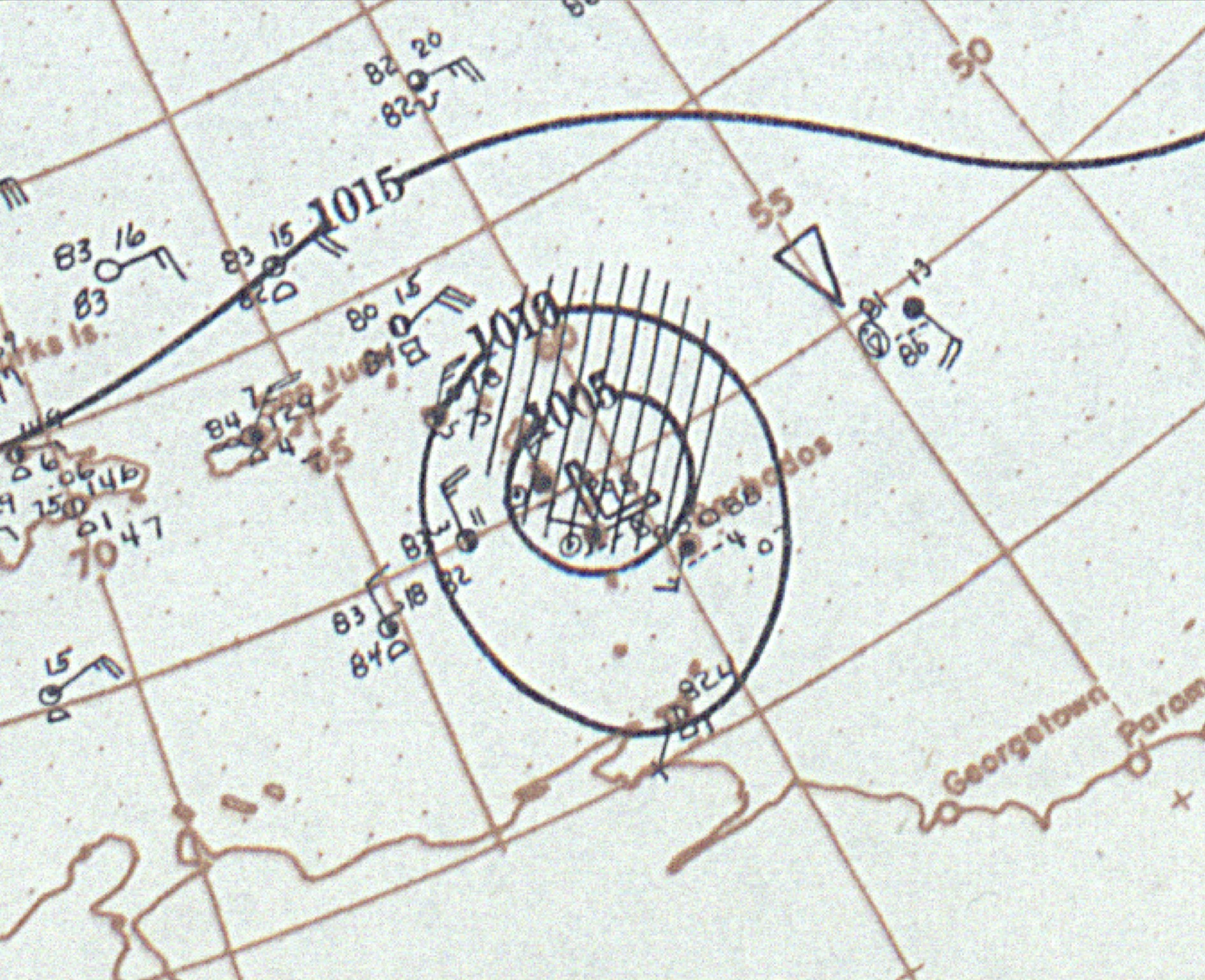
- Surface Weather map of the hurricane intensifying as it approaches the island of Guadeloupe on September 12

Meteorological history
- Duration: September 11–14, 1928

Category 5 major hurricane
- 1-minute sustained (SSHWS/NWS)
- Highest winds: 160 mph (260 km/h)
- Lowest pressure: 931 mbar (hPa); 27.49 inHg

Overall effects
- Fatalities: 1,632+
- Damage: $117.49 million in 1928 USD (≥$1.69 billion in 2024)
- Areas affected: Lesser Antilles, Greater Antilles
- Part of the 1928 Atlantic hurricane season

The effects of the 1928 Okeechobee hurricane in the Caribbean included more than 1,000 deaths and damage to nearly every building on Puerto Rico. The hurricane, also known as "San Felipe II" or "San Felipe Segundo" in Puerto Rico, originated from a tropical depression that formed near Dakar, Senegal, on September 6. Traversing the Atlantic Ocean, the cyclone struck the Lesser Antilles beginning late on September 12. The storm, which was moving west-northwestward, intensified into a Category 5 hurricane on the modern-day Saffir–Simpson hurricane wind scale on September 13. Shortly thereafter, the storm made landfall near Maunabo, Puerto Rico, becoming the first and only known Category 5 hurricane to strike the island. The cyclone later struck the Bahamas as a powerful system and made landfall near West Palm Beach, Florida, early on September 17 as a Category 4 hurricane. Thereafter, it moved farther inland across the Southeastern United States and transitioned into an extratropical cyclone over North Carolina on September 20, before the remnants became indistinguishable over Ontario on September 21.

Guadeloupe and Puerto Rico suffered some of the worst effects of the cyclone. On the former, which apparently received little warning, the hurricane may have produced wind gusts as high as 186 mph (299 km/h), leaving extensive damage to crops and buildings and rendering about three-fourths of the island's population homeless. At least 1,200 people died on Guadeloupe, and damage was estimated at just over 800 million francs ($31.45 million USD). (Note: All monetary figures are in 1928 United States dollars, unless otherwise noted) Winds on Puerto Rico reached a 5-minute sustained speed of 150 mph (240 km/h) in San Juan and possibly 200 mph (320 km/h) farther south. In addition to major agricultural losses – including to coffee plants, with the island never regaining its status as a major exporter of that crop – the storm destroyed 24,728 homes and partially destroyed 192,444 others, leaving roughly 500,000 people homeless. Damage on Puerto Rico totaled approximately $85.312 million, while 312 deaths occurred. The cyclone also killed 42 people on Montserrat, 22 on Saint Kitts and Nevis, 10 on the United States Virgin Islands, 3 each on Martinique and Saint Barthélemy, and 1 on Dominica.

The British Leeward Islands received some assistance from the government of the United Kingdom and a few other countries. To rebuild Guadeloupe, the French government extended about 420 million francs (just over $16.51 million USD) in aid. However, a series of crises following the storm prevented the exportation of crops from that island from fully recovering until after World War II. Given the high death toll on Guadeloupe, a doctor in Pointe-à-Pitre ordered prisoners to quickly bury several hundred bodies with lime to prevent pandemics. The American Red Cross received and then expended more than $5.9 million in aid to the United States Virgin Islands and Puerto Rico, with the latter given the vast majority of those contributions. Additionally, the organization provided blankets, clothes, cots, tents, and millions of pounds of building materials and food. Following deliberations, the United States Congress agreed to allocate $10 million to Puerto Rico. Similar to Guadeloupe, Puerto Rico struggled to recover from the storm due to subsequent events, including the Great Depression and the 1932 San Ciprián hurricane.

== Background ==
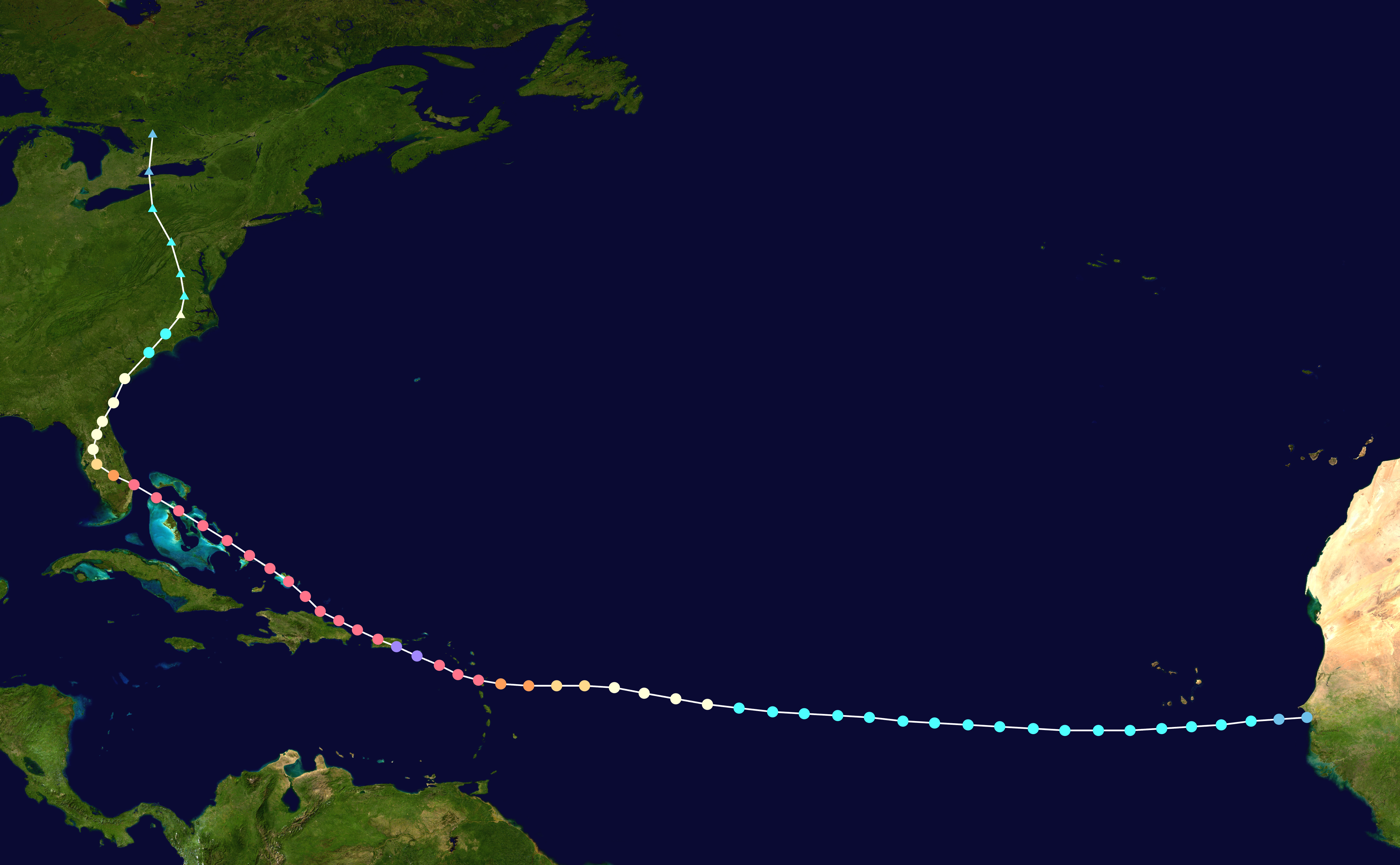
Map plotting the storm's track and intensity, according to the Saffir–Simpson scale Map key Saffir–Simpson scale Tropical depression (≤38 mph, ≤62 km/h) Tropical storm (39–73 mph, 63–118 km/h) Category 1 (74–95 mph, 119–153 km/h) Category 2 (96–110 mph, 154–177 km/h) Category 3 (111–129 mph, 178–208 km/h) Category 4 (130–156 mph, 209–251 km/h) Category 5 (≥157 mph, ≥252 km/h) Unknown Storm type Tropical cyclone Subtropical cyclone Extratropical cyclone, remnant low, tropical disturbance, or monsoon depression

A tropical depression developed almost immediately offshore the west coast of Africa on September 6, near Dakar, Senegal. The depression strengthened into a tropical storm later that day, shortly before passing south of the Cape Verde Islands. Further intensification was halted late on September 7. However, about 48 hours later, the storm resumed strengthening and became a Category 1 hurricane on the modern-day Saffir–Simpson hurricane wind scale. The system reached Category 4 intensity before striking Guadeloupe on September 12. Around midday on September 13, the storm strengthened into a Category 5 hurricane while moving west-northwestward, peaking with maximum sustained winds of 160 mph (260 km/h). About six hours later, the system made landfall in Puerto Rico near Maunabo at the same sustained wind speed; it remains the only tropical cyclone known to have struck the island as a Category 5 hurricane. Moving generally west-northwestward over Puerto Rico, the hurricane crossed the island in about 12 hours and re-entered the Atlantic between Aguadilla and Isabela. Thereafter, the storm weakened slightly, falling to Category 4 intensity, and traversed the Bahamas between September 15 and September 16.

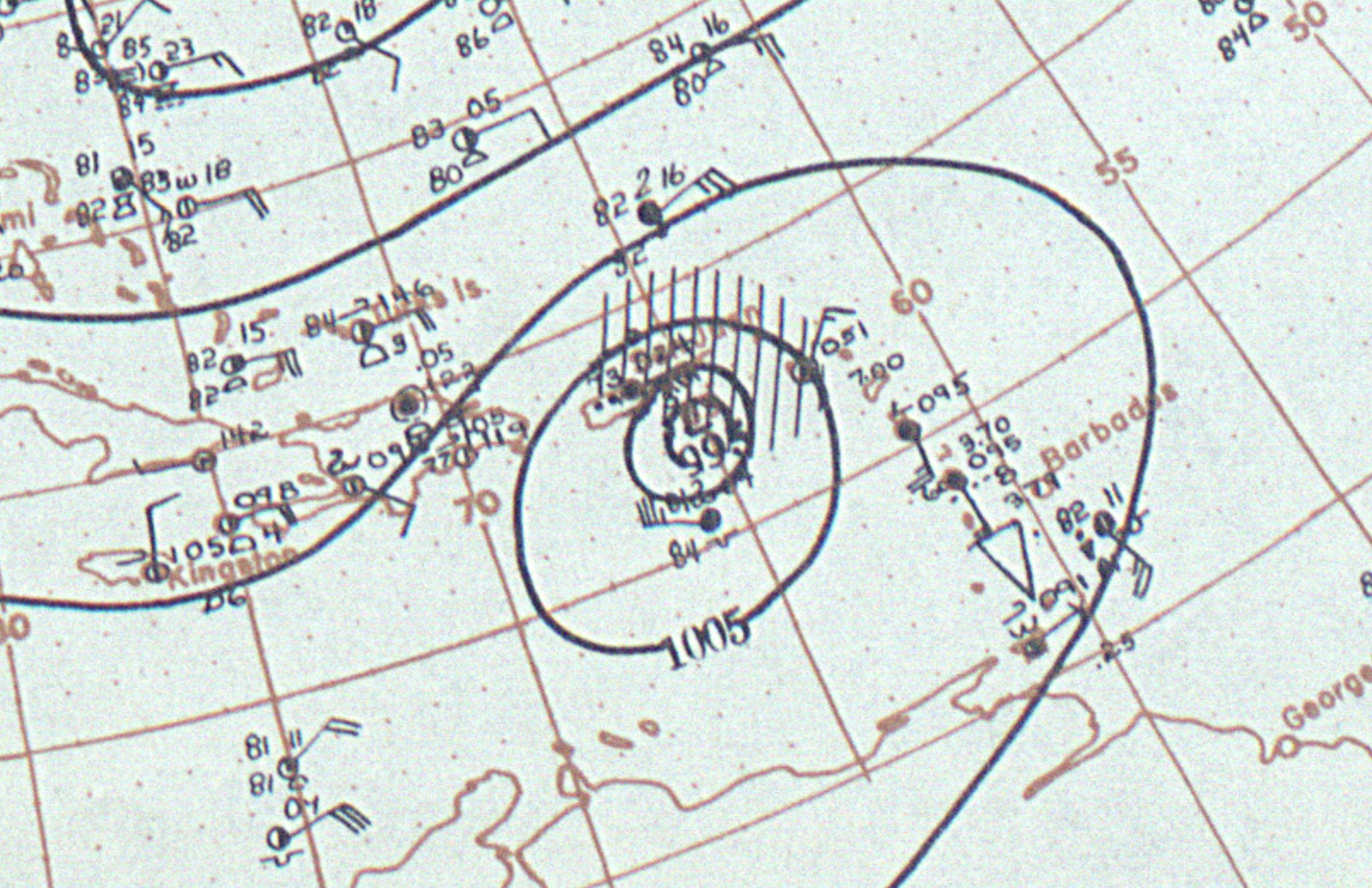
Surface weather analysis of the hurricane approaching landfall in Puerto Rico at peak intensity on September 13

The storm maintained Category 4 intensity through its landfall near Palm Beach, Florida, early on September 17. While crossing Florida, the system weakened significantly, falling to Category 1 intensity late on September 17 just north of the Tampa Bay area. Thereafter, the storm curved north-northeastward and briefly re-emerged into the Atlantic on September 18, but soon made another landfall near Edisto Island, South Carolina, as a Category 1 hurricane. Early on the following day, the system weakened to a tropical storm and transitioned into an extratropical cyclone over North Carolina hours later. The remnants moved northwestward across the Mid-Atlantic region before dissipating over Ontario on September 21.

The storm was named the San Felipe II Hurricane because the eye of the cyclone made landfall in Puerto Rico on the Christian feast day of Saint Philip. It was named "Segundo", Spanish for "the Second", because of another destructive "San Felipe hurricane" that struck the island on that same day in 1876. Since the arrival of Europeans in the Americas in 1492, all storms and hurricanes were named after the name of the saint of the day the storm hit Puerto Rico. In 1950, hurricanes began officially receiving names, but the practice of naming storms after saints continued until 1960.

== Preparations ==
The Lesser Antilles received varying amounts of warnings in anticipation of the storm. On the night of September 11, Barbados reported a wind shift, the first land-based sign of the approaching cyclone. Around that time, Alexander J. Mitchell of the Weather Bureau predicted that the storm would pass north of Martinique. After weather watchers and police on Nevis noticed rising and "very treacherous"-looking seas, according to R. Spencer Byron, they informed other people of a hurricane closing in on the island and urged them to board-up their homes or seek refuge at public buildings. On Montserrat, Commissioner Herbert Walter Peebles personally ordered many people to prepare, while signals were activated at St. George's Hill.

Guadeloupe received little advance notice. C. Holman B. Williams, director of the island's agricultural station, spoke with the West India and Panama Telegraph Company manager on the night of September 11, informing Williams of a cyclone "causing a certain amount of anxiety in the British colonies." Williams recalled hearing a radio report from Martinique and receiving a telegram from Puerto Rico Governor Horace M. Towner about the impending storm. However, the Pointe-à-Pitre mayor was also unaware of warning advisories and messages until speaking with Williams. Attempts to warn sugar factories on the following morning failed because winds had already toppled telegraph and telephone wires. A letter to United States Secretary of State Frank B. Kellogg from United States Consul William H. Hunt described the hurricane as striking "with unprecedented suddenness."

On September 11, just prior to the storm reaching the Lesser Antilles, a radio broadcast in San Juan, Puerto Rico, stated that the cyclone would likely pass south of the island late on the following day or early on September 13. Nonetheless, the advisory was sent via telegraph to 75 police districts and was broadcast from the naval radio station every two hours. An updated advisory from the Weather Bureau office in San Juan on the evening of September 12 indicated that the hurricane was located farther north than predicted. Consequently, warnings were also posted for 12 ports along the coast of Puerto Rico and Saint Thomas; this was the first hurricane warning broadcast by radio for the former. Ships avoided Puerto Rico or remained at port. Effective preparation is credited for the relatively low death toll of 312, and not a single ship was lost at sea in the vicinity of Puerto Rico. By comparison, the weaker 1899 San Ciriaco hurricane killed approximately 3,000 people. Similarly, advance warnings reduced the number of ships traversing the Greater Antilles region.

== Impact ==
Storm deaths by region
Locale	Deaths
Martinique	3
Guadeloupe	1,200
Montserrat	42
Dominica	1
Saint Kitts and Nevis	22
United States; Virgin Islands	10
Puerto Rico	312
Total:	1,632

=== Leeward Islands ===
The hurricane moved directly over the Leeward Islands in the Caribbean Sea, strengthening as it did so. Leeward Islands Governor Eustace Fiennes sent a telegram to the Associated Press, stating that "great havoc was wrought in the islands of Dominica and Mont Serrat [sic] and Nevis, and to a lesser extent in the islands of Antigua and Saint Kitts. Although Barbados and Saint Lucia mostly avoided the hurricane, abnormally high tides caused coastal flooding and damage to shipping, while a government dredger capsized at the latter.

On the island of Dominica, winds were clocked at 40 mph (64 km/h). One person perished, while the cyclone also damaged seawalls and ruined crops, leading to fears of a food shortage. In Martinique, further south of the storm's path, there were three deaths. Waves washed away homes along the island's northwest coast, although a report by Walter S. Reineck, U.S. Consul in Martinique, noted that the worst damage occurred to cocoa, lime, and sugarcane crops. The Le Paix newspaper also stated that the island "l'a échappé belle" ("had a narrow escape"), with less impact than expected in the countryside due to the storm passing farther north than predicted.

Montserrat, just north of the storm's center, was warned in advance of the storm but still suffered £150,000 (just under $730,000 USD) in damages and 42 deaths; Plymouth and Salem were devastated, and crop losses caused near-starvation conditions before relief could arrive. Commissioner Herbert Walter Peebles described the latter as "flattened." The hurricane destroyed approximately 1,000 acres (400 ha) of lime. All commercial and government buildings on the island were demolished, as were more than 600 homes, equivalent to about two-third of all residences on Montserrat. Three fatalities occurred on Saint Barthélemy. Saint Kitts and Nevis also suffered heavily. On the island of Saint Kitts, a number of homes built on wooden foundations were demolished. Approximately 12 in (300 mm) of rain fell, while barometric pressures fell to 996 mbar (29.4 inHg). Nine deaths were reported, six of which occurred in a schoolhouse collapse. Another five people went missing after the ship Prosperous sank. Thirteen people were killed on the island of Nevis, which reportedly suffered more damage than Saint Kitts. The storm destroyed hundreds of homes on Antigua, including a doctor's home and a "poor house". Government offices, hospitals, and school were also damaged. A reverend who experienced the cyclone remarked that "the whole place is simply wiped out and rendered absolutely destitute. It has to be completely rebuilt."

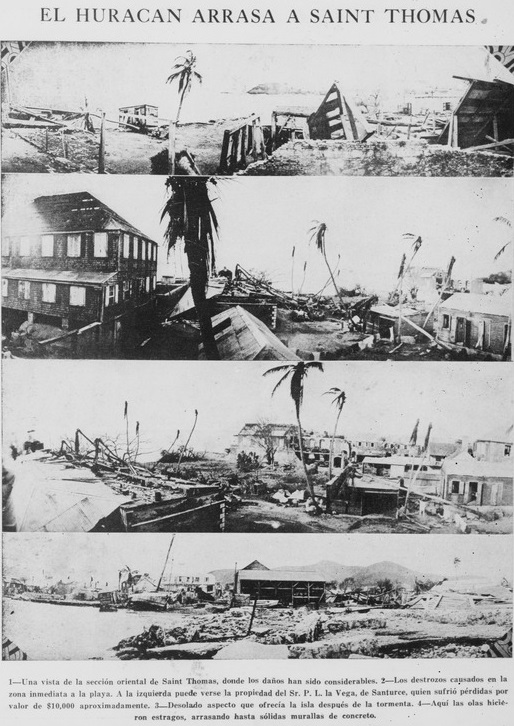
Damage on Saint Thomas

In the United States Virgin Islands, Saint Thomas reported sustained winds of about 90 mph (140 km/h). The hurricane demolished a new breakwater and several warehouses, ruined a naval yard, and capsized barges. One person died on Saint Thomas. Only minimal damage occurred on the nearby island of Saint John. On Saint Croix, barometric pressures fell to as low as 931 mbar (27.5 inHg). Nearly all of the island's 11,000 residents suffered some degree of loss. A total of 170 homes were demolished and 1,264 others were damaged. Additionally, 143 buildings were destroyed, including a sugar mill and a telephone service facility. At the Saint Croix Experiment Station, the cyclone destroyed several agricultural buildings and a few sheds, while also partly deroofing residential structures. Damage to the facility totaled approximately $5,000. The storm resulted in nine deaths on the island. Numerous small craft were beached on Saint Croix and Saint Thomas.

A curator, J. Lawson Illingworth, on Tortola in the British Virgin Islands reported generally minor damage to buildings, along with sustained gale-force winds, 9.14 in (232 mm) of rainfall, and 2.5 ft (0.76 m) above high water mark seas. Some losses of sugar cane and coconuts occurred, especially around Belmont, Road Town, and Sea Cow Bay. Trees were also downed or damaged. Additionally, Illingworth noted that "reports from out islands indicate that damage is little or no worse there."

==== Guadeloupe ====
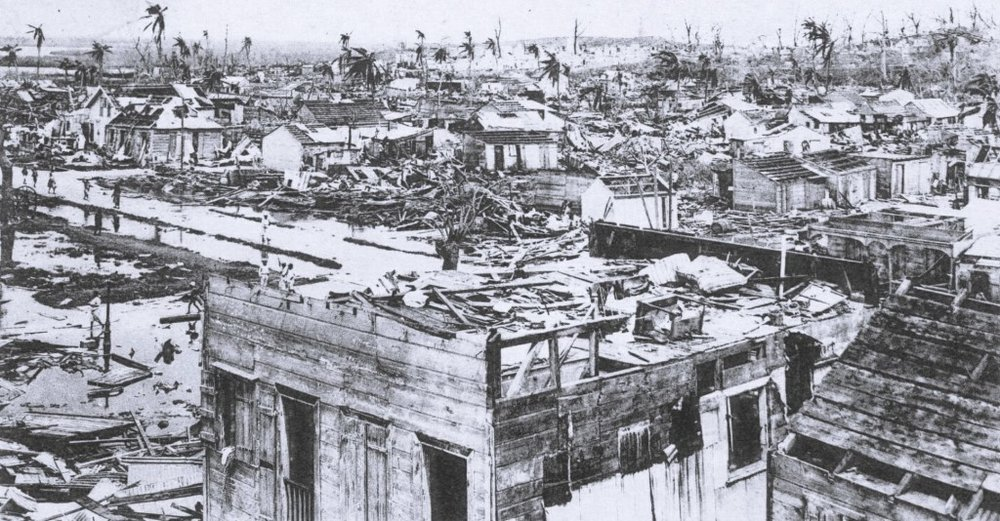
Destruction at Pointe-à-Pitre, Guadeloupe after the storm

Guadeloupe received a direct hit from the storm, apparently with little warning. The hurricane reached the archipelago on September 12 with sustained winds of 140 mph (220 km/h), or Category 4 on the Saffir–Simpson scale. The National Climatic Data Center estimated that the island experienced sustained hurricane-force winds for 16 hours, which likely exceeded 150 mph (240 km/h) at times. Other sources estimated that the storm may have produced wind gusts as high as 186 mph (299 km/h). Barometric pressure on the island fell to as low as 940 mbar (28 inHg) at Pointe-à-Pitre. Storm surge ranged from 13 to 16 ft (4 to 5 m) above ground at Petit Cul-de-sac. About 6.9 in (174 mm) of precipitation fell in two days at Camp-Jacob, located near La Grande Soufrière. However, this is the only rainfall record available on Guadeloupe for this storm.

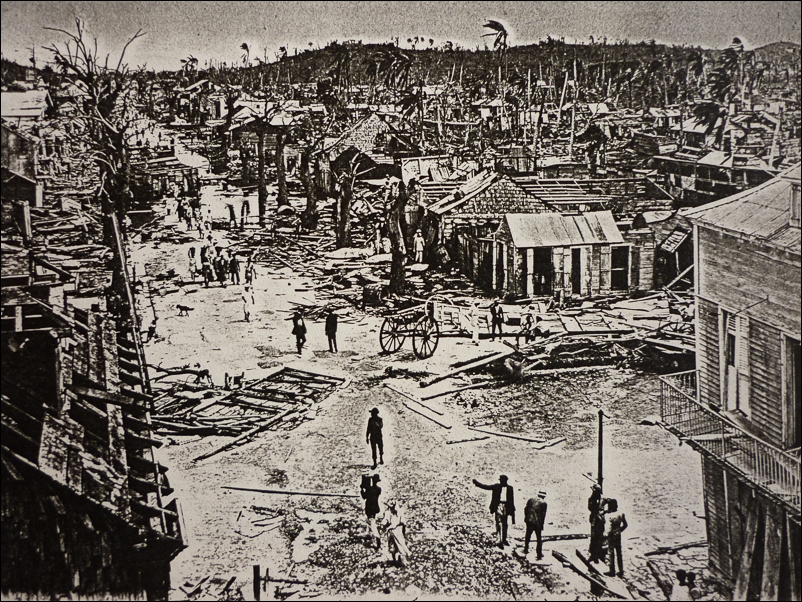
View of the devastation from the hurricane at Faubourg Frébaul in Pointe-à-Pitre

Approximately 85%–95% of banana crops were destroyed, 70%–80% of tree crops suffered severe damage, and 40% of the sugar cane crop was ruined. The people struggled to survive both in the short and longer term after the storm. Damage reports relayed through Paris indicated "great destruction" on the island, while the Journal de la Station agronomique de la Guadeloupe described the main island as "à une zone bombardée" ("a bombed zone"). About three-fourths of the island's residents were left homeless. Multiple sources place the death toll in Guadeloupe at 1,200. However, Reverend Father Louis Quentin estimated that if factors such as disease and living conditions were accounted for, the number of fatalities would exceed 2,000. Damage was estimated at more than 800 million francs ($31.45 million USD) at the time, including 500 million francs ($19.66 million USD) in crop and economic losses, 250 million ($9.82 million USD) to the property, and 40 million ($1.57 million USD)to infrastructure. Throughout Guadeloupe, the hurricane demolished nearly all factories. The municipalities of Le Moule, Morne-à-l'Eau, Pointe-à-Pitre, and Sainte-Rose were the most affected. Almost all of Pointe-à-Pitre was destroyed, notably because of a tidal wave that completely destroyed the structures still standing. The islets around the town were submerged and the houses swept away, with hundreds of deaths in this vicinity, although two barges rescued 30 people. Nine-tenths of the houses were damaged, as were most of the administrative or commercial buildings. The vegetation disappeared. Winds also toppled many telegraph poles and wires and trees, deroofed buildings, and scattered piles of bricks, sheet metal, and wood beams. No homes remained standing after the storm in Le Gosier. In the community of Saint-François, the only structure to remain standing was the police station, which was built with reinforced concrete. In total, 47 people died in Saint-François. To the east of the town, the merchant ship Albotros sank; it had been carrying 80 casks of rum. The crew and the five men attempting to save the ship drowned. Twelve people died at Petit-Canal.

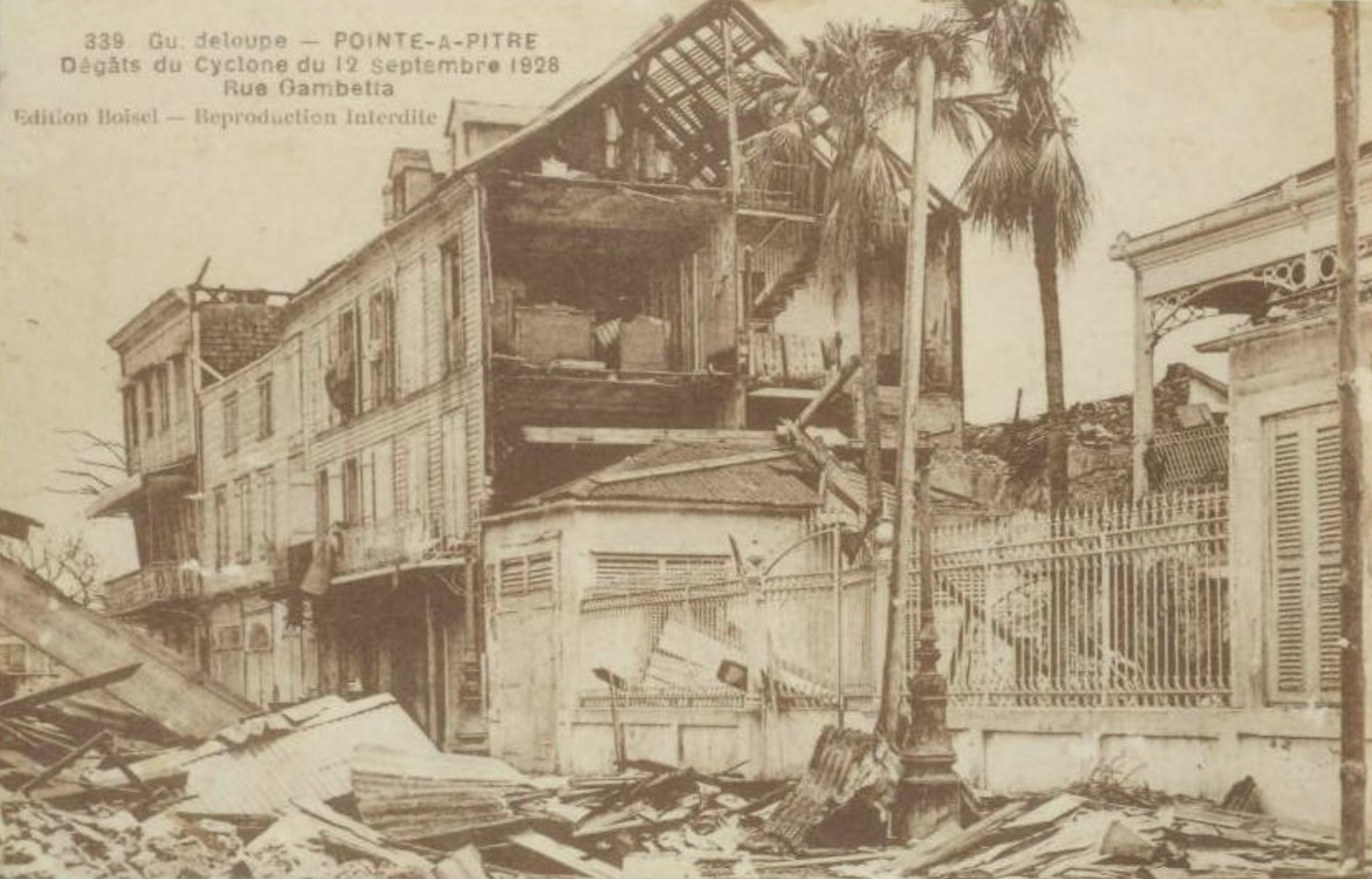
Significant damage to buildings in Pointe-à-Pitre after the hurricane

On La Désirade, a leper hospital patient described the facility as "mis dans un état déplorable" ("left in a deplorable state") and many homes as "réduites en miettes" ("reduced to crumbs") or "en piteux état" ("in a pitiful state"). The hurricane killed 17 people on the island and caused some vessels to be shipwrecked or carried away. On Marie-Galante, a priest at Grand-Bourg estimated that the cyclone destroyed approximately 80% of homes. Another priest in the neighboring commune of Saint-Louis stated that 90% of dwellings there were demolished. Factories in Capesterre, Doro, Grande-Anse, and Pirogue were substantially damaged or nearly destroyed. At least 64 fatalities occurred on the island, including 32 in Grand-Bourg, 19 in Saint-Louis, and 13 in Capesterre. Additionally, the storm deroofed homes and destroyed boats and plantation on Îles des Saintes. On Terre-de-Bas Island, one person perished, thirty-seven homes were damaged, and 101 homes were destroyed, as was a new schoolhouse.

=== Puerto Rico ===
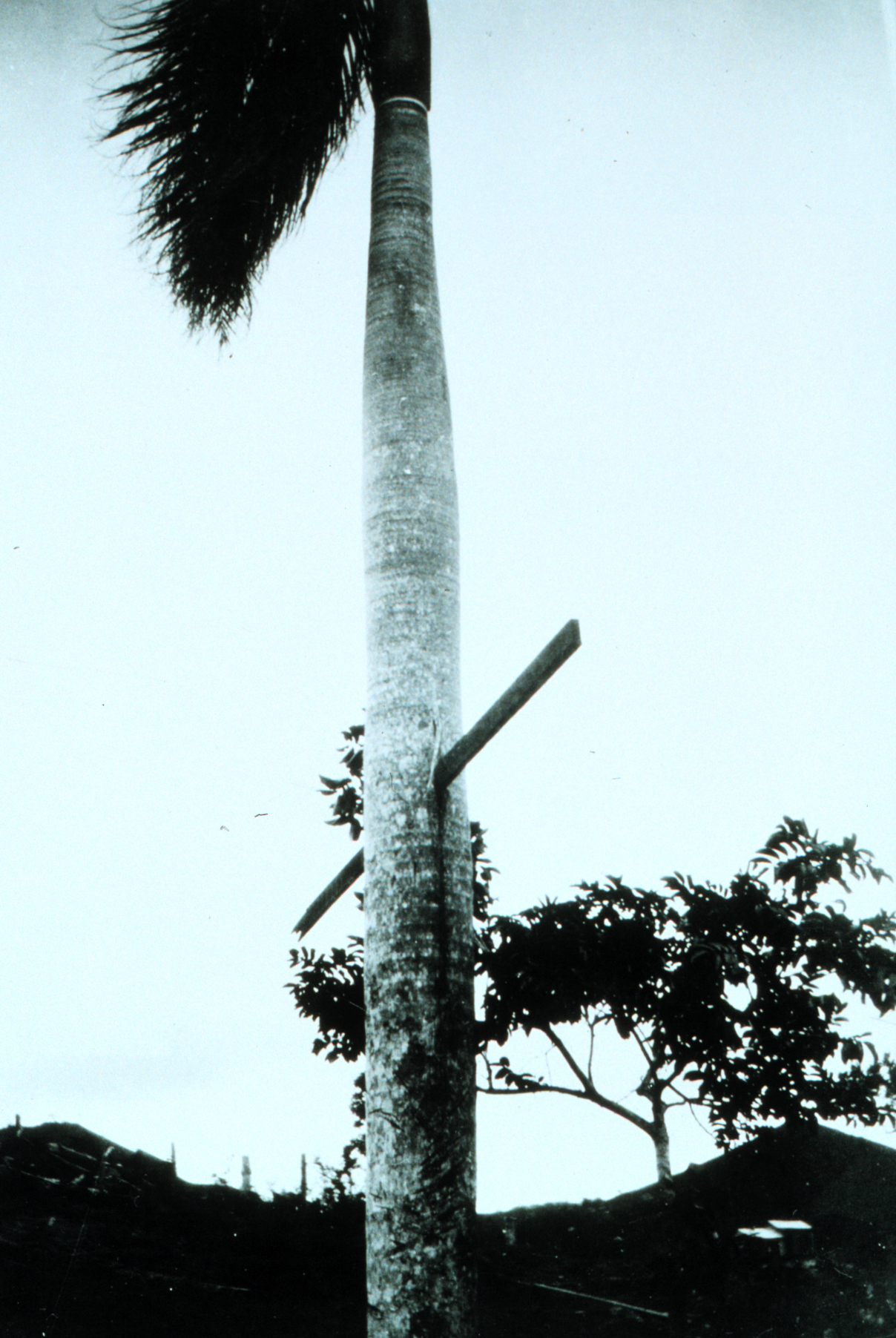
Hurricane-force winds drove this 10-foot (3 m) piece of 2x4 lumber through a palm tree in Puerto Rico

According to the Weather Bureau office in San Juan, the storm was "up to this time the greatest and more [sic] intense and destructive hurricane of record in Puerto Rico." Along the storm path, the eye passed over Guayama, Cayey, and Aibonito, resulting in a period of calm lasting 20 minutes. The island of Puerto Rico received the worst of the storm's winds when the hurricane moved directly across the island at Category 5 strength. The hurricane was extremely large as it crossed Puerto Rico. Hurricane-force winds were measured in Guayama for 18 hours; since the storm is estimated to have been moving at 13 mph (21 km/h), the diameter of the storm's hurricane winds was estimated very roughly to be 234 mi (376 km).

The rainfall observed on September 13–14, 1928, remains the record for the maximum precipitation associated with a hurricane in Puerto Rico within a period of forty-eight hours. In those regions where precipitation is more commonplace, as in Adjuntas in the Cordillera Central and in the Sierra de Luquillo, the rain was over 25 in (640 mm), with 29.60 in (752 mm) recorded in Adjuntas. However, Oliver L. Fassig, director of the Weather Bureau office in San Juan, expressed skepticism about that measurement. In many cases, observation sites may have recorded as little as half of the amount of rain that actually fell, due to high winds.

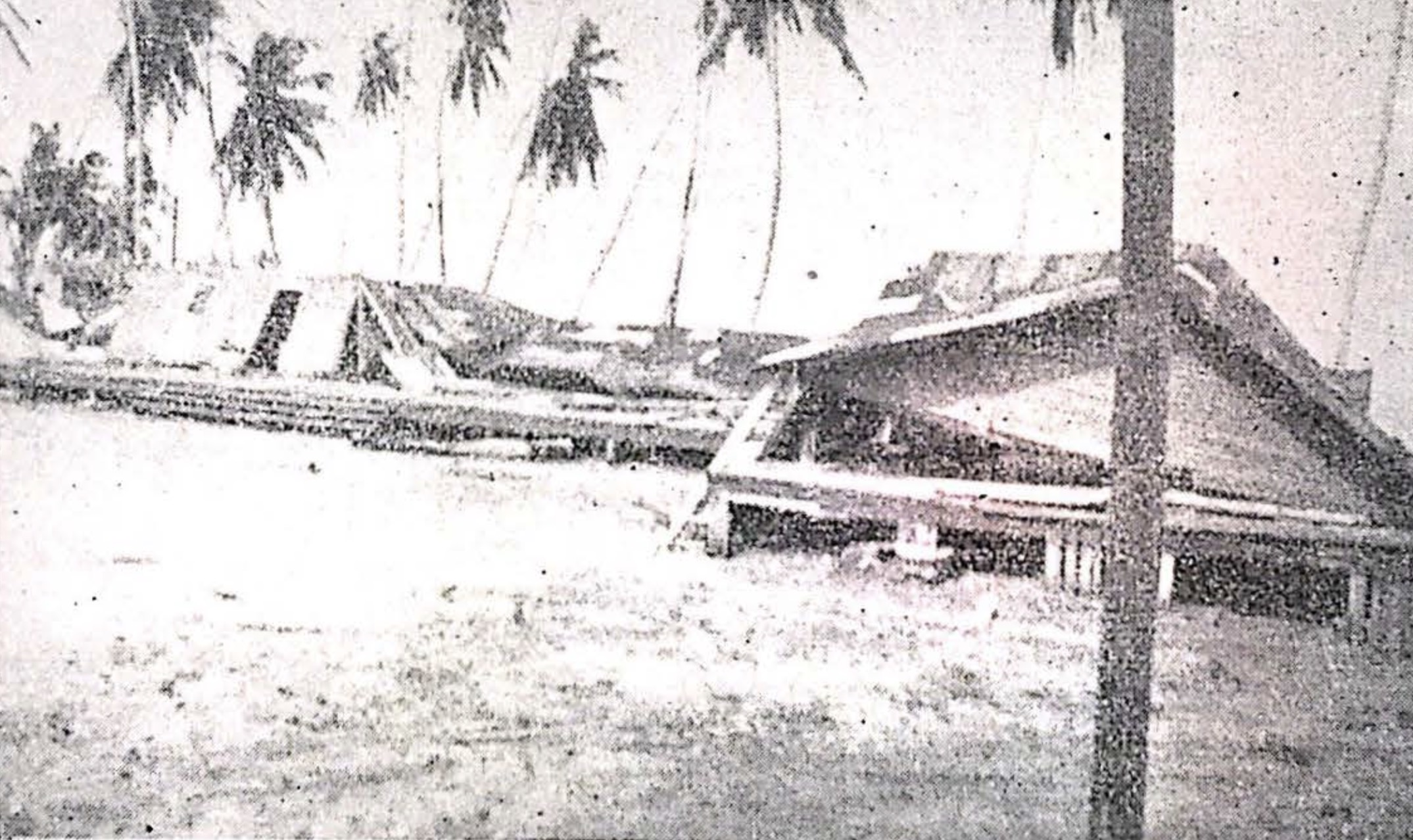
A school destroyed in Aguadilla after the storm

The anemometer located in Puerta de Tierra, a subbarrio of San Juan, lost one of its cups just when it had registered a maximum speed of 150 mph (240 km/h) – a speed that was sustained for five consecutive minutes. Previously the same instrument had measured 160 mph (260 km/h) for one minute. Because these measurements were taken 30 mi (48 km) from San Felipe's eye, at the time, it seemed possible that some estimates of 200 mph (320 km/h) near the center of the storm were not considered an exaggeration. The northeast portion of the island received winds in excess of Category 3 strength, with hurricane-force winds lasting as long as 18 hours.

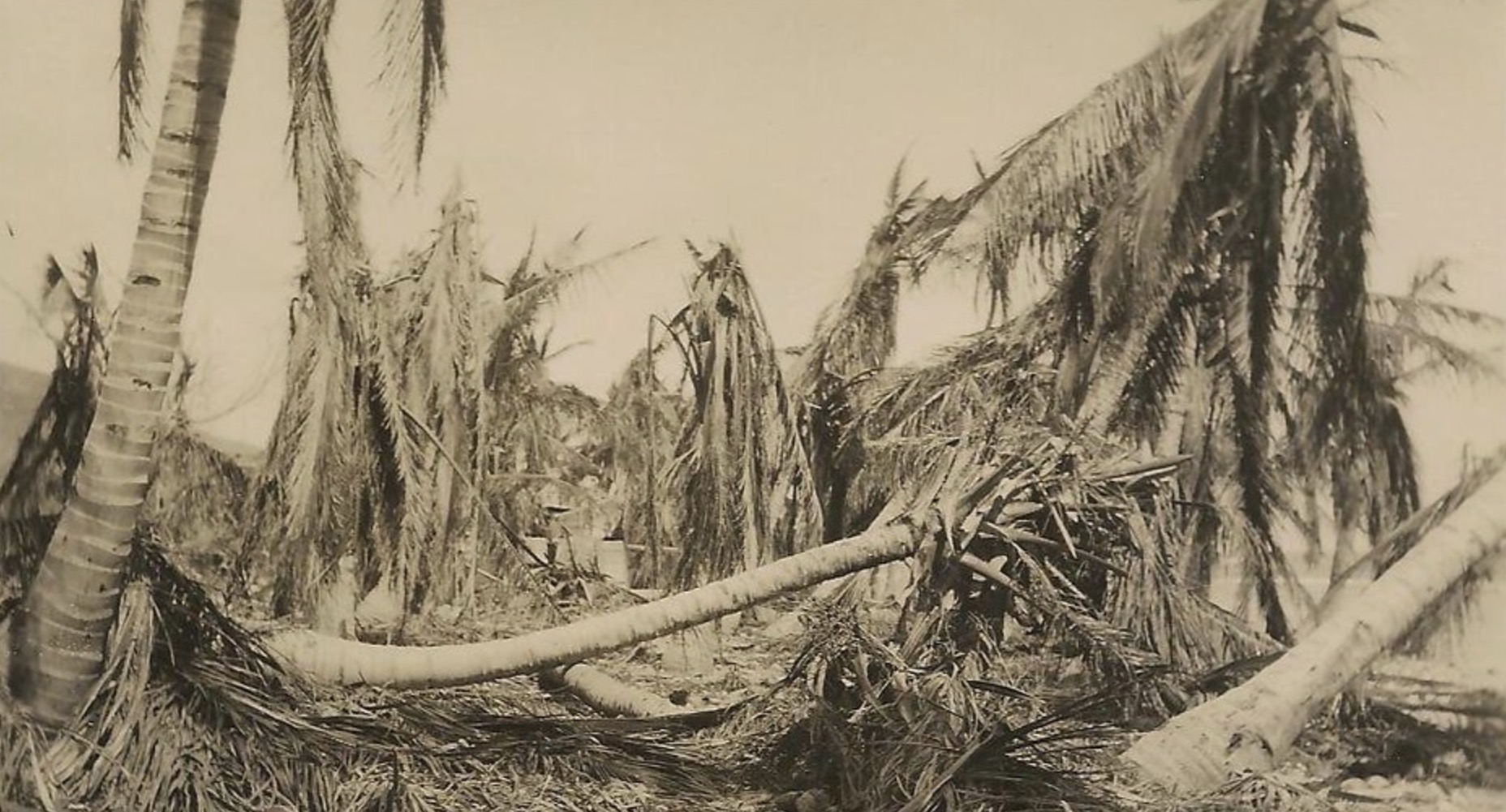
Several downed palm trees in Guayama after the hurricane

There was general destruction throughout Puerto Rico, with the towns where the eye passed being swept away. A telegram from Governor Horace Towner three days after the hurricane noted, "practically half of towns completely destroyed. Small houses in country [sic] blown away... Probably half population [sic] homeless." Official reports stated "several hundred thousand" people were left homeless. On the island there were virtually no buildings not affected by the hurricane. Reports say that 24,728 homes were destroyed and 192,444 were partially destroyed, while the American Red Cross noted that the hurricane demolished 97,950 buildings and damaged 56,117 others. Of the school buildings, 770 were destroyed or damaged. Communications were impacted by fallen trees, landslides, and damaged bridges.

Wettest tropical cyclones and their remnants in Puerto Rico Highest-known totals
Precipitation			Storm	Location	Ref.
Rank	mm	in	Storm	Location	Ref.
1	1,058.7	41.68	Fifteen 1970	Jayuya 1 SE	
2	962.7	37.90	Maria 2017	Caguas	
3	845.6	33.29	Eloise 1975	Dos Bocas	
4	822.9	32.40	Fiona 2022	Marueno	
5	804.4	31.67	Isabel 1985	Toro Negro Forest	
6	775.0	30.51	Georges 1998	Jayuya	
7	751.8	29.60	San Felipe II 1928	Adjuntas	
8	662.2	26.07	Hazel 1954	Toro Negro Tunnel	
9	652.5	25.69	Klaus 1984	Guavate Camp	
10	596.4	23.48	Hortense 1996	Cayey 1 NW	

According to some contemporary estimates, excluding personal losses, the damages reached $85.312 million, equivalent to about 25% of Puerto Rico's gross domestic product and more than sevenfold larger than the territory's contemporary annual budget. Property damage accounted for approximately $50 million of that total, while the Porto Rico Railway, Light & Power Co. experienced roughly $3 million in damage, including the destruction of two of its plants in Comerío. San Felipe II is officially classified as Puerto Rico's biggest, worst, and most devastating hurricane to ever have impacted the island.

Multiple sources list the death toll in Puerto Rico as a result of the hurricane at 312. A municipality-by-municipality tally compiled by September 19 listed 60 deaths in Cayey; 50 in Humacao; 29 in Comerio; 18 in Aibonito; 15 in Arecibo; 12 in Utuado; 10 each in Aguadilla and Naguabo; 9 each in Barranquitas and Coamo; 5 each in Las Piedras, Ponce, and Vega Baja; 4 in Toa Alta; 3 each in Ciales, Fajardo, and Gurabo; 2 each in Ceiba, Hatillo, and Vieques; and 1 each in Camuy, Dorado, Juana Díaz, Juncos, Manati, and Trujillo Alto. However, this total was regarded as incomplete because only 28 out of the then-77 municipalities in Puerto Rico had provided information on casualties by that time. Furthermore, contemporary estimates of the death toll were much higher, up to 1,000, a figure that the Associated Press regarded as conservative. In addition to the human fatalities, at least 311,202 animals died as a result of the cyclone.

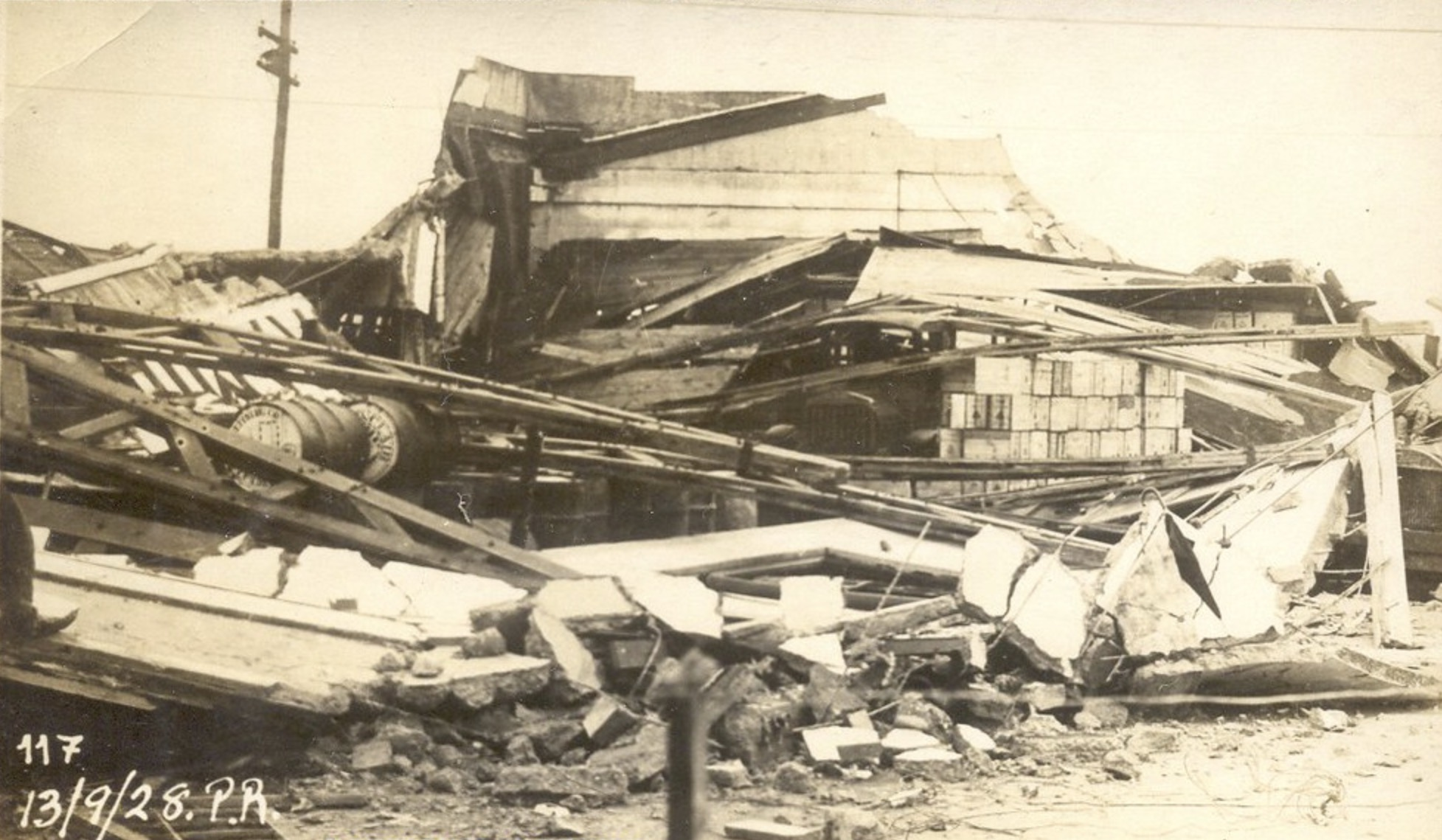
A destroyed building in Puerto Rico after the hurricane

Some sugar mills that had cost millions of dollars to build were reduced to rubble. Most of the sugarcane fields were flooded, ruining the year's crops. Half of the coffee plants and half of the shade trees that covered these were destroyed; almost all of the coffee harvest was lost. The coffee industry would take years to recover since coffee needs shade trees to grow. Valued at $15 million, the crop in 1928 was the largest in 10 years and almost entirely presold to Europe. Mudslides and intense winds also caused the loss of at least 150,000 citrus trees. The tobacco farms also had great losses. After this hurricane, Puerto Rico never regained its position as a major coffee exporter.

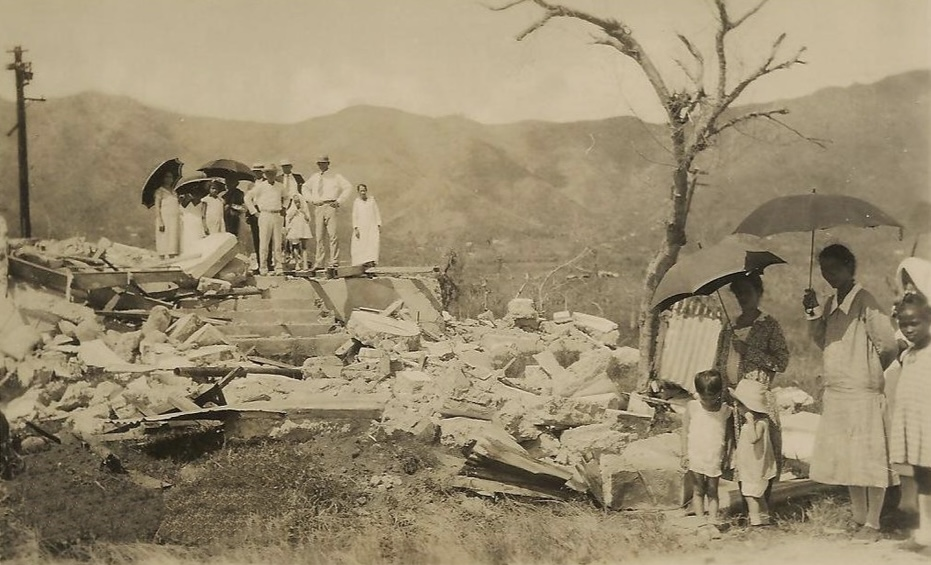
People gather around the remains of a destroyed house from the hurricane in Guayama

In Guayama, near where the storm made landfall, many people sought refuge in an under-construction church. However, the walls collapsed, causing 14 deaths. Strong winds in Ponce destroyed many frame homes, leaving about 700 people homeless, and a hospital. Trees were downed throughout the area, blocking roads and traffic. Electrical, telegraph, and phone services were interrupted. Heavy rainfall ruined coffee and sugar cane crops, while low-lying areas were inundated. Cayey remained isolated for eight days due to roads being blocked by floodwaters or fallen telephone and telegraph equipment. The hurricane demolished homes and wrecked many buildings at the naval radio station at Henry Barracks. All crops in farmlands surrounding Cayey were ruined. In Aibonito, the cyclone destroyed 456 tobacco ranches and rendered 806 people homeless. A switchboard operator who stayed at her post in Coamo died during the storm. At the experiment station in Mayagüez, the hurricane unroofed many buildings and rendered some residential structures uninhabitable, while many crops were destroyed. Damage to the station totaled about $10,000.

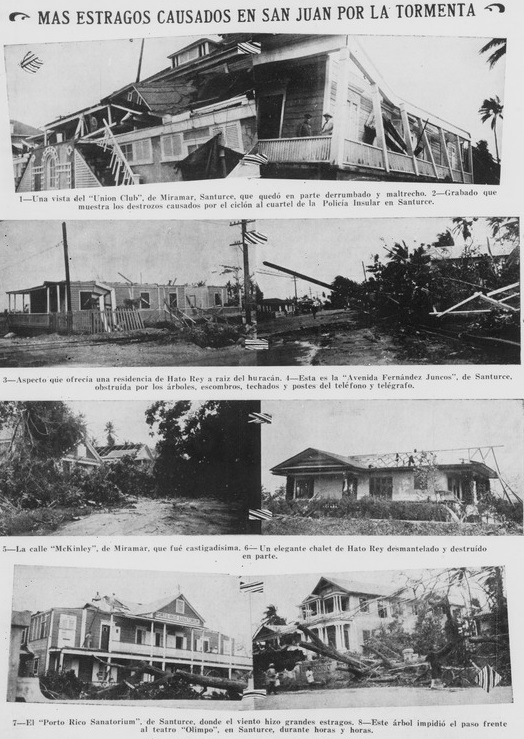
Damage in San Juan

Winds in San Juan were estimated to have reached 150 mph (240 km/h). The Weather Bureau office observed winds up to 132 mph (212 km/h), but the anemometer blew away. Ultimately, the hurricane destroyed the Weather Bureau office itself and a shed housing weather balloons, with Fassig reporting that only a toilet remained. Throughout San Juan, the storm destroyed 70% of dwellings and 30% of businesses. Other buildings such as hospitals, a hotel, and the union club lost their roofs. Many trees were uprooted, while local banana, coconut, and coffee plantations were flattened. The RCA antenna fell, disrupting communications between San Juan and New York City, New York. The water supply for San Juan and nearby towns was disrupted.

La Princesa was mostly leveled, with over 2,000 people left homeless in that section of San Juan. Heavy rainfall in the area flooded La Fortaleza, the executive residence of the governor of Puerto Rico. The building also suffered damage to its doors and windows, while the trees in the garden were toppled. The southern portion of the city experienced considerable destruction. Severe flooding occurred at the San Juan Exchange, while miles of telephone wires toppled. In the now-former municipality of Río Piedras, which is today a section of San Juan, medical buildings housing 300 tuberculosis patients and 70 lepers were almost completely destroyed. The chancellor of the University of Puerto Rico reported that all but two buildings at its Río Piedras campus suffered damage, at a cost of approximately $300,000.

=== Greater Antilles ===
After affecting Puerto Rico, the hurricane passed just north of the Dominican Republic, inflicting mostly minor impact, due to the small core of the storm and weaker winds to the south of the center. Nonetheless, the cyclone deroofed some homes and damaged a few ships around Puerto Plata. Immense precipitation caused the Yaque del Norte River to overflow at Santiago de los Caballeros, prompting several families in the low-lying areas to flee to higher ground. The city lost electricity and telephone service. Heavy rains fell around Cap-Haïtien, Haiti. In Cuba, abnormally high tides generated by the storm sent interrupted shipping and pushed water above the Malecón seawall.

== Aftermath ==
=== British Leeward Islands ===
Leeward Islands Governor Eustace Fiennes created a committee to assess damage on each of the British-controlled islands. The West India Committee Circular announced on October 4 that the Leeward Islands treasury had already contributed £5,000 (1928 UKP) in aid. By that same date, the governments of Trinidad and Grenada had donated £3,000 and £750, respectively, to the British Leeward Islands. Trinidad also created a collection fund that raised over £10,500 for the British Leeward Islands and Guadeloupe by October 11. Despite Antigua experiencing significant damage, people on that island quickly sent clothing and food to Montserrat. The latter also received £10,000 and a loan of £5,000 from the British government.

=== Guadeloupe ===
With rumors circulating that the French West Indies might be offered to the United States in exchange for assistance in rebuilding after World War I, the government of France mounted a significant response to the hurricane, although outside aid did not arrive in Guadeloupe for five days, when a boat from Martinique brought medicine and food. Another large vessel, the H. M. S. Colombo, traveled to the island from Barbados with a cargo of flour. Early on, Guadeloupe Governor Théophile Antoine Pascal Tellier enacted a curfew to deter looting, as many incidents had been reported. Additionally, on September 14, Governor Tellier created three commissions, including one for assessing damage in each commune and another responsible for distributing relief. A subsidy of 100 million francs ($3.93 million USD) was voted on September 26, 1928, by the French parliament to assist Guadeloupe. Funds were also released in the form of loans or donations (some of which came from war reparations owed by Germany following the First World War). In total, 420 million francs ($16.51 million USD) were reportedly made available to Guadeloupe following the hurricane. Aid was able to arrive quickly, coming from other spared regions of Guadeloupe, but also from the solidarity of other Caribbean islands, the mainland, and other French colonies.

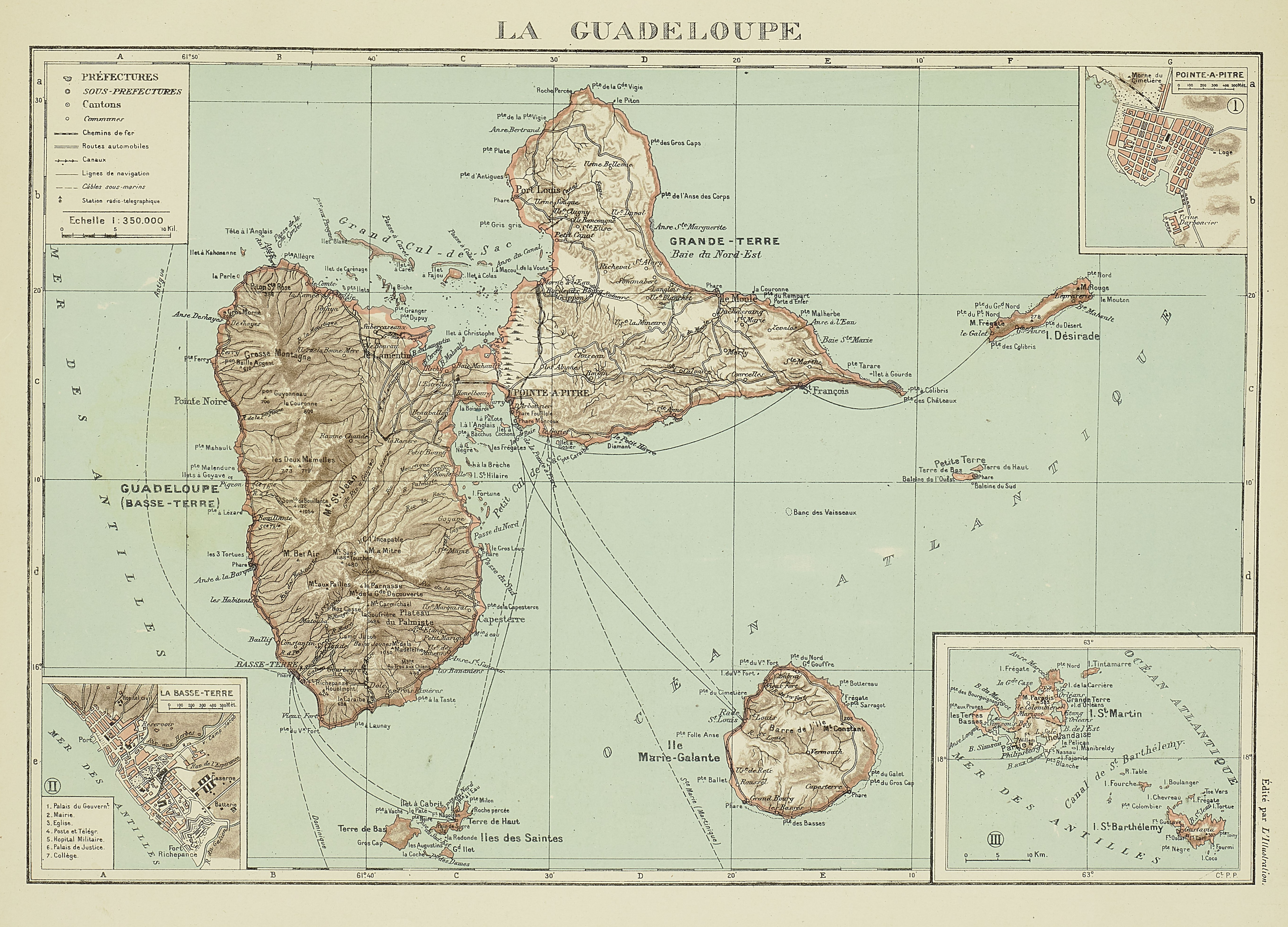
A 1929 map of Guadeloupe

The aid also revived the sugar industry, while bananas became a more prominent crop than coffee and cocoa due to better resistance to storms and more profitability. Although sugar exports had already declined in 1926 and 1927, 1928 marked the year of the lowest amount of sugar being shipped out of Guadeloupe. Rums and coffee also saw sharp declines in export, although the latter in 1929 and 1930 because the 1928 crop had already been harvested. The former's price fell by 60% between 1929 and 1936, while the cost of sugar decreased by 40% during that same period of time. Consequently, agricultural wages also fell. Ruined crops, as well as the destruction of factories and ports, caused exports from Guadeloupe to decline more than 47 million francs ($1.85 million USD) in the first three quarters of 1929 from the same time in 1927. Between 1929 and 1931, imports to Guadeloupe exceeded its exports. Exports of crops gradually increased in the 1930s following the construction of 30 ft (9 m)-tall concrete quays at ports, but subsequent events such as the start of the Great Depression in 1929, droughts in 1930 and 1931, and an Allied blockade during World War II delayed recovery.

In Grand-Bourg alone, 890 people received some form of assistance in the aftermath of the hurricane by November 23. However, food shortages persisted there, leading commune mayor Furcie Tirolien to issue a decree in August 1929 to set the prices of food. Additionally, low wages for farmers and factory workers on Marie-Galante, combined with living conditions following the storm, led some people to relocate elsewhere in the country, namely Pointe-à-Pitre. Also in 1929, the communes of Grand-Bourg and Saint-Louis were both granted 80,000 francs and 45,000 francs ($3,145 and $1,769), respectively, to repair and maintain roads.

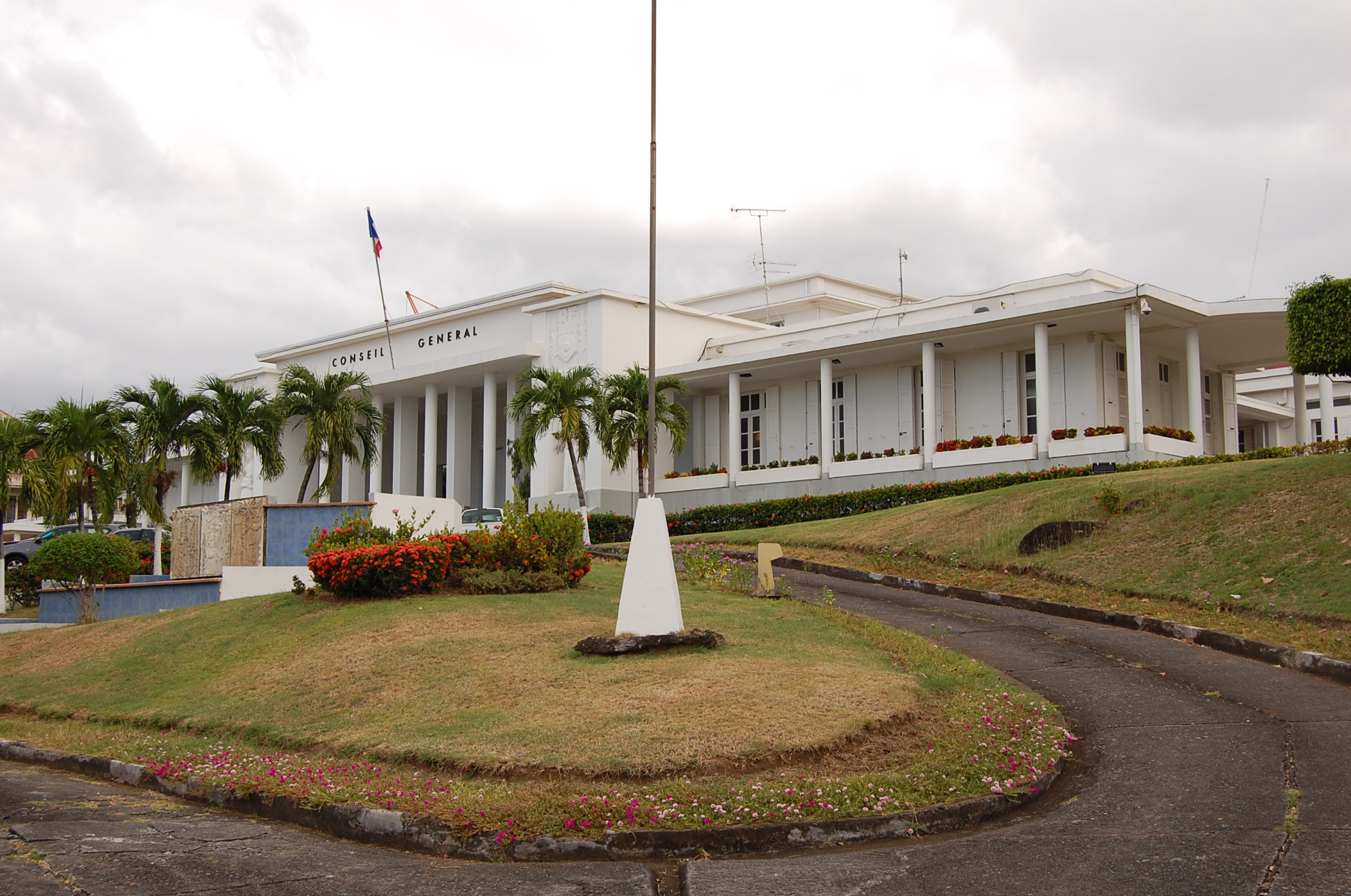
The General Council Building in Basse-Terre, designed by Ali Tur

Dr. Bourgarel ordered inmates at a Pointe-à-Pitre prison to bury 800 to 900 bodies with lime to prevent epidemics. These efforts led to Dr. Bourgarel receiving a grand gold medal for epidemics from the Pasteur Institute and a gold medal for courage and devotion.

Pointe-à-Pitre was rebuilt under a major public works program with the intention of beautifying the island to mark the tricentennial of France annexing parts of the Lesser Antilles. However, between the hurricane and 1938, when Félix Éboué departed office as the governor of Guadeloupe, the number of shacks increased significantly in the suburbs of Pointe-à-Pitre, while disorderly expansion occurred within the city itself. Unsanitary conditions, as well as stagnant waters, in the suburbs led to epidemics. Nonetheless, construction projects in Pointe-à-Pitre led to many job opportunities in the aftermath of the hurricane, which was especially enticing to people who migrated from rural areas. Additionally, some masons from Italy immigrated to Guadeloupe to assist with rebuilding efforts, a trend that continued until 1933. The French Minister of Colonies hired architect Ali Tur to rebuild government buildings on Guadeloupe. In addition to creating non-traditional styles, Tur also introduced reinforced concrete. Designing approximately 100 edifices within eight years, Tur's work expanded to other types of buildings, including churches, hospitals, and schools.

In the EchoGéo journal in 2020, Jérémy Desarthe argued that "si la manne financière octroyée au lendemain du cyclone a bénéficié à l'industrie sucrière et a permis une restructuration rapide de la filière ... les mesures dédiées aux populations sinistrées ne semblent pas avoir été pleinement satisfaisantes." ("while the financial windfall granted in the aftermath of the cyclone benefited the sugar industry and enabled a rapid restructuring of the sector ... the measures dedicated to the affected populations do not seem to have been fully satisfactory."). For example, Gratien Candace, a member of the Chamber of Deputies, wrote a letter in May 1929 in which he described widespread cases of filariasis and malaria and many instances of middle-class workers in the suburbs residing in shacks.

The American Red Cross also offered aid to Guadeloupe. As the organization prepared to send $10,000 to William Henry Hunt, an unknown employee of the United States Department of State sent a note warning the American Red Cross to not trust black people with such an amount of money. Hunt was black. Instead, the note suggested "the governor of Guadeloupe, a white Frenchman from continental France, would seem to be the appropriate person to handle the money... a man of integrity and long service in the colonial career." United States Secretary of State Frank B. Kellogg wrote to Hunt that "you should be careful to turn it over to the most responsible officially constituted relief organization on the island." Ultimately, the French declined the offer from the American Red Cross.

=== United States territories ===
Strongest landfalling Atlantic U.S. hurricanes^{†}
Rank	Name^{‡}	Season	Wind speed	
Rank	Name^{‡}	Season	mph	km/h
1	"Labor Day"	1935	185	295
2	Camille	1969	175	280
3	Andrew	1992	165	270
4	"San Felipe II"*	1928	160	260
4	Michael	2018	160	260
6	Maria	2017	155	250
7	"Last Island"	1856	150	240
7	"Indianola"	1886	150	240
7	"Florida Keys"	1919	150	240
7	"Freeport"	1932	150	240
7	Charley	2004	150	240
7	Laura	2020	150	240
7	Ida	2021	150	240
7	Ian	2022	150	240
Source: NHC, AOML/HRD
^{†}Strength refers to maximum sustained wind speed upon striking land.
^{‡}Systems prior to 1950 were not officially named.
*Name given to the storm at its peak landfall.

In the United States Virgin Islands (USVI), the American Red Cross conducted most of their recovery operations on Saint Croix due to the storm passing near that island. Overall, the organization provided food to 852 families, clothing to 320 families, and building materials to or assistance in reconstructing the residences of 262 families. Among the building materials sent by the Red Cross were "125 square feet [11.6129 square meters] of galvanized corrugated iron sheets, 100,000 broad feet [30,480 meters] of roof sheeting, and 140,000 broad feet [42,672 meters] of assorted lumber", as noted by Eliot Kleinberg. In monetary terms, the Red Cross spent just over $34,500 in aid to the USVI.

Among the individuals who assisted with relief efforts in the USVI was Casper Holstein, a Saint Croix native who became a mobster, philanthropist, and businessman in the Harlem neighborhood of New York City. As Holstein had done after a hurricane in 1924, he again established a relief fund for the USVI. Holstein sent a shipload of lumber to the islands. He was supposed to lead a meeting on September 23 about fundraising for victims of the storm. However, on September 21, a group of men kidnapped Holstein, who had $7,000 in his possession, which he apparently intended to use as money for aid. The group released Holstein on September 24, after unsuccessfully attempting to ransom him.

On September 14, the day after the hurricane struck Puerto Rico, the wife of Governor Horace M. Towner led an effort to establish two emergency hospitals and distribution stations for clothing and food throughout the San Juan area. The United States Department of War quickly ordered the ships St. Mihiel and Kenowis, initially bound for the Panama Canal Zone, to head to Puerto Rico instead. Groups of citizens in San Juan recommended that Governor Towner declare martial law. Although he refused to do so, Governor Towner issued an order on September 18 to deploy a total of approximately 2,000 National Guard personnel to 23 municipalities in an effort to quell profiteering and looting.

The Times of San Juan criticized Governor Towner on September 18, noting that President Calvin Coolidge called on September 14 "to take charge of the relief commission on this island ... thus showing that the President in Washington was so much better informed than our own governor, whose cables to the United States were all filed nearly ninety-six hours after the storm." However, in a radiogram that day, September 18, Governor Towner stated, "communication of some kind already has been restored with all parts of the island. Roads are nearly cleared. Supplies can be sent to interior points." That same newspaper reported that in some cases, price gouging more than quintupled the cost of corrugated zinc, tripled the price of construction materials, and more than doubled the cost of candles.

In addition to aid that would arrive via the American Red Cross, Masonic lodges across the Americas raised almost $84,000 for Puerto Rico, $51,000 of which came from a national fund. Puerto Rico received monetary contributions from Colombia, Cuba, and the Dominican Republic, whose president, Horacio Vásquez, ordered that fruits and vegetables be shipped to the island.

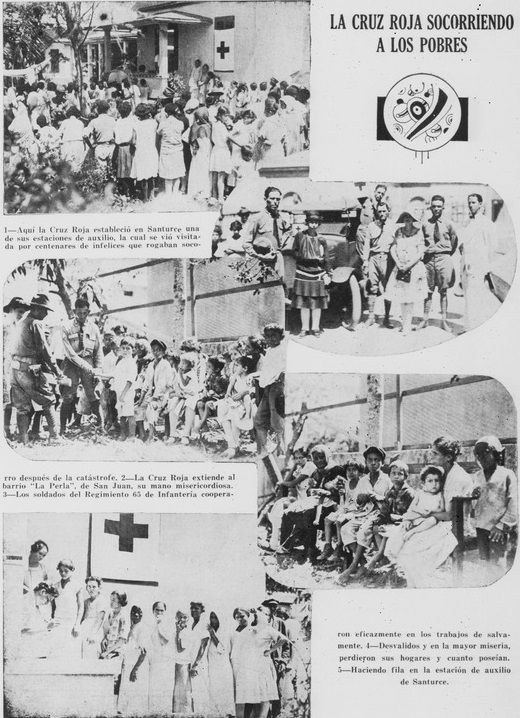
The American Red Cross in Puerto Rico after the storm

Relief expenditures by the American Red Cross for the USVI and Puerto Rico combined exceeded $3.2 million, with the vast majority of that total being received by the latter. This included almost $1.4 million for building materials, just under $694,000 for agricultural programs, nearly $526,000 for food, about $185,000 for grants to local Red Cross chapters, close to $164,000 for clothing, around $148,700 for administrative expenses, and approximately $70,500 for medical services, among other recovery costs. Within Puerto Rico alone, 4,145 people volunteered for the organization, which distributed food to 128,513 families, clothing to 65,901 families, and building material to 37,344 families, which included almost 19,000,000 ft (5,800,000 m) of lumber, about 6,400,000 lb (2,900,000 kg) of zinc roofing, more than 1,000,000 lb (450,000 kg) of nails, nearly 37,000 lb (17,000 kg) of roofing rolls, and almost 40,000 hinges. The Red Cross also sent an initial shipment of 2,000,000 lb (910,000 kg) of beans, flour, pork, and salt; roughly 36,000 blankets, 5,000 cots, and almost 1,000 tents. Overall, by February 28, 1929, had shipped millions of pounds of beans, dried codfish, and rice, as well as roughly 1,500,000 lb (680,000 kg) of other food provisions and additives.

A Red Cross coffee cleanup program, employing approximately 67,000 men at its peak, cleared and restored about 213,000 acres (86,000 ha) of coffee farmland and successfully planted about 10 million seedlings on Puerto Rico. Prior to the coffee cleanup program, the organization distributed seeds for several different types of vegetables and crops, especially beans and corn, to 14,562 families. Additionally, rural schools depending on gardens to supply food also received seeds. Overall, coffee growers accounted for about 96% of loans dispersed by the Puerto Rico Hurricane Relief Loan Section from 1929 to 1943. Despite efforts to replant coffee, Laird W. Bergad argued in the Latin American Research Review in 1978 that both the hurricane and the beginning of the Great Depression spelled the end of coffee being a major industry on Puerto Rico. In contrast, the production of sugar increased by 50% between 1928 and 1934, which primarily fueled the 26% increase in the agricultural output index during that same time period.

Within about three weeks of the hurricane, All America Cables Company laid a telegraph cable from the Dominican Republic to San Juan, Puerto Rico. Previously, the cable connected the Dominican Republic to Puerto Rico, first at Ponce, where a landline then reached San Juan. The landline between Ponce and San Juan "was restored only at much expense," also by early October, according to The New York Times.

News agencies reported the occurrences of riots in Puerto Rico. However, police chief George W. Lewis wrote in a letter that he instead observed "more than half a million homeless at work constructing emergency huts in which temporarily to gain shelter." In spite of the hurricane, wages and the rate of employment increased to higher levels in Puerto Rico by the end of 1928 than before the storm. However, this would not last, as the Great Depression caused rates of unemployment and homelessness to skyrocket, with the former ranging from 36% to 66%. Due to the economic downturn and natural disasters such as the 1928 hurricane, nearly 225,000 people relocated from rural areas to urban areas, a trend that former Puerto Rico House of Representatives member Natalio Bayonet Díaz desperately wanted to prevent.

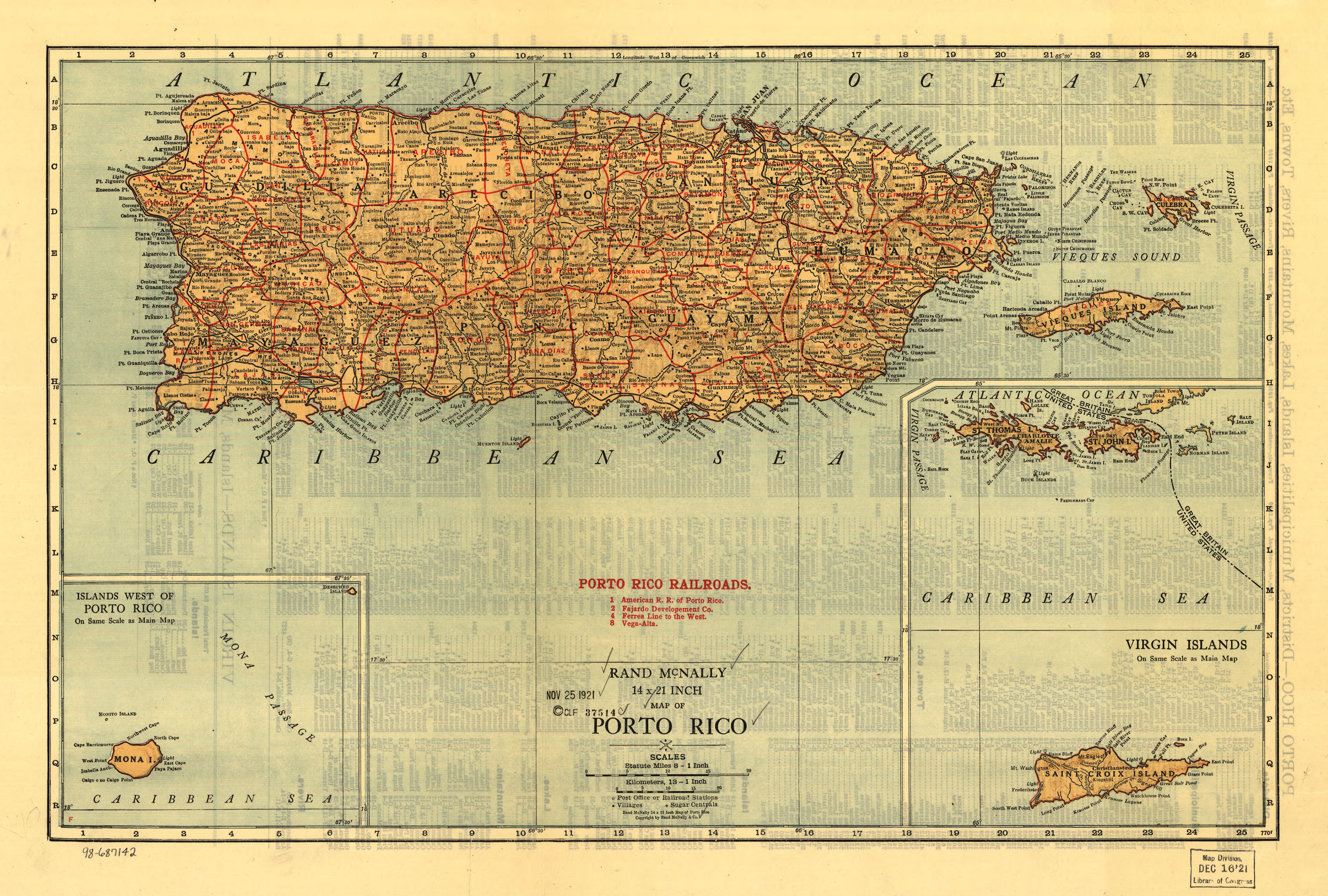
A detailed 1921 map of U.S. territories in the Caribbean

Although many schools sustained major damage or were destroyed, Puerto Rico Secretary of Education Juan Bernardo Huyke ordered that sessions resume regardless of the conditions of the buildings. Thus, about 90% of schools soon resumed classes, whether in open air, roofless buildings, or inside other structures.

Compared to the same period of 1927, influenza cases on Puerto Rico increased nearly forty-fold, tetanus cases increased more than five-fold, and malaria and typhoid cases more than doubled. Consequently, the Insular Health Department and the Red Cross also provided hundreds of thousands to millions of antitoxins and vaccines for protection against diphtheria, tetanus, and typhoid. To combat other health-related issues, the Red Cross treated 7,801 persons by December 1928, provided assistance to 14 hospitals, and established 14 other hospitals. For example, the organization built a 90-bed hospital in Aguadilla. The Red Cross report noted that by March 1929, "general health conditions over the island were better than normal, owing to extensive immunization." For the USVI, Puerto Rico, and the mainland United States combined, the Red Cross received more than $5.9 million in contributions. A total of 7,801 people received medical treatment from the Red Cross.

Police reported that many citizens of Puerto Rico experienced despair and grief. By September 18, at least four people were known to have committed suicide, while four others made an attempt to kill themselves. The 1928 hurricane and the 1932 San Ciprián hurricane also likely left health impacts on the children of survivors born in the years immediately after the storms, according to a study published in the Economics and Human Biology journal in 2013. More specifically, the study argued that socioeconomic status and living conditions in the aftermath of the cyclones led to individuals born in 1929 and 1933 having noticeably higher rates of high cholesterol, diabetes, and hypertension, which aligned with the fetal origins hypothesis.

By early October, Governor Towner realized that funds from the Red Cross and the insular treasury were short of allowing Puerto Rico to make a full recovery. Consequently, he appealed to Congress for additional aid, particularly Senator Hiram Bingham III and Representative Edgar R. Kiess, both of whom chaired committees on insular affairs in their respective chambers. Senator Bingham and Representative Kiess then spent 10 days in Puerto Rico in November, meeting with business and industry interests, political leaders, civic organizations, Governor Towner, and Attorney General James R. Beverley. In December, Senator Bingham and Representative Kiess argued to Congress for $24 million, presenting images and testimonies of the devastation. However, Darien Brahms dissertation noted that "the hearings were stalled by a contingent of midwestern politicians who debated whether Puerto Ricans as an ethnic group were equipped to repair their nation should they receive federal assistance." As a method of rebutting these members of Congress, Elizabeth K. Van Deusen, wife of the secretary to the governor of Puerto Rico, stated that black and mulatto people comprised only a small portion of the population, instead describing 73% of Puerto Ricans as whites "mostly of pure Spanish descent." Governor Towner and Van Deusen both also argued that the white elites possessed the most capability of rebuilding the island. Ultimately, Congress approved a much smaller appropriation than requested, allocating $10 million, primarily in increments of interest-free loans valued at $25,000 to elite planters. Furthermore, distribution of these loans occurred slowly, with only about 500 approved by one year after the hurricane.

In January 1929, President Coolidge recommended that Congress add more appropriations for services and projects under the purview of the United States Department of Agriculture, including allocating $45,000 to construct a new Weather Bureau office building in San Juan, Puerto Rico. A new concrete block building eventually opened, designed by Albert B. Nicholson in 1930. The Weather Bureau remained at the location until 1946, at which time it was moved to the Isla Grande Airport. The United States Navy did not reuse Henry Barracks in Cayey and instead moved to the Isla Grande Airport to establish a naval air station there in 1929. Henry Barracks soon became a United States Army base, which remained in use until 1965.

Overall, Puerto Rico "had barely dug out from under the storm damage when it fell victim to the effects of the world-wide [Great] depression," according to Harvey S. Perloff in The Journal of Economic History in 1952. President Herbert Hoover expressed similar sentiment in January 1930 when he urged Congress to approve $3 million for the relief loan fund because Puerto Rico was "still suffering from the effects of the disastrous hurricane of September 13, 1928. There exists a real and immediate need for appropriating these funds in order to alleviate the distress due to unemployment on the island and to enable the Commission to continue its farm rehabilitation program." However, the United States House of Representatives rejected this appropriation.

A graduate thesis authored by Geoff G. Burrows argued that recovery was not even close to being complete when the 1932 San Ciprián hurricane struck Puerto Rico. Burrows also posited that the rebuilding methods undertaken by the American Red Cross, the Puerto Rico Emergency Relief Administration (PRERA), and local governments contributed to an ongoing problem with slums on the island, with homes constructed after the 1928 and 1932 hurricanes already in disrepair by the mid-1930s. Similarly, Jacob Crane argued in the International Labour Review in 1944 that relief efforts by the Red Cross "did not effect any measurable improvement in the standards of low income housing, sanitation, and land tenure." The Puerto Rico Reconstruction Administration, which replaced the PRERA, then hired workers to construct 4,290 concrete dwellings and build concrete storm sewers, an incinerating plant, and a new water utility system, while also erecting temporary housing for the workers. Brahms noted that working-class Puerto Ricans received very direct assistance from the American Red Cross in terms of rebuilding and housing, as the organization had put "their faith in the paternalistic system already in place before" the storm, in which plantation owners possessed about 82.2% of homes that rural workers lived in.

== See also ==
- Effects of the 1928 Okeechobee hurricane in Florida
- 1899 San Ciriaco hurricane
- 1932 San Ciprian hurricane
- Hurricane Georges
- Hurricane Hugo
