= Furcie Tirolien =

Furcie Tirolien (January 30, 1886 in Grand-Bourg, Guadeloupe – August 28, 1981 in Grand-Bourg) was a politician from Guadeloupe. He served in the French National Assembly from 1951 to 1958.
