= Armand Jean-François =

Armand Jean-François (born 7 March 1874 in Grand-Bourg, Guadeloupe; died 22 September 1938) was a politician from Guadeloupe who served in the French Chamber of Deputies from 1924 to 1928.

== Bibliography ==
- page on the French National Assembly website
