= Canton of Marie-Galante =

Coordinates: 15.89°N 61.31°W

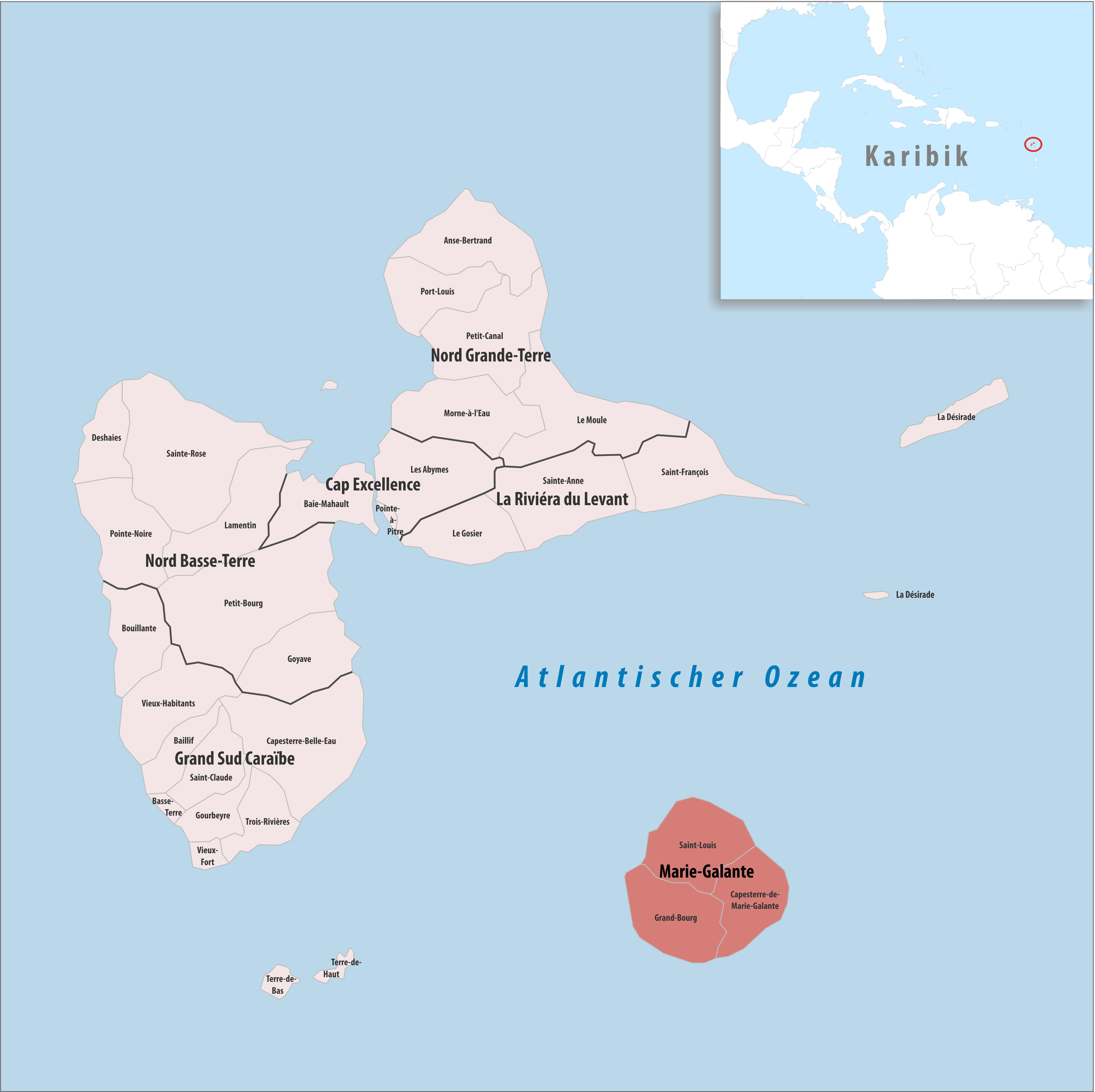
Canton of Marie-Galante

The canton of Marie-Galante is an administrative division of Guadeloupe, an overseas department and region of France. It was created at the French canton reorganisation which came into effect in March 2015. Its seat is in Grand-Bourg.

It consists of the following communes:

1. Capesterre-de-Marie-Galante
2. Grand-Bourg
3. Saint-Louis
