= Communauté de communes de Marie-Galante =

Marie-Galante
- Communauté de communes
- Location of Marie-Galante within the department
- Country: France
- Overseas region and department: Guadeloupe{{{region}}}
- No. of communes: {{{nbcomm}}}
- Established: 1994
- Area: 158.0 km^{2} (61.0 sq mi)
- Population (2019): 10,565
  - Density: 66.87/km^{2} (173.2/sq mi)
- Website: www.paysmariegalante.fr

Communauté de communes de Marie-Galante is a communauté de communes, an intercommunal structure in the Guadeloupe overseas department and region of France. Created in 1994, its seat is in Grand-Bourg. Its area is 158.0 km^{2}. Its population was 10,565 in 2019.

== Composition ==
The communauté d'agglomération consists of the following 3 communes:

1. Grand-Bourg
2. Capesterre-de-Marie-Galante
3. Saint-Louis
