= Saint-Louis, Guadeloupe =

Saint-Louis
- Commune
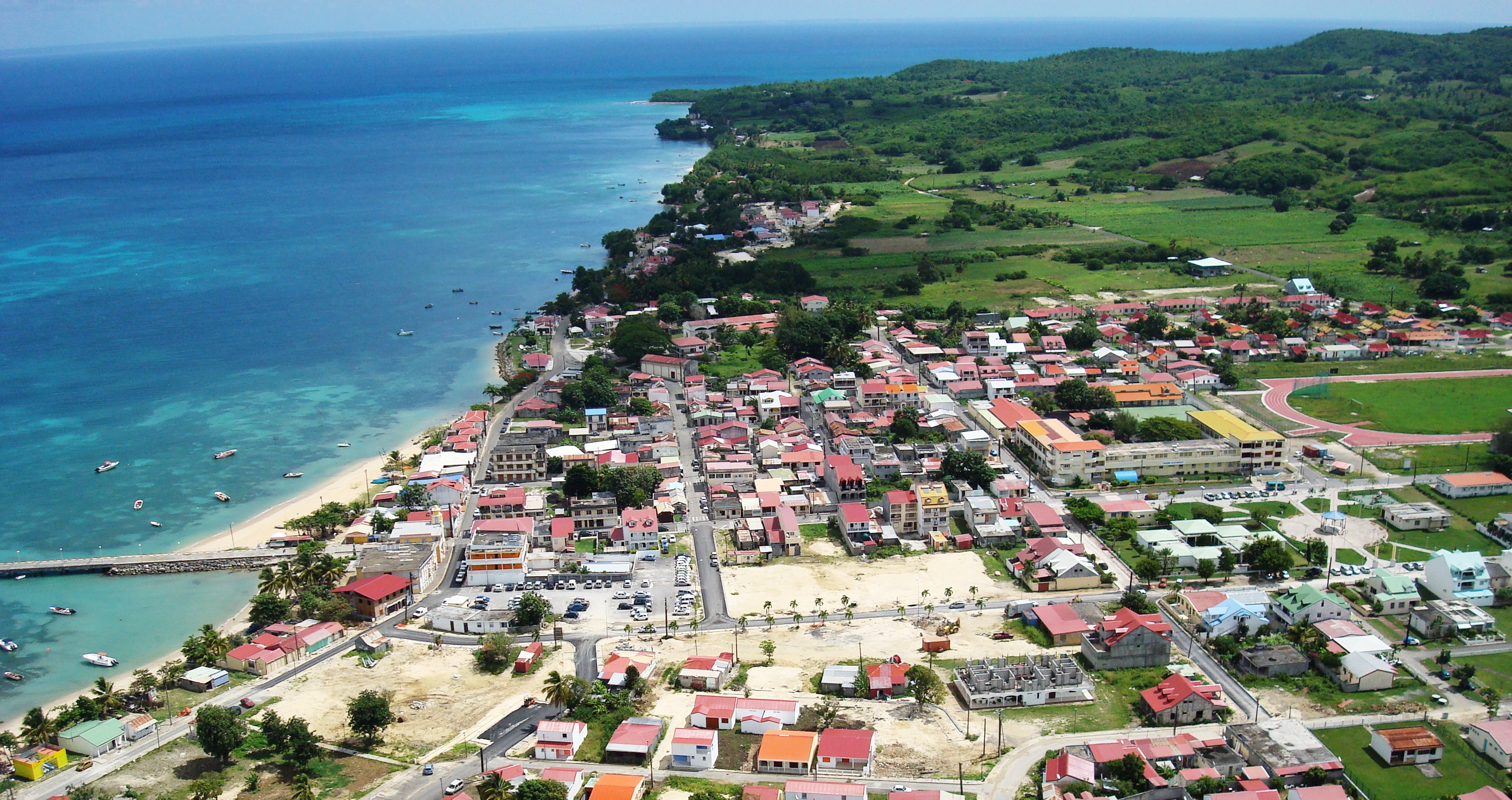
- An aerial view of the commune of Saint-Louis, on Marie-Galante

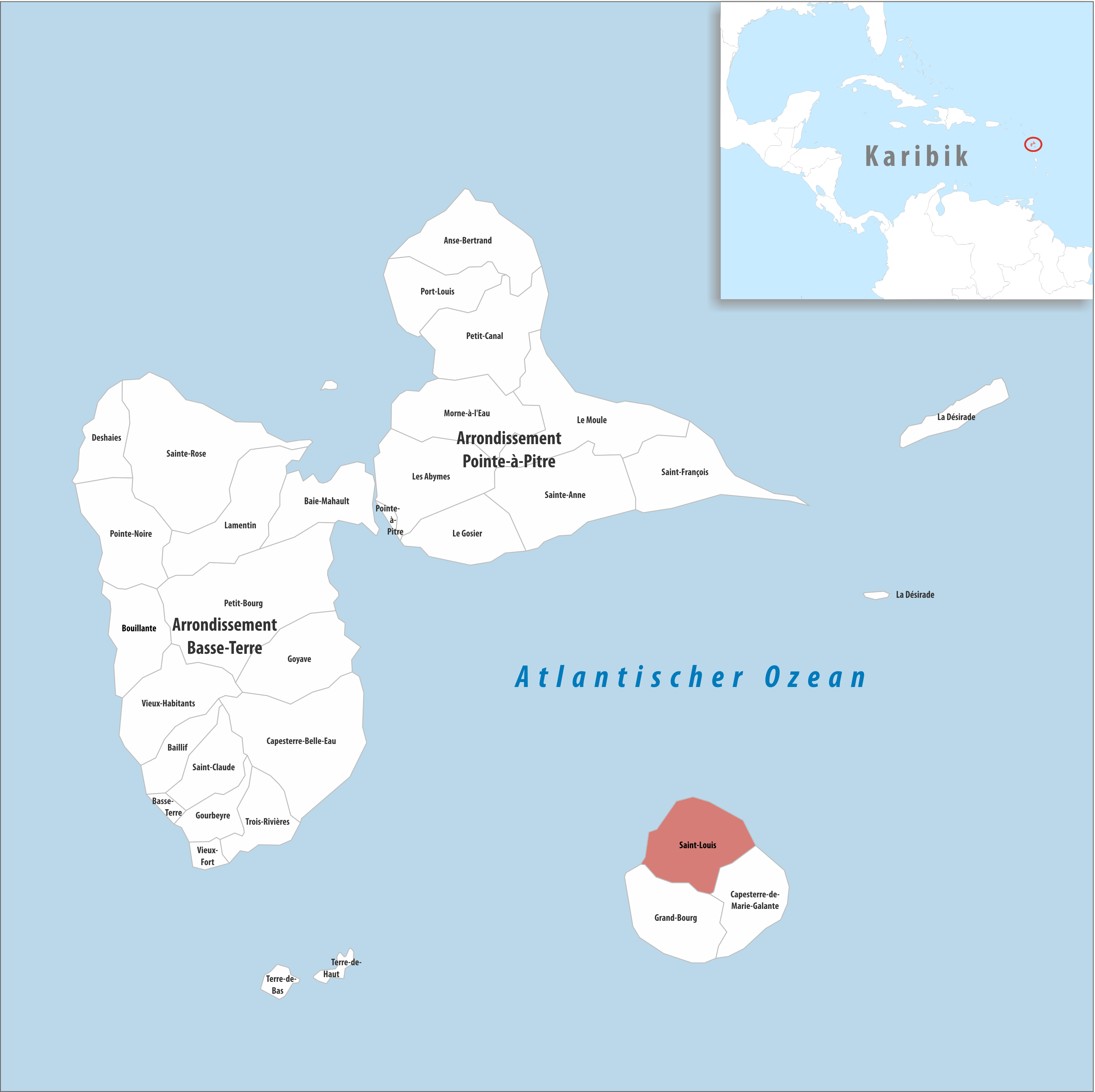
- Location of the commune (in red) within Guadeloupe
- Location of Saint-Louis
- Coordinates: 15°57′00″N 61°19′00″W
- Country: France
- Overseas region and department: Guadeloupe
- Arrondissement: Pointe-à-Pitre
- Canton: Marie-Galante
- Intercommunality: CC Marie-Galante

Government
  - Mayor (2020–2026): François Navis
- Area^{1}: 56.28 km^{2} (21.73 sq mi)
- Population (2023): 2,610
  - Density: 46.4/km^{2} (120/sq mi)
- Time zone: UTC−04:00 (AST)
- INSEE/Postal code: 97126 /97134
- ^{1} French Land Register data, which excludes lakes, ponds, glaciers > 1 km^{2} (0.386 sq mi or 247 acres) and river estuaries.

Saint Louis Lighthouse
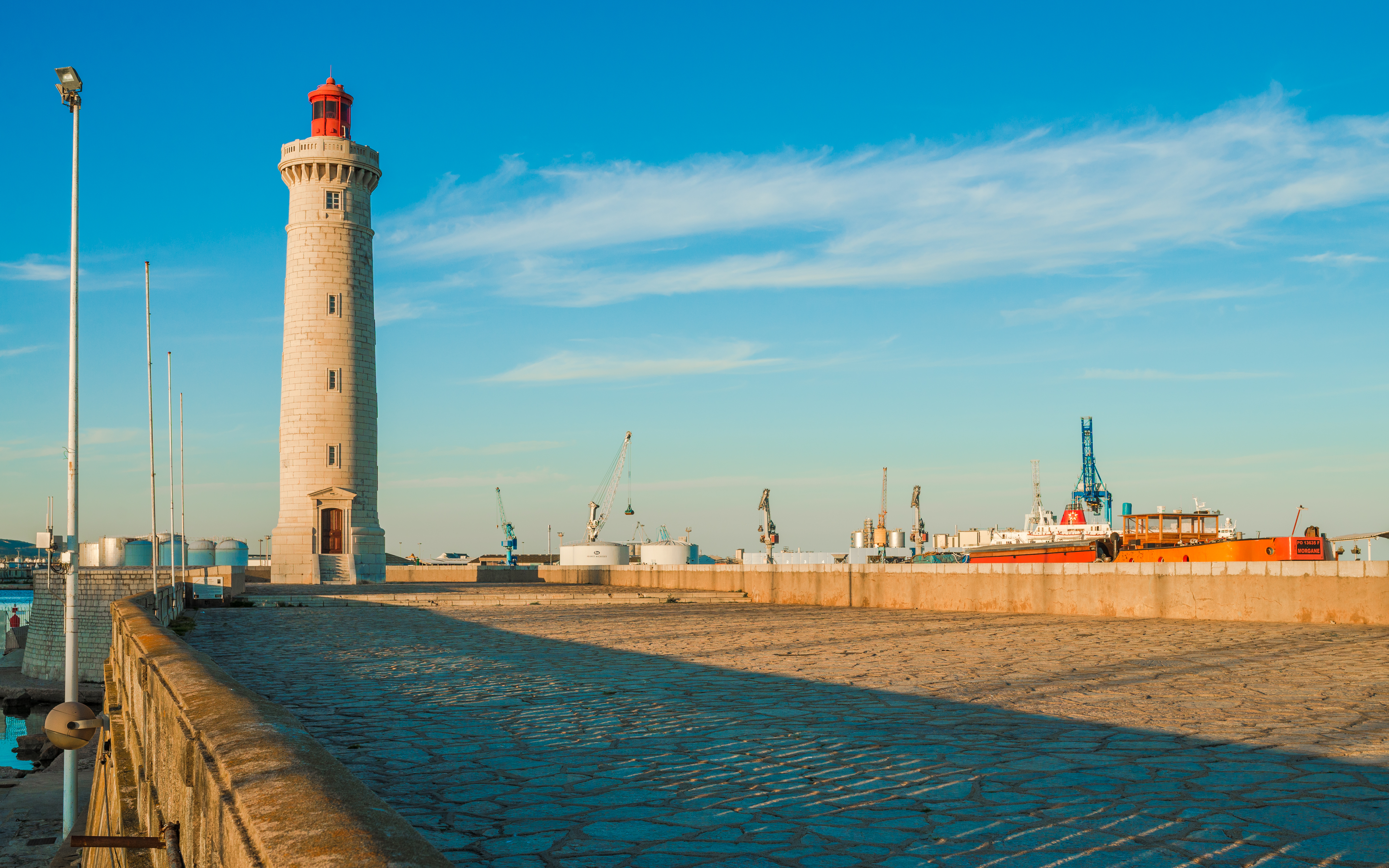
- Location: Saint-Louis, Guadeloupe, France
- Coordinates: 15°57′25″N 61°19′08″W

Tower
- Constructed: 1930 (first)
- Construction: masonry tower
- Height: 9 m (30 ft)
- Shape: quadrangular tower with balcony and light
- Markings: white tower
- Power source: mains electricity

Light
- Focal height: 11 m (36 ft)
- Range: 11 nmi (20 km; 13 mi)
- Characteristic: Fl G 4s

Saint-Louis (French pronunciation: [sɛ̃ lwi]; Guadeloupean Creole: Senlwi) is a commune in the overseas department of Guadeloupe. Saint-Louis lies on the north of the island of Marie-Galante, and is the island's largest commune. Many beaches lie on the west coast of the commune.

== Population ==
Historical population
Year	Pop.	±% p.a.
1967	4,299	—
1974	4,155	−0.49%
1982	3,624	−1.69%
1990	3,404	−0.78%
1999	2,995	−1.41%
2007	2,810	−0.79%
2012	2,535	−2.04%
2017	2,447	−0.70%
2023	2,610	+1.08%
Source: INSEE

== Education ==
Public preschools and primary schools include:

- Ecole primaire Léopold Lubino
- Ecole maternelle Guy Dramort

Public junior high schools include:

- Collège Albert Baclet

== See also ==
- Communes of the Guadeloupe department
- List of lighthouses in Guadeloupe

== Gallery ==
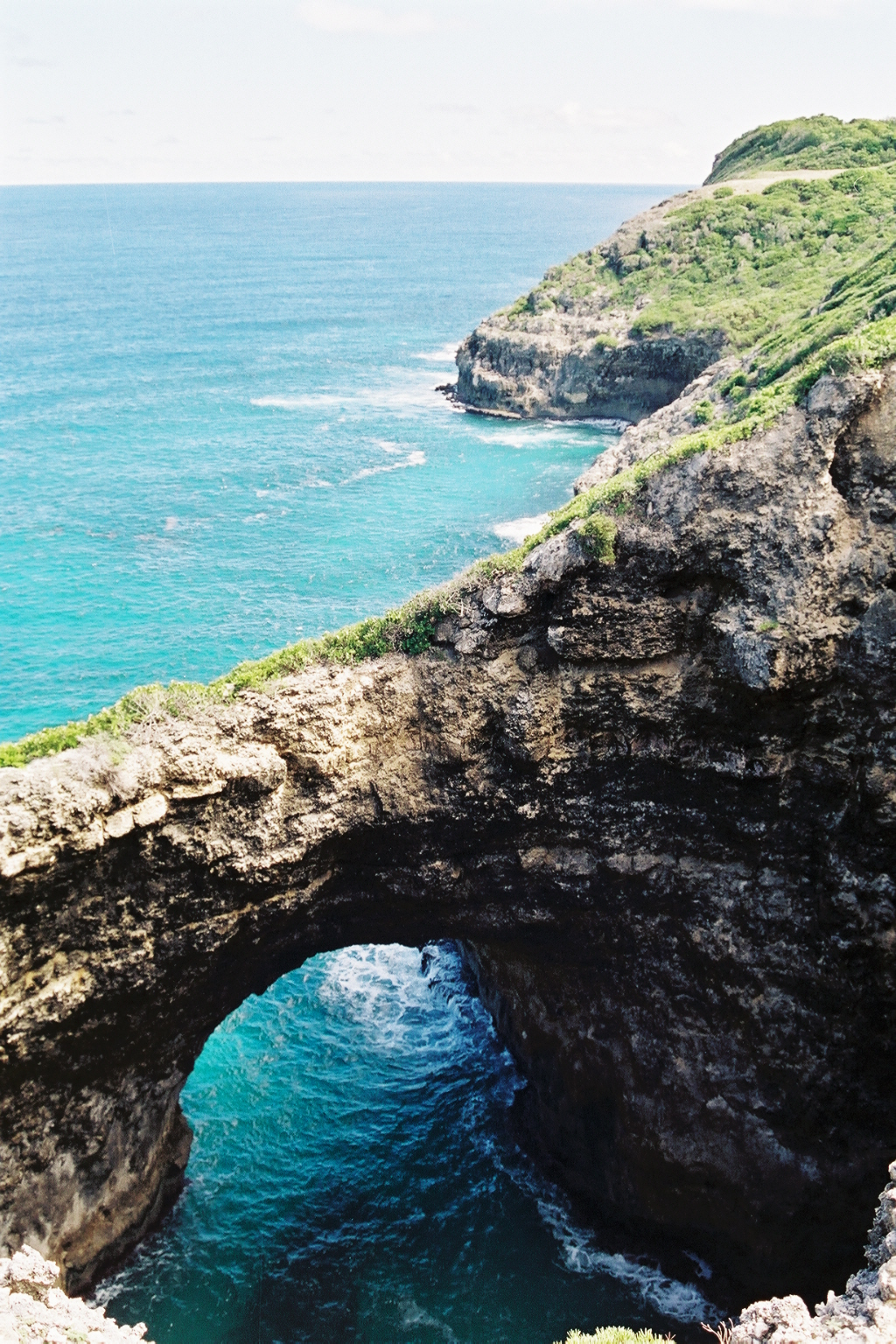
Gueule Grand-Gouffre
