= Capesterre-de-Marie-Galante =

- Commune
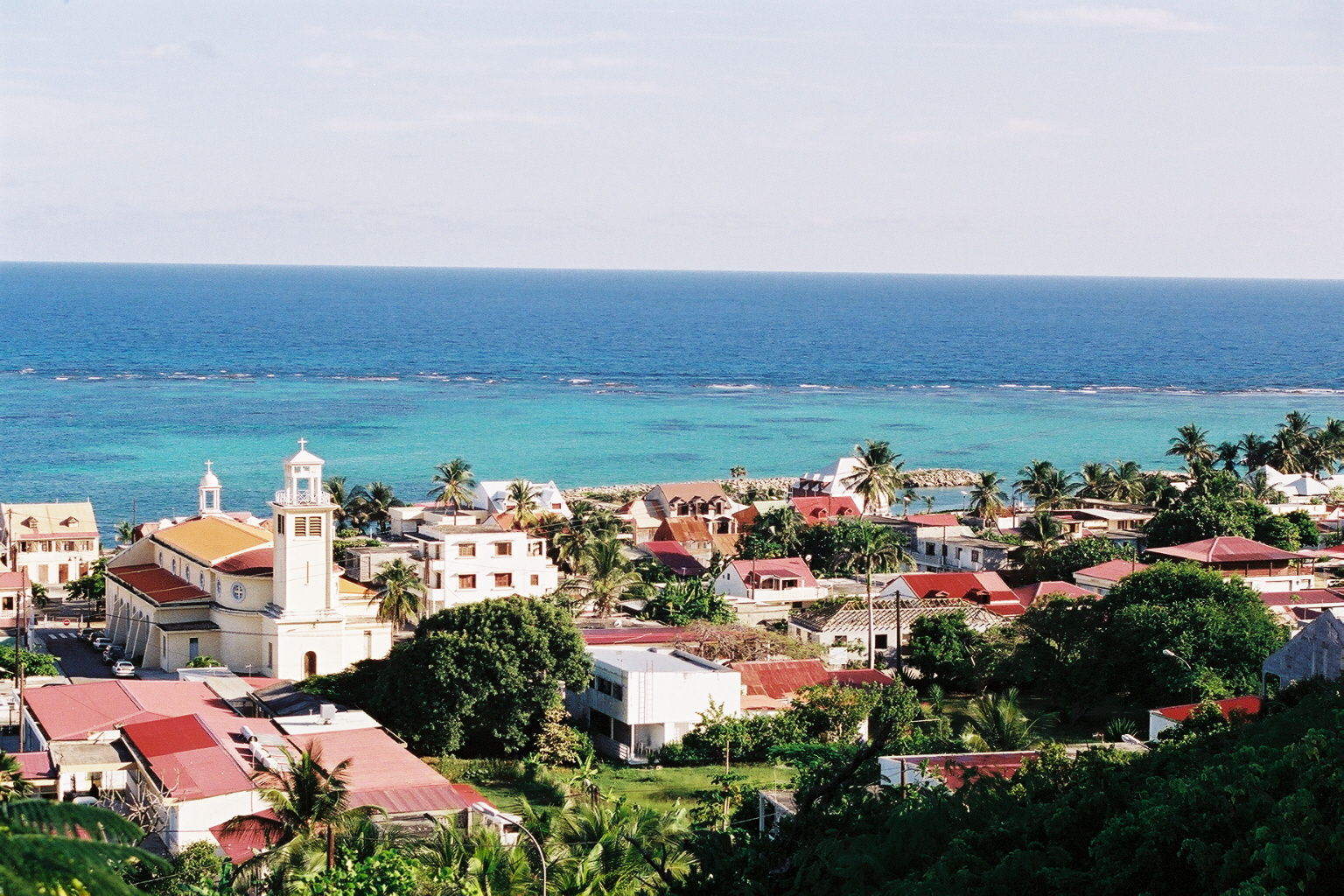
- The town of Capesterre-de-Marie-Galante

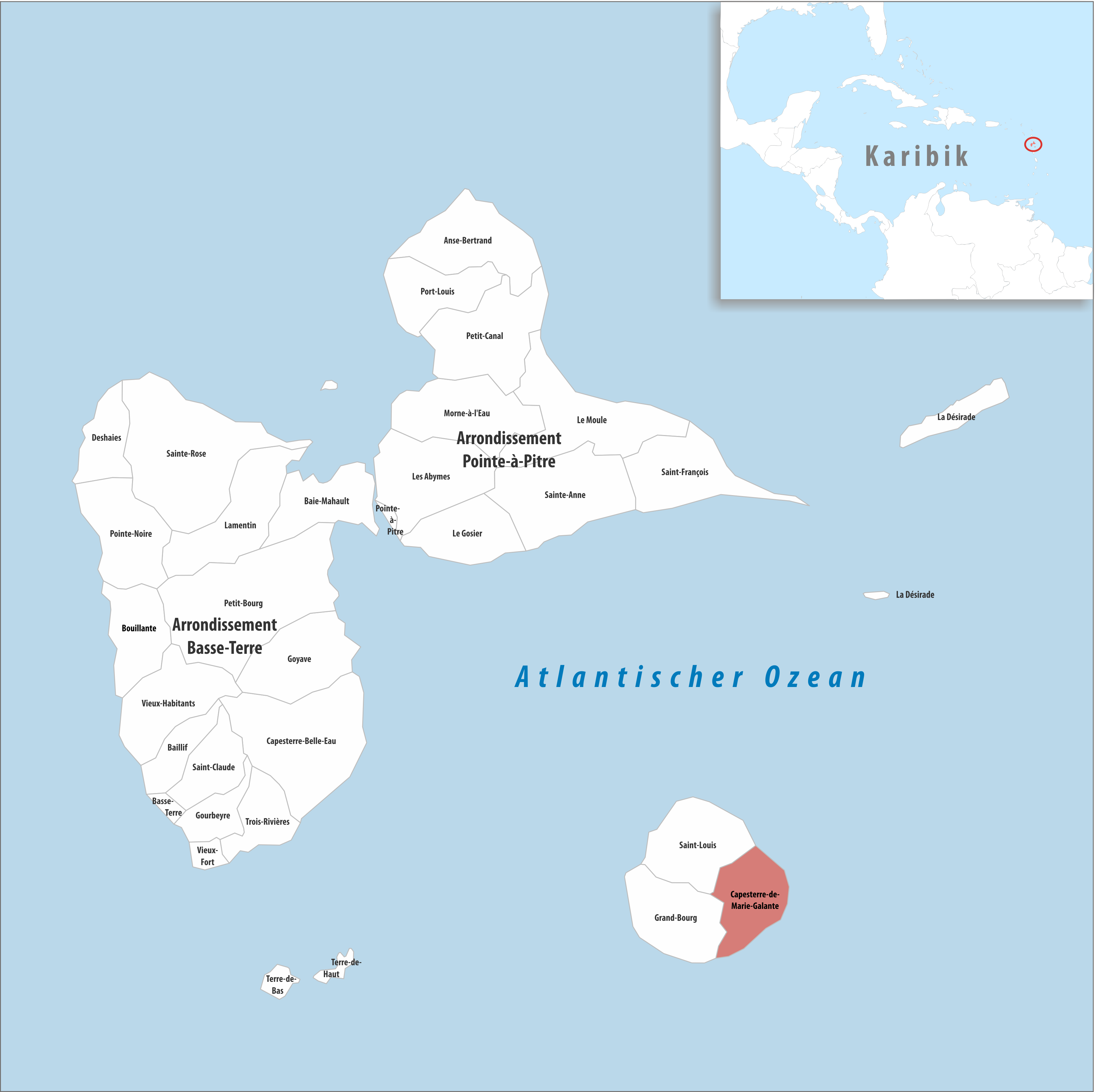
- Location of the commune (in red) within Guadeloupe
- Location of Capesterre-de-Marie-Galante
- Location within France
- Coordinates: 15°54′N 61°13′W
- Country: France
- Overseas region and department: Guadeloupe
- Arrondissement: Pointe-à-Pitre
- Canton: Marie-Galante
- Intercommunality: CC Marie-Galante

Government
  - Mayor (2022–2026): Jean-Claude Maës
- Area^{1}: 46.19 km^{2} (17.83 sq mi)
- Population (2023): 3,123
  - Density: 67.61/km^{2} (175.1/sq mi)
- Time zone: UTC−04:00 (AST)
- INSEE/Postal code: 97108 /97140
- ^{1} French Land Register data, which excludes lakes, ponds, glaciers > 1 km^{2} (0.386 sq mi or 247 acres) and river estuaries.

Capesterre-de-Marie-Galante (French pronunciation: [kapɛstɛʁ də maʁi ɡalɑ̃t], literally Capesterre of Marie-Galante; Guadeloupean Creole: Kapestè Marigalant; often simply referred to as Capesterre) is a commune on the island of Marie-Galante, in the French overseas region and department of Guadeloupe, itself in the Lesser Antilles.

Capesterre-de-Marie-Galante is located on the southeast coast of Marie-Galante. The surface area is 46.19 km^{2} (17.83 sq mi) and the population is 3,123 (as of 2023). The population density is 68 persons per km^{2}.

== History ==
The name of the commune comes from cabesterre, a word in-use until the 17th century, which indicated a "ground [or land] exposed to the east winds".

In 1928, a devastating hurricane made landfall and the borough had to be completely reconstructed.

== Geography ==
Capesterre is situated southeast on the island of Marie-Galante. The port of Capesterre and its long beaches are protected from the waves of the Atlantic by the coral reefs.

=== Climate ===
Like any other Eastern Caribbean town, Capesterre experiences quite evenly spread rainfall during the year, with a wetter season between July and November which coincides with hurricane season. The town receives 1500–2500 mm of rainfall. Tropical heat is the norm, bringing constant highs of around 32 °C (89 °F) that drop to 20 °C (68 °F) at night.

Trade winds, called alizés, blow from the northeast and often temper the climate.

== Population ==
Historical population
Year	Pop.	±% p.a.
1967	5,039	—
1974	5,146	+0.30%
1982	3,983	−3.15%
1990	3,825	−0.50%
1999	3,559	−0.80%
2007	3,455	−0.37%
2012	3,330	−0.73%
2017	3,301	−0.17%
2023	3,123	−0.92%
Source: INSEE

== Economy ==
Capesterre is partly surrounded by forest and scrubland. North, there are sugar fields where sugar is produced. Other food crops such as bananas, cocoa and coffee are also grown. Fishing is also done at the harbor.

There are also manufacturing factories near Capesterre. There is one rum distillery at Capesterre, Bellevue Distillery and it produces Rum Domaine de Bellevue. Also, there is a factory where the production of Moysan Cane syrup. This is a traditional and typical Marie-Galantine product. It is the by-product from the cooked juices of the canes.

Tourism is not a full-scale industry. Capesterre has two hotels nearby and several restaurants. The beaches attract tourists to Marie-Galante.

== Education ==
Public preschools and primary schools include:

- Ecole primaire André Pasbeau
- Ecole primaire A.Diallo Boecasse
- Ecole maternelle les Coccinelles

Public junior high schools include:

- Collége Nelson Mandela

== Sights ==
Capesterre is especially famous for its beaches and relaxing, leisurely activities, such as the beaches of Feuillère and Petite Anse.

The Bézard Windmill was the first windmill in the French West Indies to have been reconstructed to its original state, and returned to proper, working condition. It is one of the only mills on Marie-Galante to have benefited from technological advancements in sugar cane milling at the end of the 19th century. Its structure is completely metal, with horizontal rollers for improved efficiency.

The wind turbine at Petite Place was put into operation in 1998. It produces electricity that is directly-deposited into the reserves of EDF (French Electrics). Thanks to the tradewinds, some 30% of the island's electricity is naturally produced.

The church of the Holy-Anne is located near the bay.

== Photo gallery ==
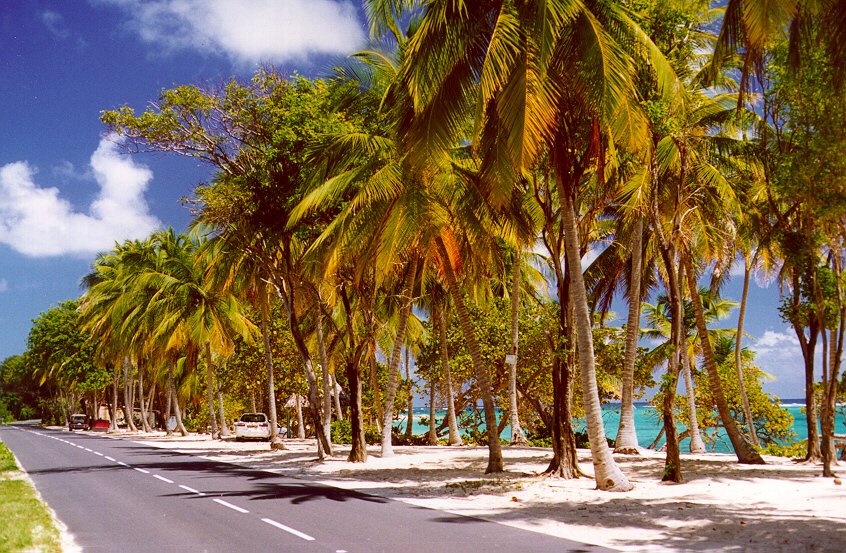
Road by the ocean near Capesterre-de-Marie-Galante

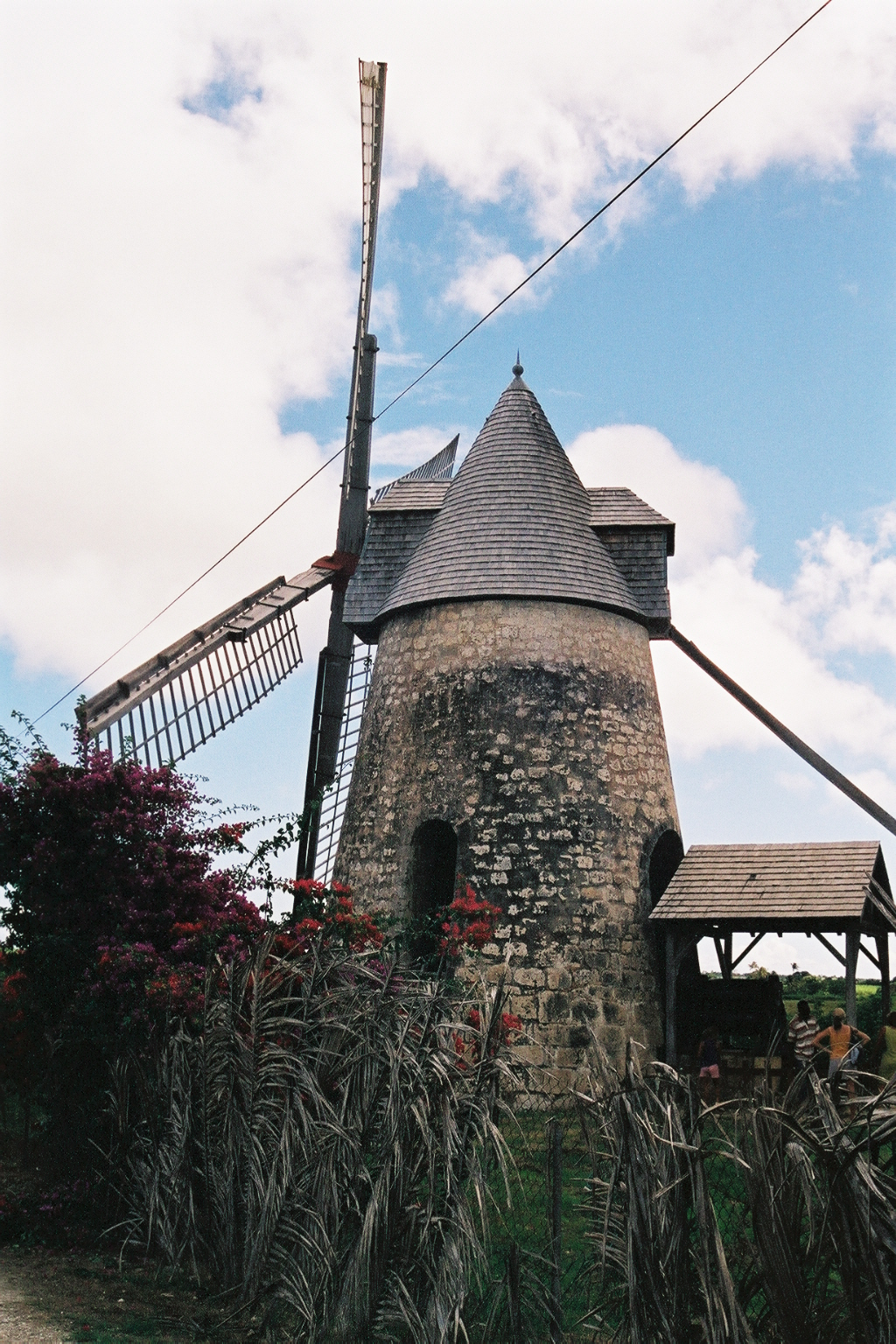
The Bézard Windmill, northwest of Capesterre

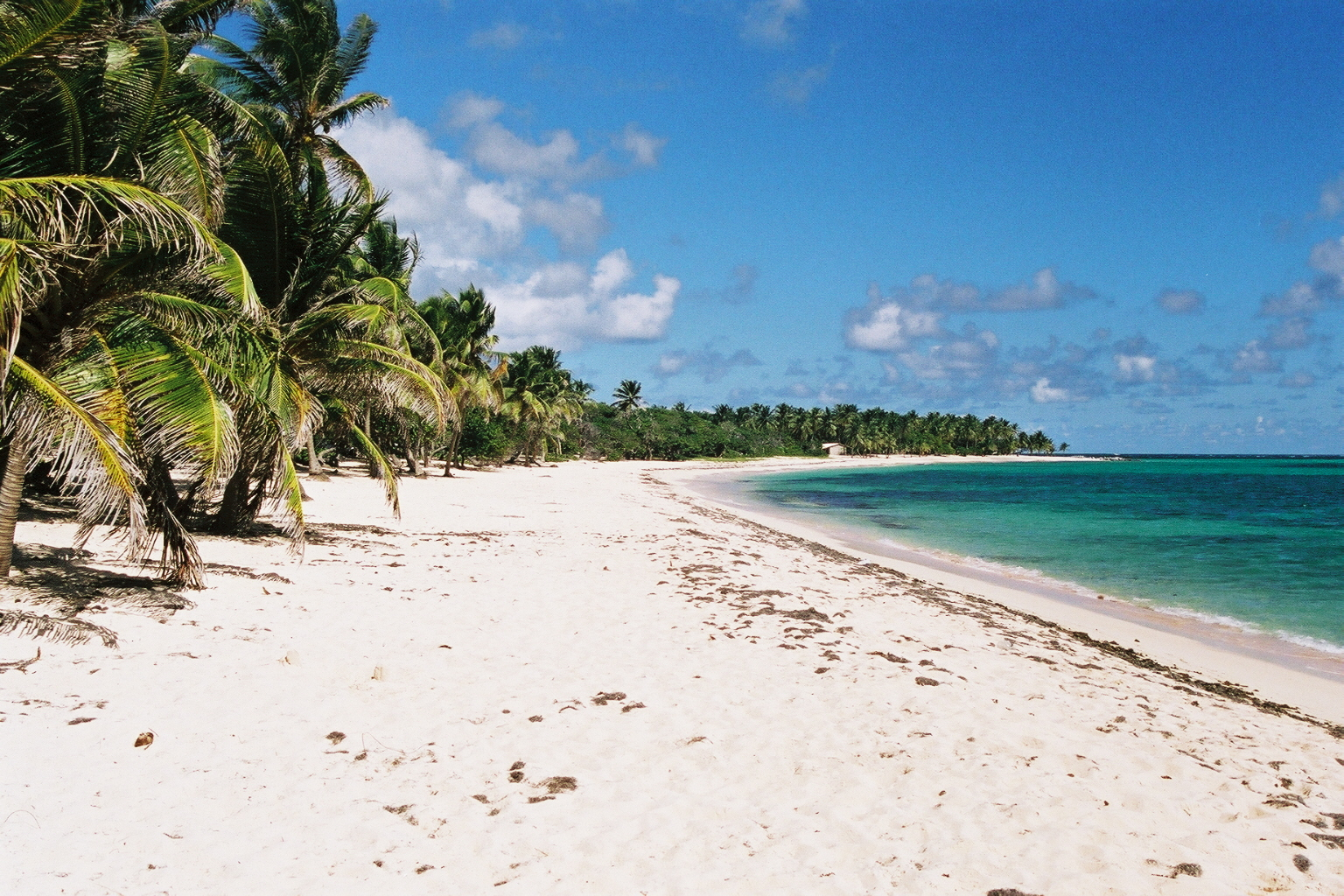
Beach of Feuillère

== See also ==
- Communes of the Guadeloupe department
