= Grand-Bourg =

- Commune
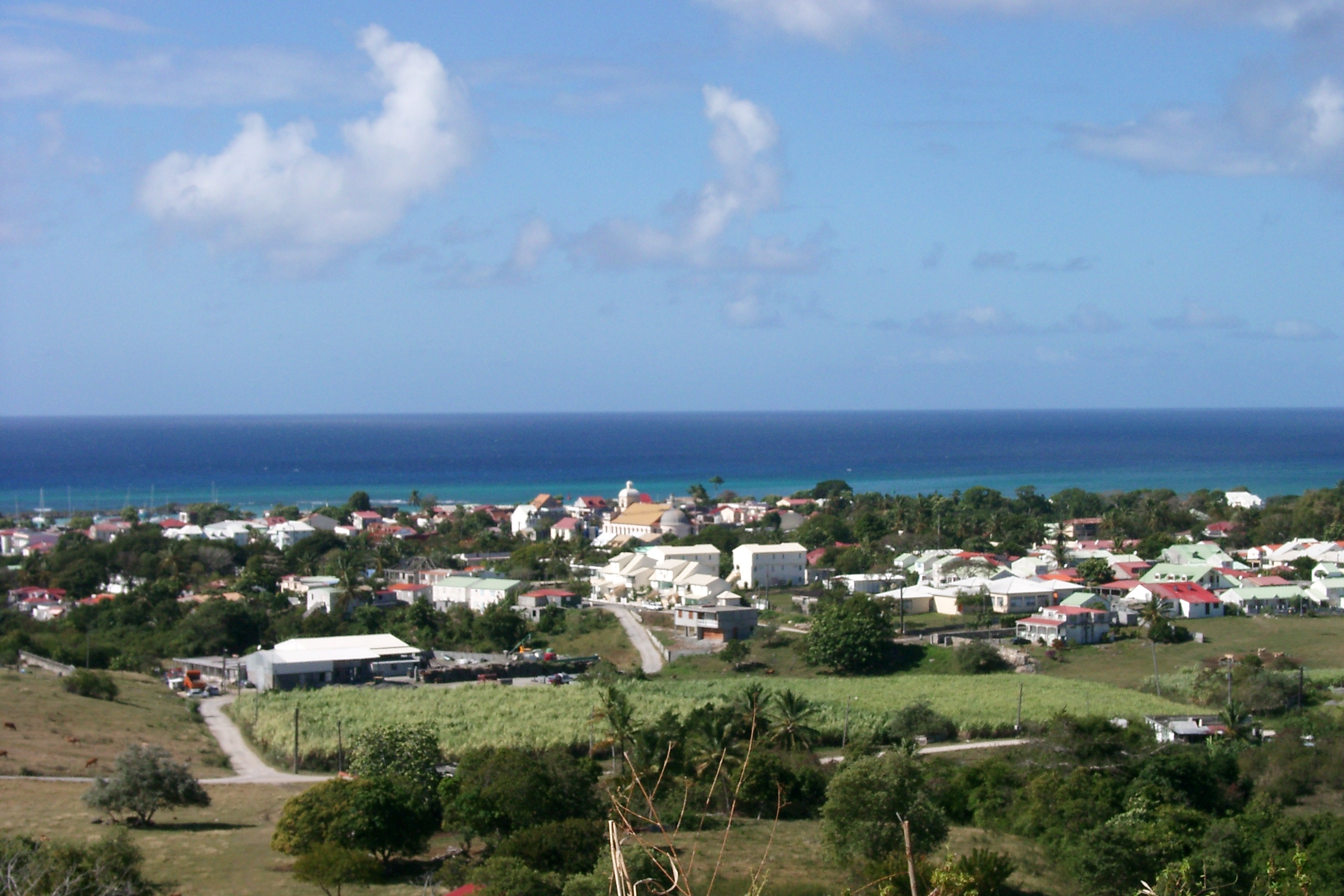
- A view of Grand-Bourg, on Marie-Galante

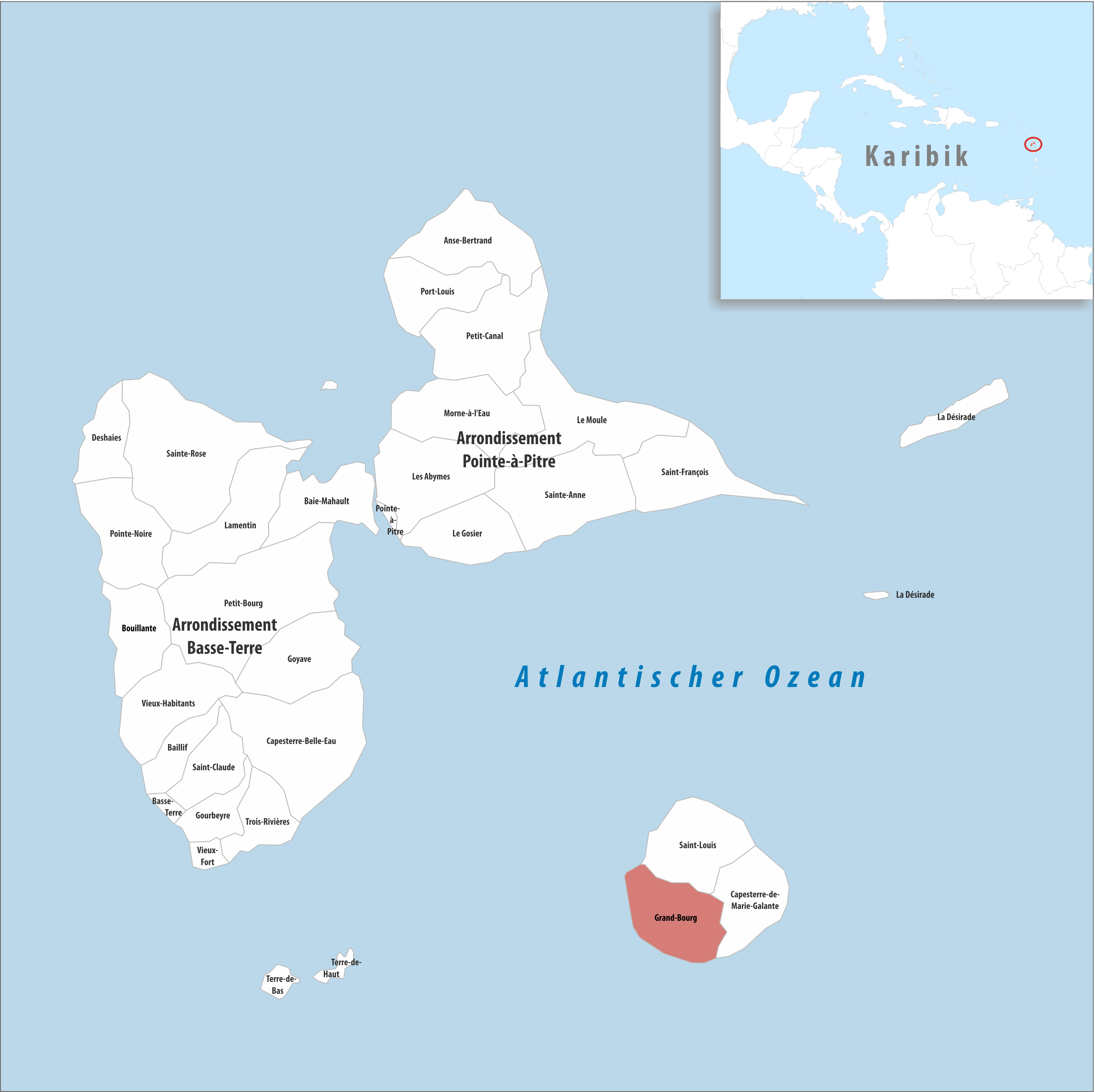
- Location of the commune (in red) within Guadeloupe
- Location of Grand-Bourg
- Coordinates: 15°53′N 61°19′W
- Country: France
- Overseas region and department: Guadeloupe
- Arrondissement: Pointe-à-Pitre
- Canton: Marie-Galante
- Intercommunality: CC Marie-Galante

Government
  - Mayor (2020–2026): Maryse Etzol
- Area^{1}: 55.54 km^{2} (21.44 sq mi)
- Population (2023): 4,617
  - Density: 83.13/km^{2} (215.3/sq mi)
- Time zone: UTC−04:00 (AST)
- INSEE/Postal code: 97112 /97112
- ^{1} French Land Register data, which excludes lakes, ponds, glaciers > 1 km^{2} (0.386 sq mi or 247 acres) and river estuaries.

Grand-Bourg, also known as Grand-Bourg de Marie-Galante (French pronunciation: [ɡʁɑ̃ buʁ də maʁi ɡalɑ̃t], Antillean Creole: Gwanbou Mawigalant or Granbou Marigalant), is a commune on the island of Marie-Galante, in the French overseas region and department of Guadeloupe, in the Lesser Antilles, Caribbean. It is located in the southwest of Marie-Galante, and is the most populous of the three communes on the island.

Grand-Bourg hosts the headquarters of the communal association of Marie-Galante. The Marie-Galante Airfield is located in Grand-Bourg.

== History ==
The Marais Folle Anse, a vast fresh water reserve, allowed habitation by native Arawaks at the beginning of the 1st millennium. It is possible that Christopher Columbus visited in 1493 during his second voyage. In 1653, a fort was established by French colonists.

== Geography ==
Grand-Bourg is located at the south-west of the island of Marie-Galante and is the location of the chief town. The co-ordinates are 15° 53'N and 61° 19'W.

The major part of the commune consists of an undulating plateau. It is dominated by a broad littoral plain and mangrove forest in the north, with broad beaches in most coastal areas. In the south, the coast is protected by a coral reef. The northern limit of the commune follows the Saint-Louis river.

=== Climate ===
Grand-Bourg experiences rainfall evenly spread during the year, which is typical of Caribbean islands, with a wetter season between July and November which coincides with hurricane season. The town receives 1,500 to 2,500 mm (59 to 98 in) of rainfall per year. Tropical heat is the norm, bringing constant highs of around 32 °C (90 °F) that drop to 20 °C (68 °F) at night.

Trade winds, called alizés, blow from the northeast and often temper the climate.

== Population ==
Historical population
Year	Pop.	±% p.a.
1967	6,529	—
1974	6,611	+0.18%
1982	6,150	−0.90%
1990	6,244	+0.19%
1999	5,934	−0.56%
2007	5,674	−0.56%
2012	5,423	−0.90%
2017	5,012	−1.56%
2023	4,617	−1.36%
Source: INSEE

== Economy ==
Grand-Bourg is responsible for a significant part of the economic, commercial and administrative activity of the island. Its port is the most important on the island. Fishing and tourism are important parts of the economy. An airport ensures a connection with Guadeloupe in 15 minutes.

Sugar cane fields grow abundantly and a sugar factory is located in the north. There are two hotels and one restaurant in Grand-Bourg.

== Personalities ==
- Charles-François Bonneville, born on March 13, 1803, was a mayor and adviser general of Grand-Bourg of 1854 to 1860 and president of the Chamber of Agriculture. He revived of the culture of cotton long silk which he tried out on the Thibault dwelling.
- Armand Jean-François (1874–1938), politician
- Furcie Tirolien (1886–1981), politician

== Education ==
Public preschools and primary schools include:

- École primaire Grand bourg
- École primaire Morne Lolo
- École maternelle Faup
- École maternelle Les Foufous
- École maternelle Vannier

Public junior high schools include:

- Collège Grand-Bourg

Public senior high schools include:

- LPO Hyacinthe Bastaraud

Private primary schools:

- École primaire privée Notre Dame

== Sights ==
The town is picturesque with its 19th-century church and nearby fort. The island's best beach lies adjacent to Grand-Bourg: Plage de la Feuillère, a 2 km (1 1/4-mile) stretch of white sand that is favored by swimmers and sunbathers.

The Murat Plantation, with its 207 slaves, was considered in 1839 to be the largest sugar cane plantation in Guadeloupe. According to the legend, it was Jeanne Laballe, a fine arts student and wife of Dominique Murat, who laid out the château at the beginning of the 19th century. Today, it is an eco-museum of arts and traditions where on several hundred square meters it houses over three centuries of Guadeloupe's sugar refinery history up to the colonial age. The museum hosts a collection of historic documents, a lecture hall, and a garden of medicinal plants.

The Roussel-Trianon Plantation, today owned by the Council General of Guadeloupe, is noted for its stables, which are still in very good condition, and for the smoke stack of the old sugar refinery which figures on the list of historical monuments.

The Bielle distillery produces 120,000 litres (26,396 imperial gallons; 31,701 US gallons) of rum annually. The Poisson Distillery produces nearly 200,000 litres (43,994 imperial gallons; 52,834 US gallons) of its rum each year.

The Punch Pond played a role during dramatic events of 24 and 25 June 1849. A stele in memory of the martyrs of this historical event stands nearby. The family and rural center that adjoins this sight is creating a museum project, "Alonzo", that during the year 2000 will provide a scenography of the said events.

Armand Baptiste Sculpture Gallery has a permanent exhibition of wooden sculptures in many types of wood such as ebony, manchioneel, and campeachy. Au Gres Des Iles Potter's Workshop has an exhibition of pottery artifacts.

== Twin towns – Sister cities ==
Grand-Bourg is twinned with Bagneux, Hauts-de-Seine, France.

== See also ==
- Communes of the Guadeloupe department
