= List of airports in Guadeloupe =

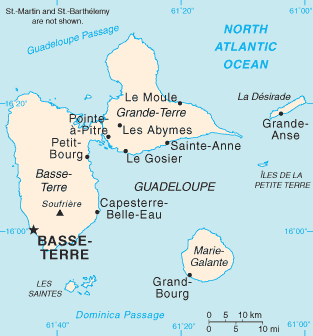
The islands of Guadeloupe.

This is a list of airports in Guadeloupe. Guadeloupe is an archipelago located in the eastern Caribbean. It is an overseas department of France comprising five main islands: Basse-Terre Island, Grande-Terre, La Désirade, Les Saintes and Marie-Galante. CAO location identifiers are linked to each airport's Aeronautical Information Publication (AIP), which are available online in Portable Document Format (PDF) from the French Service d'information aéronautique (SIA).

Commune	Island	ICAO	IATA	Airport name	Usage	Coordinates
Baillif	Basse-Terre	TFFB	BBR	Baillif Airport	Restricted	16°00′38″N 061°44′32″W
Grande-Anse	La Désirade	TFFA	DSD	La Désirade Airport (or Grande-Anse Airport)	Restricted	16°17′49″N 061°05′04″W
Grand-Bourg	Marie-Galante	TFFM	GBJ	Marie-Galante Airport (or Les Bases Airport)	Public	15°52′07″N 061°16′20″W
Pointe-à-Pitre	Grande-Terre	TFFR	PTP	Pointe-à-Pitre Airport (or Le Raizet Airport)	Public	16°15′51″N 061°31′33″W
Saint-François	Grande-Terre	TFFC	SFC	Saint-François Airport	Public	16°15′28″N 061°15′45″W
Terre-de-Haut	Terre-de-Haut (Les Saintes)	TFFS	LSS	Les Saintes Airport (or Terre-de-Haut Airport)	Restricted	15°51′52″N 061°34′50″W

== See also ==
- List of airports by ICAO code: T#Guadeloupe
- Wikipedia: Airline destination lists: North America#Guadeloupe (France)
- Transport in Guadeloupe
- List of airports in France
