= Yadong Luo =

Chinese academic

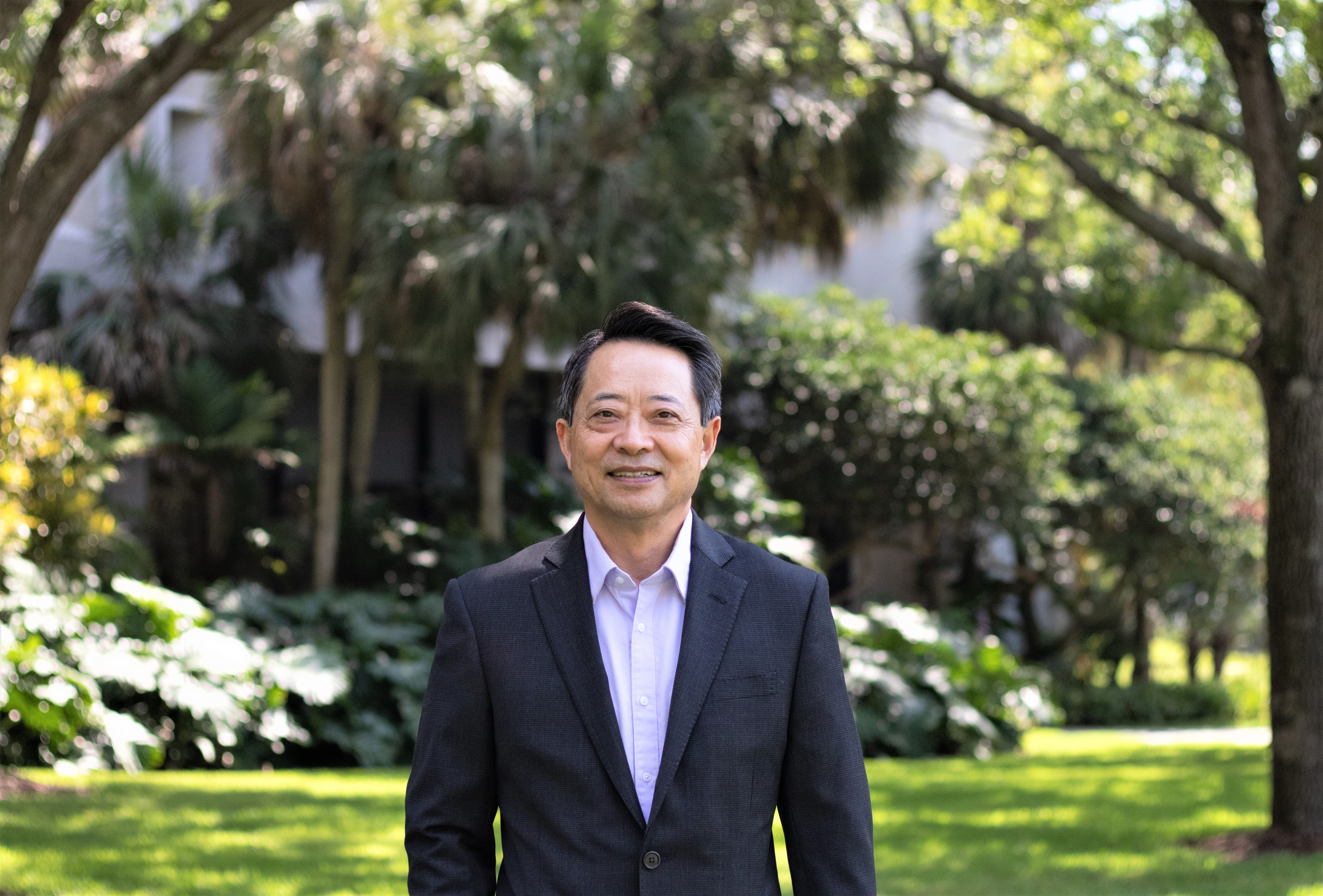
Luo in 2023

Yadong Luo is the Emery M. Findley distinguished chair and professor of management at the University of Miami Herbert Business School in Coral Gables, Florida.

Luo is a fellow of the Academy of Management (AOM) and a fellow of Academy of International Business. He has written over 20 books and over 220 research articles (including over 60 articles in UT-Dallas Top Business Journals List), dealing with topics from global strategy and cooperative alliances to cross-cultural management and emerging market businesses. He has contributed to a long range of business and management issues, including developing such theories as the springboard theory, composition-based view, global co-opetition, and others. He also has written on the development of business and management in emerging markets.

== Biography ==
Luo was born in China. He obtained his MS from the University of International Business and Economics in Beijing in 1988 and his Ph.D. from Temple University in Philadelphia in 1996. He is also an international advisory board member and honorary professor of several business schools and universities in Asia. He has served as senior editor of the Journal of International Business Studies and other journals and had worked for seven years in international business and public policy before joining academia. On Google Scholar, Luo's publications have amassed over 67,000 citations (H Index=122).

== Career ==
Luo was ranked the world's most productive scholar in international business (1995-2011) by Management International Review in 2014, most prolific author in leading international business journals by International Business Review in 2010, most productive researcher in international strategic management research (2000-2013) by Management International Review in 2016, and most prolific author on Asian management by Journal of Management Studies in 2008 and on Chinese management (2000-2006) by Asia Pacific Journal of Management in 2007. He is ranked #12 worldwide in the field of Business & Management by Stanford U. World’s Top Scientists List.

In 2016, Luo was ranked second worldwide in management and sixth worldwide among all business school faculty concerning journal and research contributions. He received the Faculty Senate Distinguished Scholar Award in 2009 and the Lifetime Achievement Award in 2023 at the University of Miami, the university's highest recognition awarded to its faculty. He was also the recipient of Academy of Management Best Educator Award (IM Division) and Academy of Management Hyundai Motor Eminent Scholar Award. His recent book, "The Digital Multinationals (with S. Nambisan, MIT Press, 2022) was awarded the Axiom Gold Metal (in the International Business/Globalization category).

== Books ==
- International Business (2003, 2008, 2014, 2021) (with Shenkar)
- The Digital Multinationals (2022, MIT Press) (with Nambisan)
- Guanxi and Business (2000, 2007, 2020)
- Global Dimensions of Corporate Governance (2006)
- Co-opetition in International Business (2004)
- Managing Human Resources in Cross-Border Alliances (2003) (with Schuler and Jackson)
- Multinational Enterprises in Emerging Markets (2002)
- China's Service Sector: A New Battlefield for International Corporations (2001)
- Strategy, Structure, and Performance of MNCs in China (2001)
- International Joint Ventures: Theory and Practice (2001) (with Yan)
- How to Enter China: Choices and Lessons (2000)
- MNCs in China: Benefiting from Structural Transformation (2000)
- Entry and Cooperative Strategies in International Business Expansion (1999)
