= Niosi =

Niosi is a surname. Notable people with the surname include:

- Bert Niosi (1909–1987), Canadian bandleader
- Chris Niosi (born 1988), known as Kirbopher, American voice actor, animator, and producer
- Jorge Niosi (1945–2023), Argentine-born Canadian academic and professor
