= Les Saintes Airport =

Les Saintes Airport Aérodrome de Terre-de-Haut
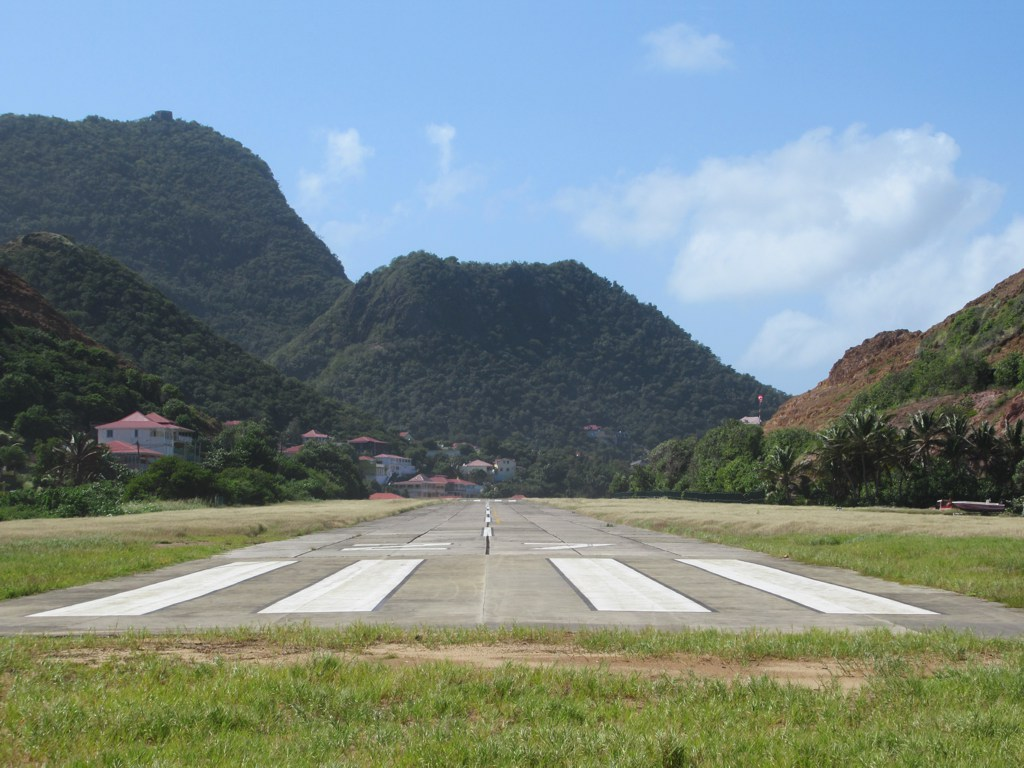
- IATA: LSS; ICAO: TFFS

Summary
- Airport type: Public
- Operator: Conseil Général de la Guadeloupe
- Serves: Terre-de-Haut, Îles des Saintes
- Elevation AMSL: 42 ft / 13 m
- Coordinates: 15°51′52″N 061°34′50″W

Map
- Location in Guadeloupe

Runways
Direction	Length		Surface
Direction	m	ft	Surface
09/27	544	1,785	Concrete
- Sources: AIP, GCM Google Maps

Les Saintes Airport (IATA: LSS, ICAO: TFFS) is an airport serving the archipelago of Îles des Saintes, French West Indies. It is on an isthmus in the middle of Terre-de-Haut Island, a dependency of Guadeloupe.

A special pilot license endorsement is required to land here.

== See also ==
- Transport in Guadeloupe
- List of airports in Guadeloupe
