= Baillif Airport =

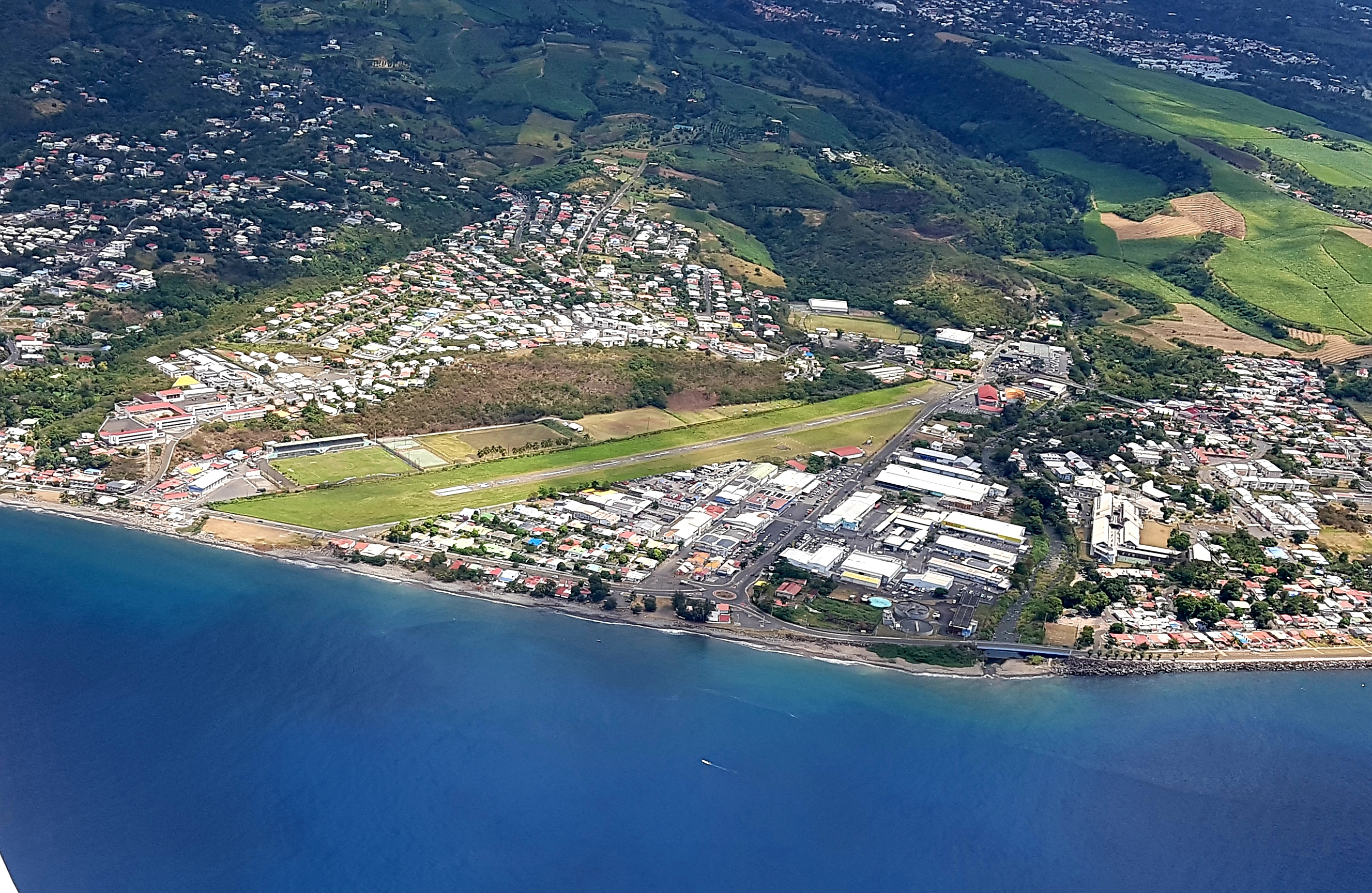
- IATA: BBR; ICAO: TFFB

Summary
- Airport type: Public
- Serves: Basse Terre
- Elevation AMSL: 64 ft / 20 m
- Coordinates: 16°00′50″N 61°44′35″W

Map
- Location of the airport in Guadeloupe

Runways
Direction	Length		Surface
Direction	m	ft	Surface
14/32	620	2,034	Asphalt
- Sources: GCM Google Maps

Baillif Airport (IATA: BBR, ICAO: TFFB) is an airport serving Basse Terre, a coastal city in Guadeloupe. The airport has high terrain north through southeast.

== See also ==
- Transport in Guadeloupe
- List of airports in Guadeloupe
