= La Désirade Airport =

Airport in Guadeloupe, France

La Désirade Airport Grande Anse Airport
- IATA: DSD; ICAO: TFFA

Summary
- Airport type: Public
- Serves: La Désirade
- Elevation AMSL: 10 ft / 3 m
- Coordinates: 16°17′50″N 61°05′00″W

Map
- Location of the airport in Guadeloupe

Runways
Direction	Length		Surface
Direction	m	ft	Surface
09/27	605	1,985	Asphalt
- Sources: GCM Google Maps

La Désirade Airport (IATA: DSD, ICAO: TFFA) is an airport serving La Désirade, the easternmost island of Guadeloupe.

The airport is on the south shore, with water off both ends, and high terrain to the northeast.

== See also ==
- Transport in Guadeloupe
- List of airports in Guadeloupe
