= Saint-François Airport =

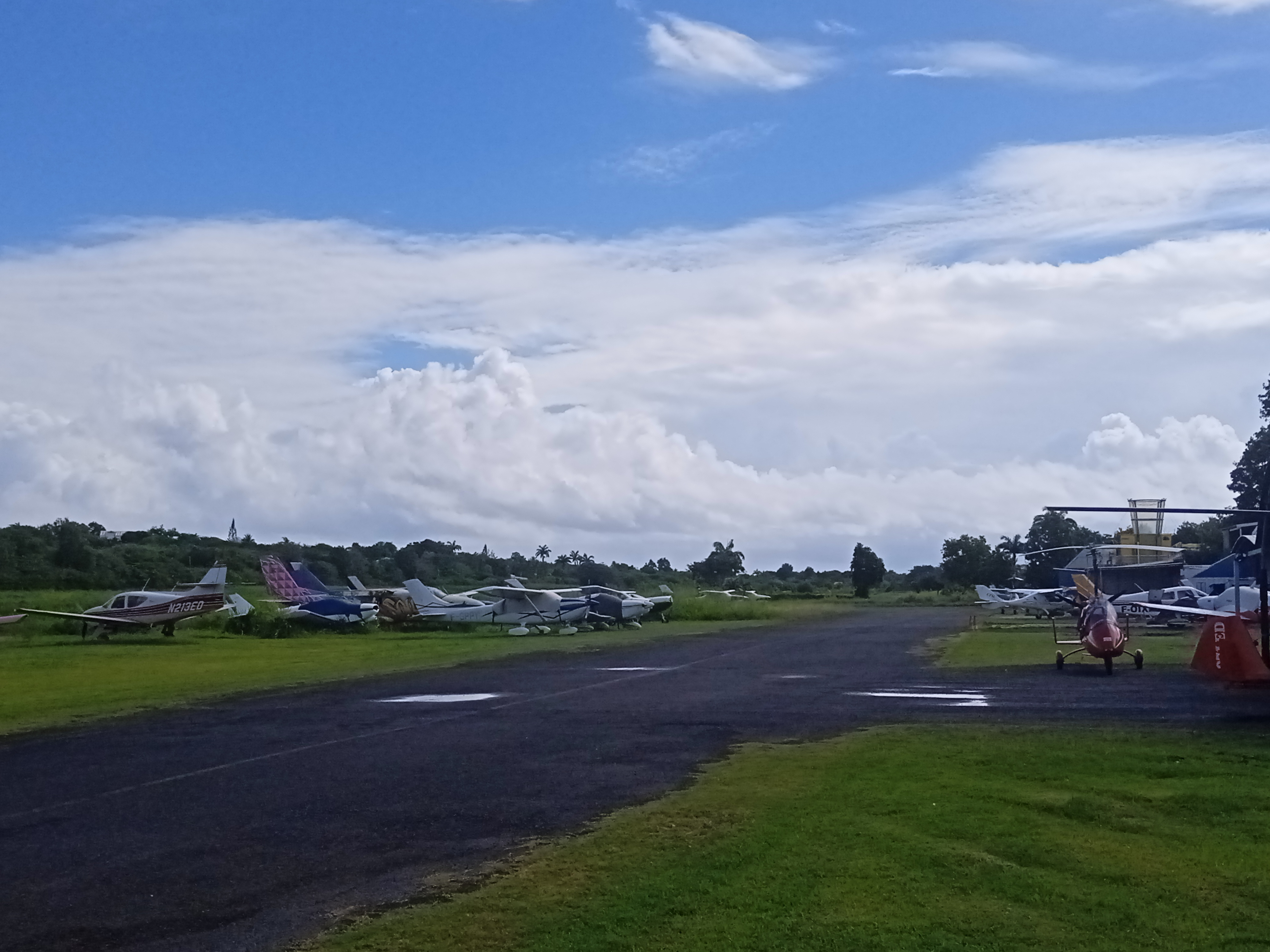
- IATA: SFC; ICAO: TFFC

Summary
- Airport type: Public
- Serves: Saint-François
- Elevation AMSL: 10 ft / 3 m
- Coordinates: 16°15′28″N 61°15′45″W

Map
- Location of the airport in Guadeloupe

Runways
| Direction | Length | | Surface |
| Direction | m | ft | Surface |
|---|---|---|---|
| 11/29 | 600 | 1,969 | Asphalt |
- Sources: GCM Google Maps

Saint-François Airport (IATA: SFC, ICAO: TFFC) is an airport serving Saint-François, a town at the southeastern tip of Grande Terre island in Guadeloupe.

== See also ==
- Transport in Guadeloupe
- List of airports in Guadeloupe
