= GBJ =

GBJ may refer to:

- Jersey, a British Crown Dependency (licence plate code)
- Marie-Galante Airport, Guadeloupe (IATA code)
- Gutob language (ISO 639-3 code)
