= Jorge Niosi =

Canadian academic (1945–2023)

Jorge Niosi FRSC (1945 – 8 May 2023) was an Argentine-born Canadian academic who was a professor at the Université du Québec à Montréal from 1970. He became a Full Professor in 1984, and a member of the Department of Management and Technology at the School of Management Science, UQAM. From 2001 to 2015, he was the Chairholder of Canada Research Chair on the Management of Technology and Technology Policy. He was the founder of CREDIT (Center for Research on Industrial and Technological Development), of which he was the director from 1986 to 1993. Right after that, he became director of CIRST (Centre for Inter-University Research on Science and technology) of which he was a regular member. He held a 3rd cycle degree in economics from the Institut d’études du développement économique et social (IEDES, Paris, 1970), and a doctoral 3rd cycle degree in sociology from the École pratique des hautes études (EPHE, Paris, 1973). His doctoral thesis was published in 1974 (Los empresarios y el Estado argentino, Siglo XXI, 1974), then translated in French as Les entrepreneurs dans la politique Argentine (Montreal, PUQ, 1976). That first book was followed by 14 others, some of which were also translated, the latest being Building National and Regional Innovation Systems (Cheltenham, Elgar, UK, 2010). His latest book published in Spanish in Buenos Aires is called: Construir la Nueva Economía Argentina (Autores de Argentina, Buenos Aires, 2017).

Niosi was also the author or coauthor of some 65 articles in refereed journals such as the Cambridge Journal of Economics, Research Policy, World Development, Journal of Business Research, Industrial and Corporate Change, R&D Management, Management International Review, Small Business Economics, Technology in Society, Technovation, Journal of Technology Transfer, Journal of Evolutionary Economics and Revue d’économie industrielle. He is also the author of some 45 chapters in books. His work has received over 1200 citations in Scopus and around 4900 in Scholar.

Niosi presented over 80 communications in pair-reviewed congresses, trained close to 10 post-doctoral fellows, and over 20 PhD students. He had been an invited professor in different universities, mostly in France but also in Finland and Italy, and had been a member of numerous committees including the Advisory Committee on Science and Technology Statistics, at Statistics Canada, and a similar committee at Institut de la Statistique du Québec. He was a member of the Scientific Committee of Globelics, and was the president of the International Schumpeter Society, from 2014 to 2016, of which he organized the bi-annual conference in Montreal in 2016. He had been a consultant for UNIDO, UNCTAD, IADB, CIDA, CNRC, Conseil de la science et de la technologie du Québec, Industry Canada, Finances Québec, Economic Development Canada, and other national and international agencies. Several awards have underlined the quality of his work. In 1983, he received the John Porter Award. In 1994 he was made a member of the Royal Society of Canada (Academy N. 2). In 1995 he received a Fulbright Fellowship and became a visiting scholar at Stanford University Center for Economic Policy Research (1995–1996). In 2001 he received Canada Research Chair on the Management of Technology and Technology Policy, for a first mandate up to 2008; at that date the chair was assessed and renewed up to 2015. In 2006, he received the Research Award of the School of Management at UQAM and he was a finalist contender for the Purvis Prize of the Canadian Economic Association. In 2009, he received the Prix Carrière en recherche at the Université du Québec, all disciplines and constituent campuses combined. The award emphasizes the quality of his scientific work, as well as his contribution to the training of young researchers, and his role as founder of CIRST. In 2016, he retired and became an Emeritus Professor at the School of Management, UQAM.

Noisi died on 8 May 2023.

== Latest publications ==
- Jorge Niosi (2010), "Building National and Regional innovation systems" Edward Elgar Publishing - 264 pages - 2010 ISBN 9781849802543
