= Springboard Theory =

International business theory

The springboard theory or springboard perspective is an international business theory that elucidates the unique motives, processes and behaviors of international expansion of emerging market multinational enterprises (EM MNEs). Springboard theory was developed by Luo and Tung (2007), and has since been used to examine EM MNEs. At the core of this theory is the argument that EM MNEs systematically and recursively use international expansion as a springboard to acquire critical resources needed to compete more effectively against their global rivals at home and abroad and to reduce their vulnerability to institutional and market constraints at home. These efforts are systematic in the sense that “springboard” steps are deliberately designed as a grand plan to facilitate firm growth and as a long-range strategy to establish more solidly their competitive positions in the global marketplace. They are also recursive because such “springboard” activities are recurrent and revolving (i.e., outward activities are strongly integrated with activities back home).

== Unique motives ==
According to Luo and Tung (2007), EM MNEs use international expansion as a springboard to (1) compensate for their competitive disadvantages, (2) overcome their latecomer disadvantage, (3) counter-attack global competitors’ major foothold in their home country market, (4) bypass stringent trade barriers into advanced markets, (5) alleviate domestic institutional and market constraints, (6) secure preferential treatments from home governments, and (7) exploit competitive advantage in other emerging and developing countries. In so doing, EM MNEs overcome their latecomer disadvantage in global competition via a series of aggressive, radical, risk-taking foreign direct investment (FDI) measures by proactively acquiring or buying critical assets from mature, often Western-based MNEs to compensate for their competitive weaknesses. EM MNEs are both asset seeking (especially critical capabilities they need, such as global brands, key technologies, global talents and international channels) and opportunity seeking (especially leveraging their mass and cost-efficient production capabilities to tap other developing countries and low- to mid-end markets in developed countries).

Thus, unlike Western MNEs who are generally motivated to go global to exploit their ownership-specific capabilities they have already possessed, EM MNEs go global to acquire strategic capabilities they do not have but critically needed to upgrade their capability portfolio in search for competitiveness in global competition. In contrast to newly industrialized economy MNEs (e.g., those from South Korea, Singapore, Hong Kong, Taiwan) whose international expansion has been largely triggered by “push” factors such as appreciating currencies, rising labor costs and shortages, escalating operating costs, and smaller home markets, EM MNEs’ global expansion has been driven mainly by “pull” factors such as securing critical capabilities and resources, circumventing host country trade barriers, upgrading home-market capabilities, and seeking international reputation.

== Strategic behaviors ==
EM MNEs use their inward FDI experience and networks (e.g., original equipment manufacturing, international joint ventures) at home before undertaking outward FDI. Through inward internationalization, EM MNEs have accumulated experience and absorptive capabilities dealing with international competition, deepening their understanding of international markets before conducting outbound FDI.

More evidently, there are several leapfrog trajectories to mirror EM MNEs’ springboard behaviors. First, they tend to internationalize very rapidly and not in an incremental fashion as predicted by conventional internationalization process theory. As global latecomers, EM MNEs accelerate their pace of internationalization so as to catch up with that of incumbents. Large EM MNEs rapidly expand internationally through high-risk, high-control entry modes such as big acquisitions and greenfield investments. Second, EM MNEs tend to be radical in their choice of location (country), showing a pattern of path departure from cultural, institutional, economic and geographical distances. Very often, they first venture into advanced markets. Third, EM MNEs’ initial commitment tends to be large and does not necessarily involve many small steps. Also, departing from the conventional wisdom of control, EM MNEs tend to use localized senior management team, rather than parent country nationals.

== Facilitating forces ==
Luo and Tung (2007) also explained some internal and external conditions that foster EM MNEs to springboard. Springboard behaviors of EM MNEs are promoted by (1) home government support for going global, (2) willingness of global players to share or sell strategic resources and offshore availability of standardized technology, (3) corporate entrepreneurship and strong motivation to enter key foreign markets, (4) increasing competitive pressure from global rivals, and (5) quick changes in technological and market landscapes and a heightened borderless world economy. Further research shows that they are further promoted by (6) inward FDI from advanced economies that enable EM MNEs to utilize established relationships to rapidly internationalize within business networks of MNEs from advanced economies.

== Challenges ==
The springboard theory cautions that despite opportunities and expected gains for springboard behavior, EM MNEs also encounter some huge challenges associated with such behavior. First, due to underdeveloped stock markets at home, poor accountability, and lack of transparency stemming from their ties with their host government, corporate governance of EM MNEs is generally weak. These limitations, in turn, tarnish their organizational reputation and hinder confidence of global stakeholders. Second, they face enormous post-springboard, post-acquisition difficulties, including building effective working relationships with host country stakeholders, reconciling the differing cultures at national and corporate levels, organizing globally dispersed complex activities, and integrating both home and host country operations. Third, lack of global experience, managerial competence and professional expertise have posed critical bottlenecks for many EM MNEs. Finally, weaker innovation can continue to handicap EM MNEs’ success in global competition.
