= Marie-Galante Airport =

- IATA: GBJ; ICAO: TFFM

Summary
- Airport type: Public
- Operator: Conseil Général de la Guadeloupe
- Serves: Grand-Bourg, Marie-Galante, Guadeloupe
- Elevation AMSL: 17 ft / 5 m
- Coordinates: 15°52′07″N 061°16′20″W

Map
- Location in Guadeloupe

Runways
Direction	Length		Surface
Direction	m	ft	Surface
09/27	1,240	4,068	Asphalt
- Sources: AIP, Google Maps GCM

Marie-Galante Airport (IATA: GBJ, ICAO: TFFM) is an airport serving the island of Marie-Galante in Guadeloupe. It is located 5.5 km (3.0 NM) east of Grand-Bourg, one of three communes on the island.

The Marie Galante non-directional beacon (Ident: MG) is located on the field.

== Airlines and destinations ==
Airlines	Destinations
Air Inter Iles	Pointe-à-Pitre

== See also ==
- Transport in Guadeloupe
- List of airports in Guadeloupe
