= Composition-Based View =

Business theory of growth without the benefit of resource advantages

The composition-based view (CBV) is a theory that explicates the growth of firms without the benefit of resource advantages, proprietary technology, or market power, proposed by Luo and Child in 2015. The CBV complements some existing theories such as resource-based view (RBV), resource management view, and dynamic capability – to create novel insights into the survival of firms that do not possess such strategic assets as original technologies and brands.

It emphasizes how ordinary firms with ordinary resources may generate extraordinary results through their creative use of open resources and unique integrating capabilities, resulting in an enhanced speed and a high price-value ratio that are well suited to large numbers of low- to mid-end mass market consumers. The CBV has been commented as “a new view with significant application” for emerging market firms and for small and medium sized enterprises in many countries. The view cautions though that composition-generated advantages are temporary in nature and that composition itself mandates special skills in distinctively identifying, leveraging, and combining open or existing resources inside and outside the firm.

== Definition ==
According to Luo and Child (2015), the term “composition” refers to the identification, configuration, and integration of (a) different sources of resources (e.g., acquiring applied technology and key components through licensing or purchasing, which are then further integrated with in-house production) and (b) different means of competition (e.g., price, value, design, technology, features, and services) to create a competitive advantage manifested in extended offerings (e.g., new product functions, extended consumer experience, and total business solutions), rapid market responses, and superior price-value ratios that suit particularly well the mass market.

There are three important concepts or notions that constitute composition. First, Compositional Offering – the firm uses open or available resources to provide customers with amalgamated values, services, and convenience at a reduced cost. It occurs when the firm extends product features, functions and services for customers who not only look for high value-price ratio but also total solutions, one-shop-for-all convenience, and amalgamated functions or services in a single product. Fast-paced life style, along with the expansion of middle-class consumers and digitization-based new consumerism, prompts the need for compositional offering.

Second, Compositional Competition – the firm combines and integrates different means of competition (e.g., quick responsiveness, low cost, new functions and features, customer-focused design, and extended warranty) to win competition. Compositional competition combines low cost, speed and quality means, providing customers with quick market responses and high price-value ratio. Compositional competitors deliver suitable technology at a low cost by leveraging mature technologies or R&D resources and by using open architecture or platforms that can significantly reduce production costs. These firms are astute in business intelligence involving both markets and technologies.

Third, Compositional Capability – the firm’s ability to bundle different resources and competitive attributes to create a certain competitive advantage. It shifts a focus from developing new resources to bundling existing resources, including those accessible from domestic or global open markets, as well as bundling competitive attributes such as quality, features, price, speed, innovation, design, and services. Entrepreneurial vision, market intelligence, absorptive capacity, and combinative capability are essential to accomplishing compositional capability.

== Main Points ==
According to Luo and Child (2015), compositional capability serves as the foundation on which compositional competition and compositional offering can build and forge ahead. This foundation determines how far the firm can go in adopting composition-based strategy. While compositional competition manifests the firm’s business-level strategy, focusing on the logic of using compositional building blocks for achieving a competitive edge, compositional offering expresses the firm’s operational-level strategy, pinpointing the value offering propensity (e.g., total solutions, one-stop services, or integrated functions) in a cost-effective manner. The above three elements reinforce one another, reflecting the faces of composition at the product level (compositional offering), market level (compositional competition), and organizational level (compositional capability). Yet, they collectively demonstrate a pragmatic and viable solution for the growth of ordinary firms that possess ordinary resources.

The CBV argues that firms with ordinary resources can establish some competitive position, at least temporarily, by creatively assembling and integrating the open and generic resources they possess or purchase. The term ‘ordinary resources’ refers to resources that are neither idiosyncratic nor costly to copy, and that can be purchased in an open market or secured from partner firms. The CBV informs the ways in which ordinary firms can survive by creatively using and bundling ordinary resources. CBV changes the view from developing and leveraging distinctive resources to distinctively using generic and open resources that are available. It is essentially a compensational remedy and a catch-up strategy for these companies in their efforts to compete against resourceful and powerful rivals equipped with strategic assets. Composition is a deliberate, intelligent, and pragmatic approach, offsetting these firms’ competitive weaknesses, yet requiring savvy organizational skills to achieve compositional advantages.

== Facilitating Conditions ==
While the CBV logic applies to any firm endeavoring to catch up with better endowed competitors, it aligns well with the case of emerging economies enterprises and small- and medium-sized enterprises in developed or developing countries. There are several external conditions that provoke the adoption of composition-based strategy, including:

- Sheer number of consumers who are sensitive to a product’s price, features functions, convenience and amalgamated values
- Availability of many specialized industrial design companies from home and abroad
- Industrial clusters and parks that support various value chain activities needed for domestic and foreign customers
- Presence of global and domestic open markets for technologies, key components, industrial tools, and specialized intermediaries
- Technological modularization or standardization and the pervasiveness of information and communication technologies (ICT)
- Growing business networks and partnerships

== Compositional Process ==
The composition-based strategy is achieved through the compositional process, which relies on the recognition and management of interdependencies, both inside the firm and with external network partners. Compositional process entails a set of key process capabilities, including:

- A strong entrepreneurial orientation aimed at exploiting external opportunities. Firms that follow the composition-based strategy are often led by executives who have sharp vision and who have adopted pragmatic measures in order to tap into new markets with a heightened entrepreneurial orientation.
- Network competence in the sense of an ability to pull together the resources required to enable the exploitation of external opportunities. Leveraging external resources requires drawing from a range of various sources and ties.
- An adept management system within the firm that maintains a fine balance between central direction and decentralized adaptive initiative. The combination of top-down vision with decentralized horizontal flexibility enables firms with ordinary resources to secure a competitive advantage by reducing lead times, speeding up problem solving, and hence adapting rapidly to market opportunities.
- A form of organizational ambidexterity that requires simultaneous attention to different resource categories with a view to their creative combination. The ambidexterity entails the balancing and integration of a range of resources in the bundling of competitive attributes.

== Links with Other Theories ==
The RBV argues that resources that are rare, valuable, inimitable, and non-substitutable are considered to be the source of sustained competitive advantage. The CBV complements with the RBV in that it does not emphasize possession of superior strategic resources as a necessary condition for the firm’s competitive advantage. Instead, the CBV underscores the use of multiple sources of open or generic resources – resources which when used in a creative composition may yield a competitive edge to the firm, at least temporarily. Also, the CBV points out that composition process is a distinct competence and critical capability that is valuable, heterogeneous, and not always easy to imitate.

Resource management is the comprehensive process of structuring the firm’s resource portfolio, bundling the resources to build capabilities, and leveraging those capabilities with the purpose of creating and maintaining value for customers and owners. However, in the resource management literature, the bundling process deals with internal or existing resources, the CBV extends this view by considering the composition of external open resources.

Consistent with the dynamic capability perspective, the composition process itself is a distinctive, firm-specific, and dynamic capability, that is, “the firm’s ability to integrate, build, and reconfigure internal and external competence to address rapidly changing environments”. While the dynamic capability perspective assumes that executives need to engage in resource adaptation or renewal because the value of existing resources depreciates in the light of external changes, the CBV focuses on the competitive advantage that can be gained from combining existing resources in novel ways.

== Limitations ==
According to Luo and Child (2015), there exist several limitations of the composition-based strategy:

- It increases the difficulty in building brand awareness and customer loyalty because firms that adopt this strategy serve pragmatic consumers who are indifferent to brands but mindful of product offerings. Therefore, these firms are facing competitive pressures from new entrants that use a similar composition strategy and from substituting products or services offered by similar rivals.
- Composition mandates a myriad of inter-unit synchronization within the firm and requires inter-firm coordination with outsiders residing in a related upstream and downstream vertical chain, as well as specialized intermediaries and service providers from supporting industries. Coordination costs and difficulties of orchestration may undermine composition-based success.
- Composition-based strategies may cause the firm to depend on external resources. However, the open markets are not yet perfect and may cause a higher level of uncertainty and vulnerability to the firms. Also, the firms that do not have strong power in network exchanges will suffer from unintended consequences stemming from resource dependency.
- The advantages of composition are temporary in nature and will decline over time, especially after the firm passes the imitative or catch-up stage, due to the lack of patented technologies, corporate credibility, and organizational reputation,
