= Saint-François, Guadeloupe =

Saint-François
- Commune
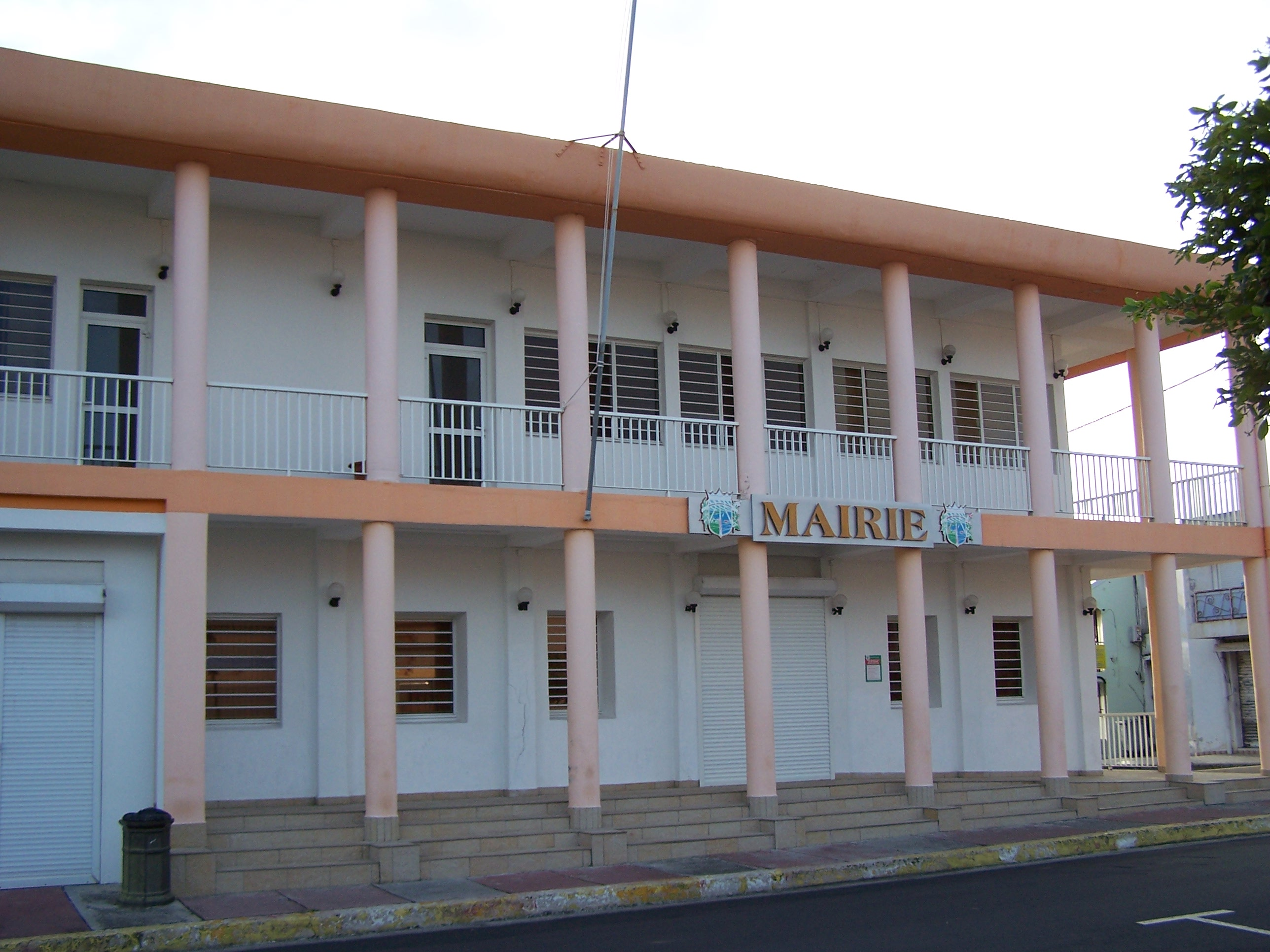
- The town hall of Saint-François

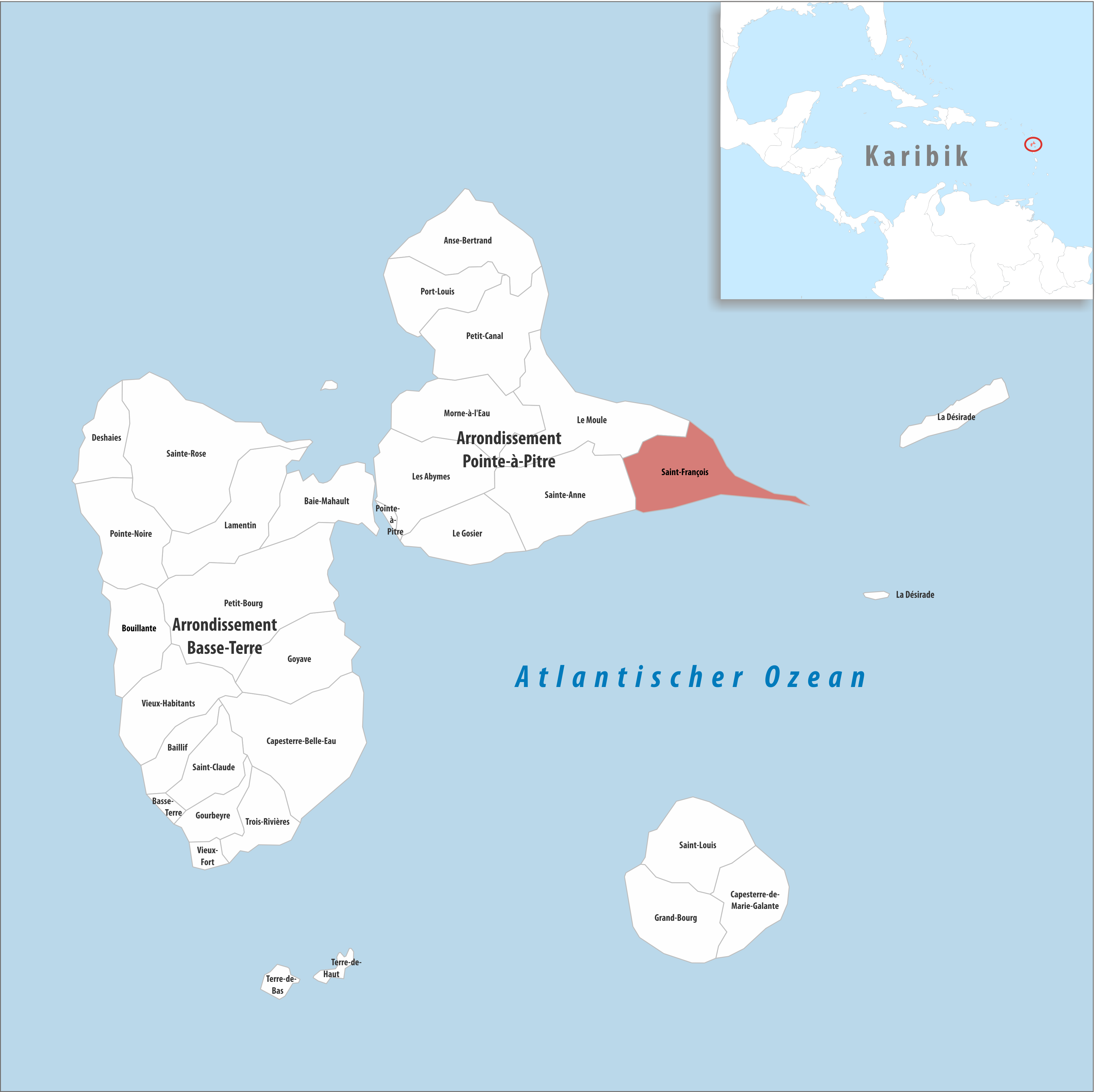
- Location of the commune (in red) within Guadeloupe
- Location of Saint-François
- Coordinates: 16°15′00″N 61°17′00″W
- Country: France
- Overseas region and department: Guadeloupe
- Arrondissement: Pointe-à-Pitre
- Canton: Saint-François
- Intercommunality: CA La Riviéra du Levant

Government
  - Mayor (2024–2026): Jean-Luc Perian
- Area^{1}: 61.00 km^{2} (23.55 sq mi)
- Highest elevation: 67 m (220 ft)
- Lowest elevation: 0 m (0 ft)
- Population (2023): 13,942
  - Density: 228.6/km^{2} (592.0/sq mi)
- Time zone: UTC−04:00 (AST)
- INSEE/Postal code: 97125 /97118
- ^{1} French Land Register data, which excludes lakes, ponds, glaciers > 1 km^{2} (0.386 sq mi or 247 acres) and river estuaries.

Saint-François (French pronunciation: [sɛ̃ fʁɑ̃swa]; Antillean Creole: Senfwanswa) is a town and commune in the French overseas department of Guadeloupe, located in the southeast point of the main island of Grande-Terre.

Settlements include Chassaing, and Dubedou.

There are four public preschools and eight public primary schools.

The Collège Alexandre Macal is a public junior high school.

== Population ==
Historical population
Year	Pop.	±% p.a.
1967	5,789	—
1974	5,593	−0.49%
1982	6,972	+2.79%
1990	7,987	+1.71%
1999	10,659	+3.26%
2007	13,886	+3.36%
2012	14,797	+1.28%
2017	12,816	−2.83%
2023	13,942	+1.41%
Source: INSEE

== La Pointe des Châteaux ==
La Pointe des Châteaux is a peninsula that extends into the Atlantic Ocean.

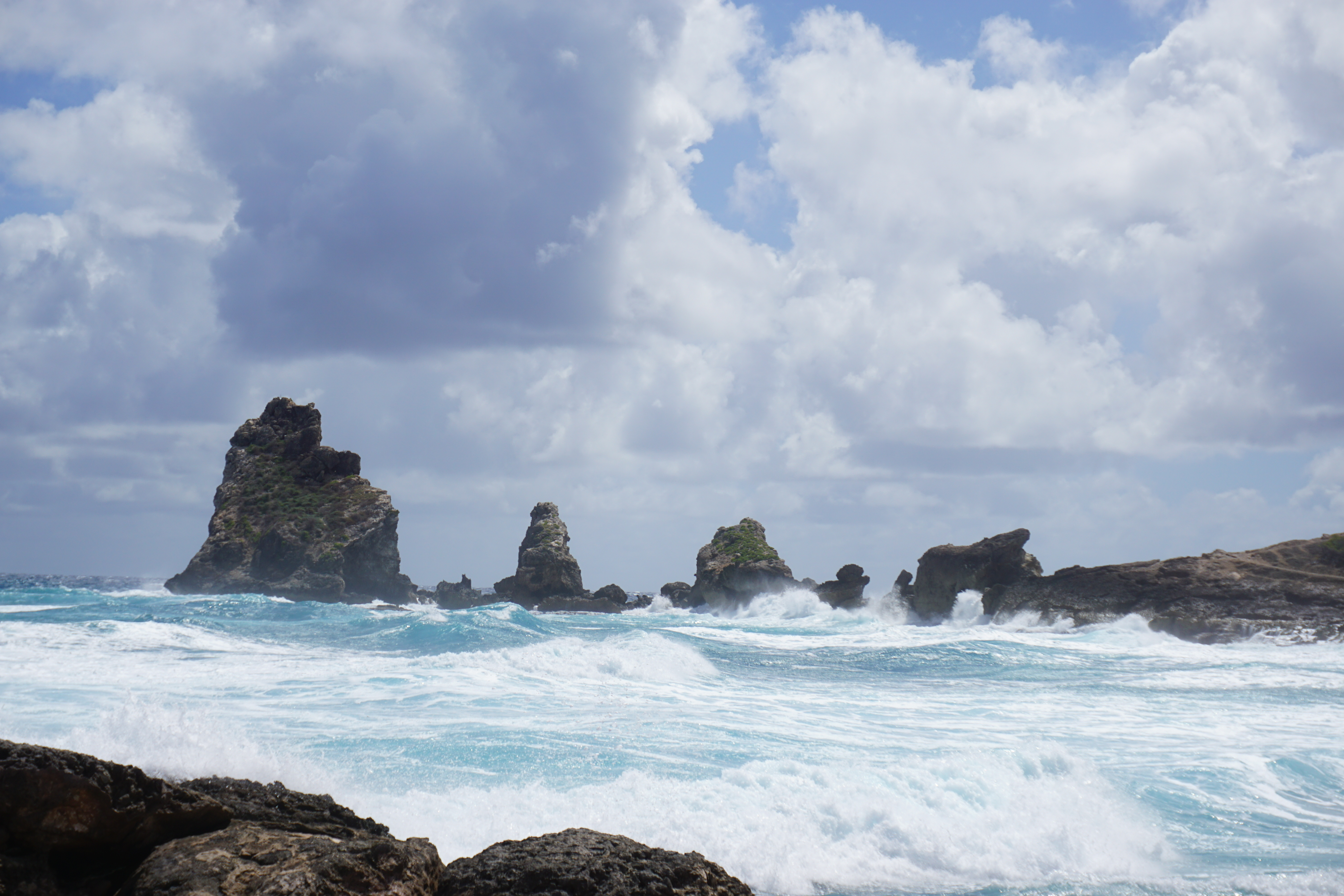
Pointe des Chateaux

Eleven kilometres east of Saint-François, a large littoral strip, La Pointe des Châteaux hosts rare fauna and flora, some of which are indigenous to the site.

It attracts about 500,000 visitors per year. North-west of the Pointe des Châteaux's clifftop is beach les Grandes Salines.

== Transportation ==
The city's air needs are fulfilled by the Saint-François Airport.

== Gallery ==
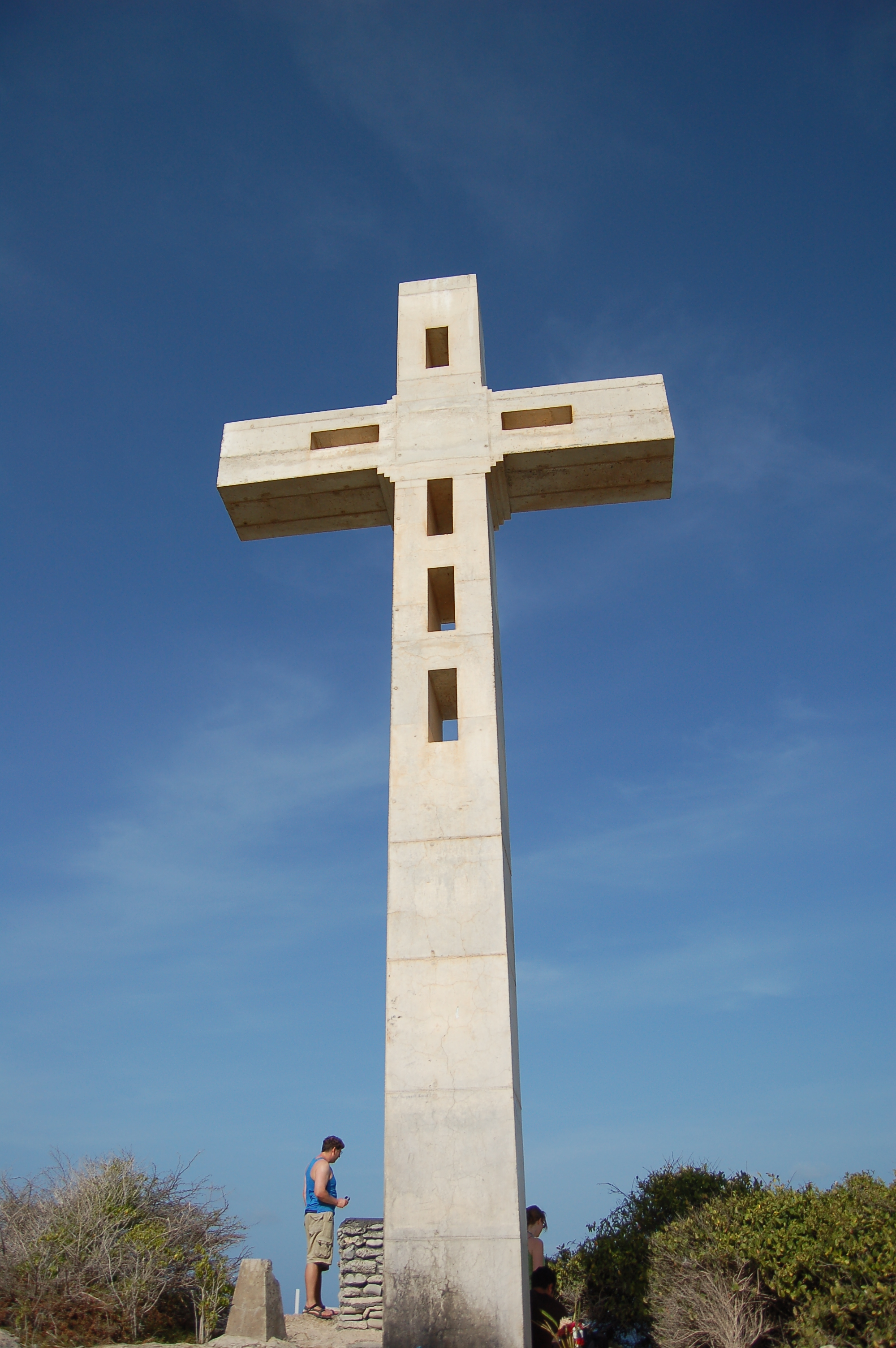
Cross at the very clifftop of the Pointe des Châteaux

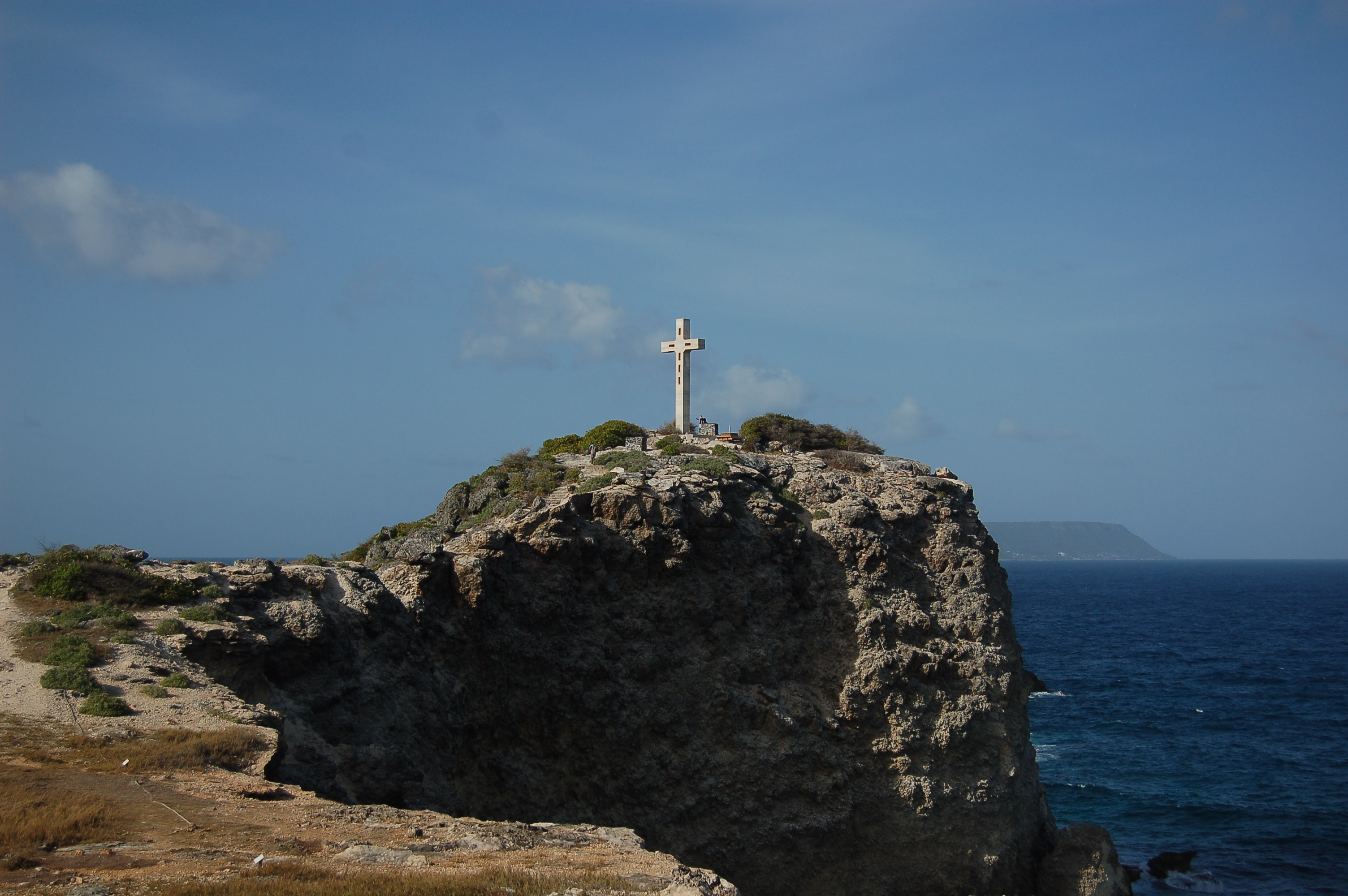
Cross at the Pointe des Châteaux and La Désirade out far

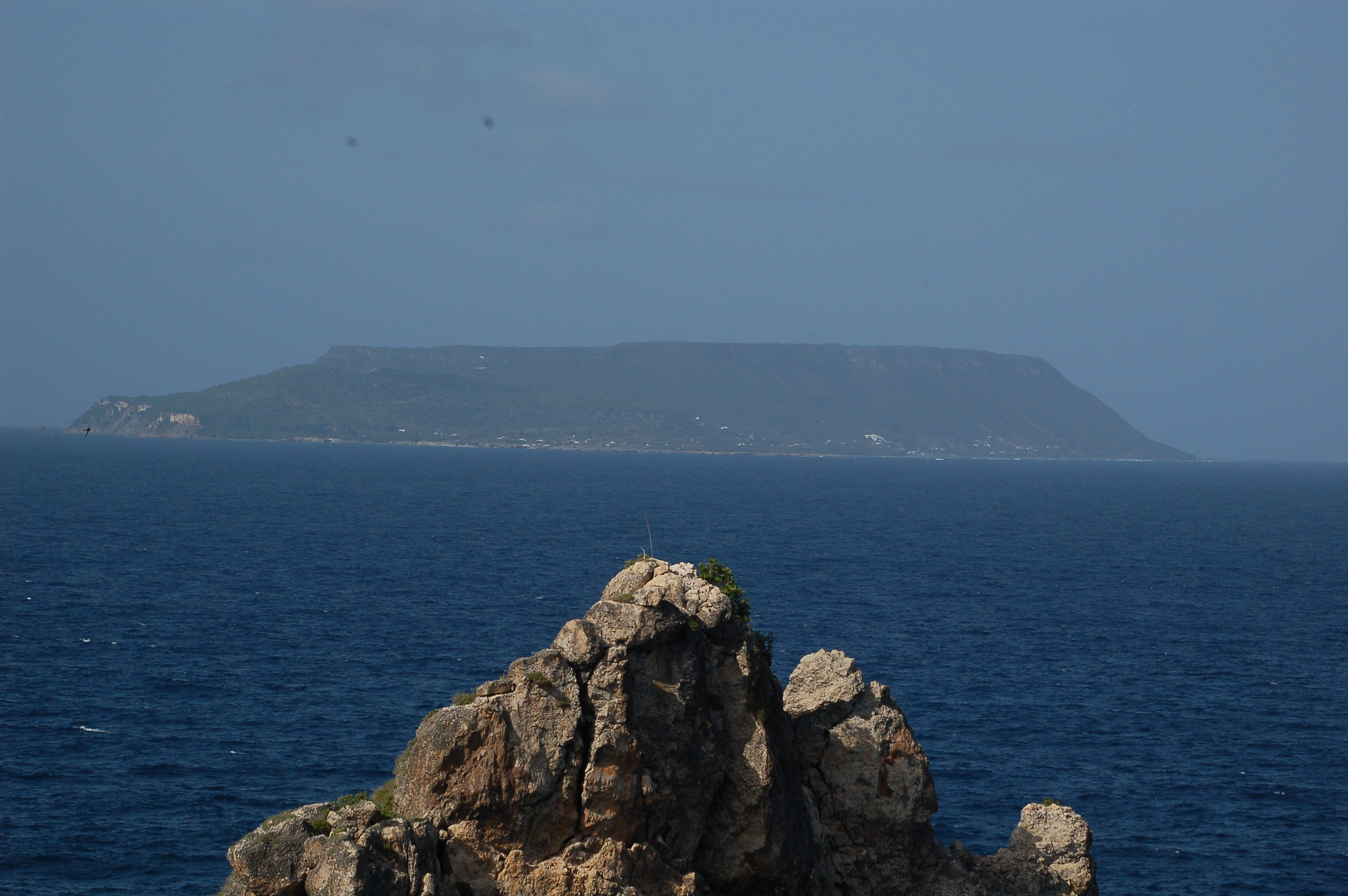
A far view of La Désirade from the Pointe des Châteaux

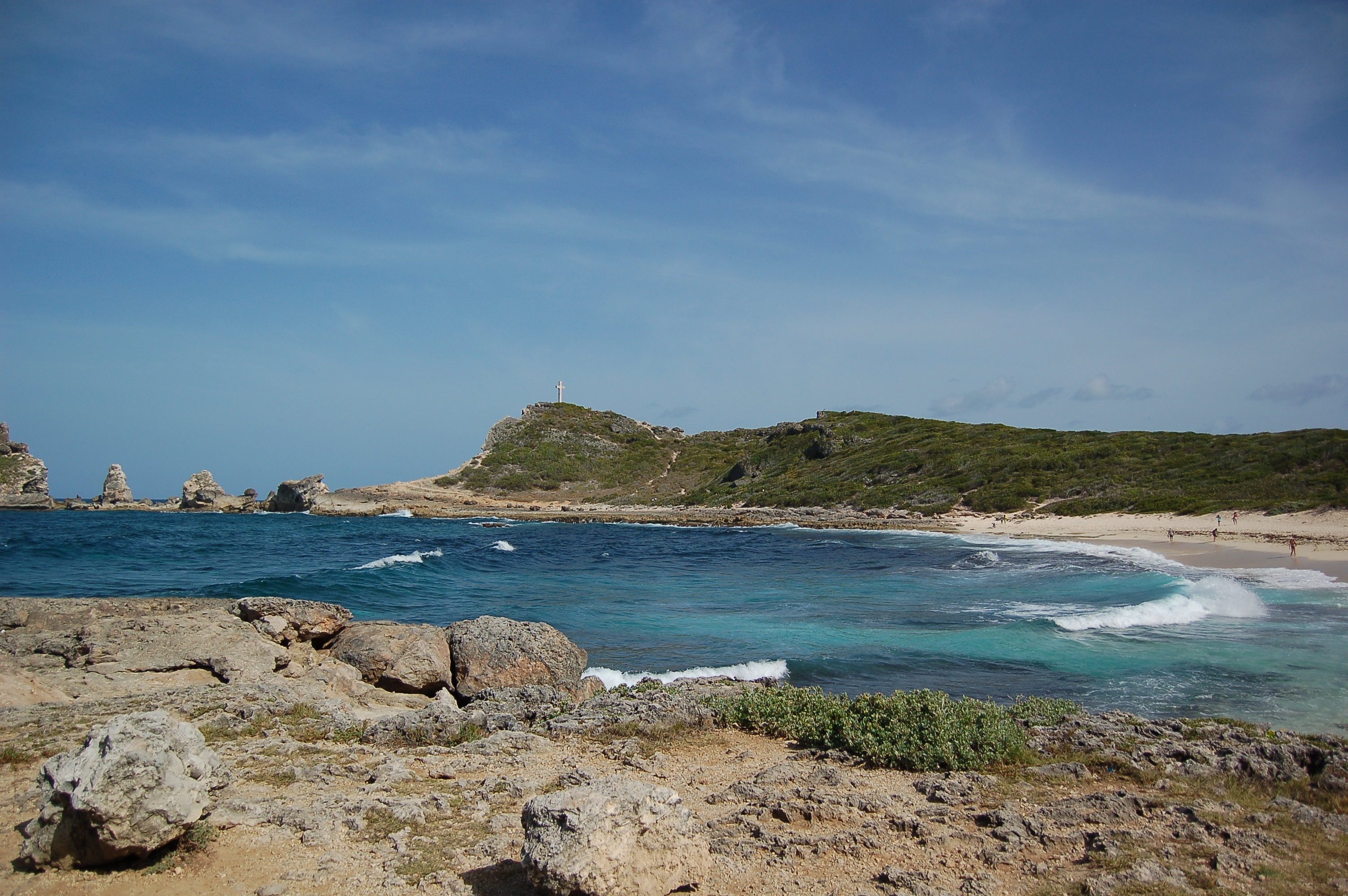
Pointe des Châteaux, Guadeloupe

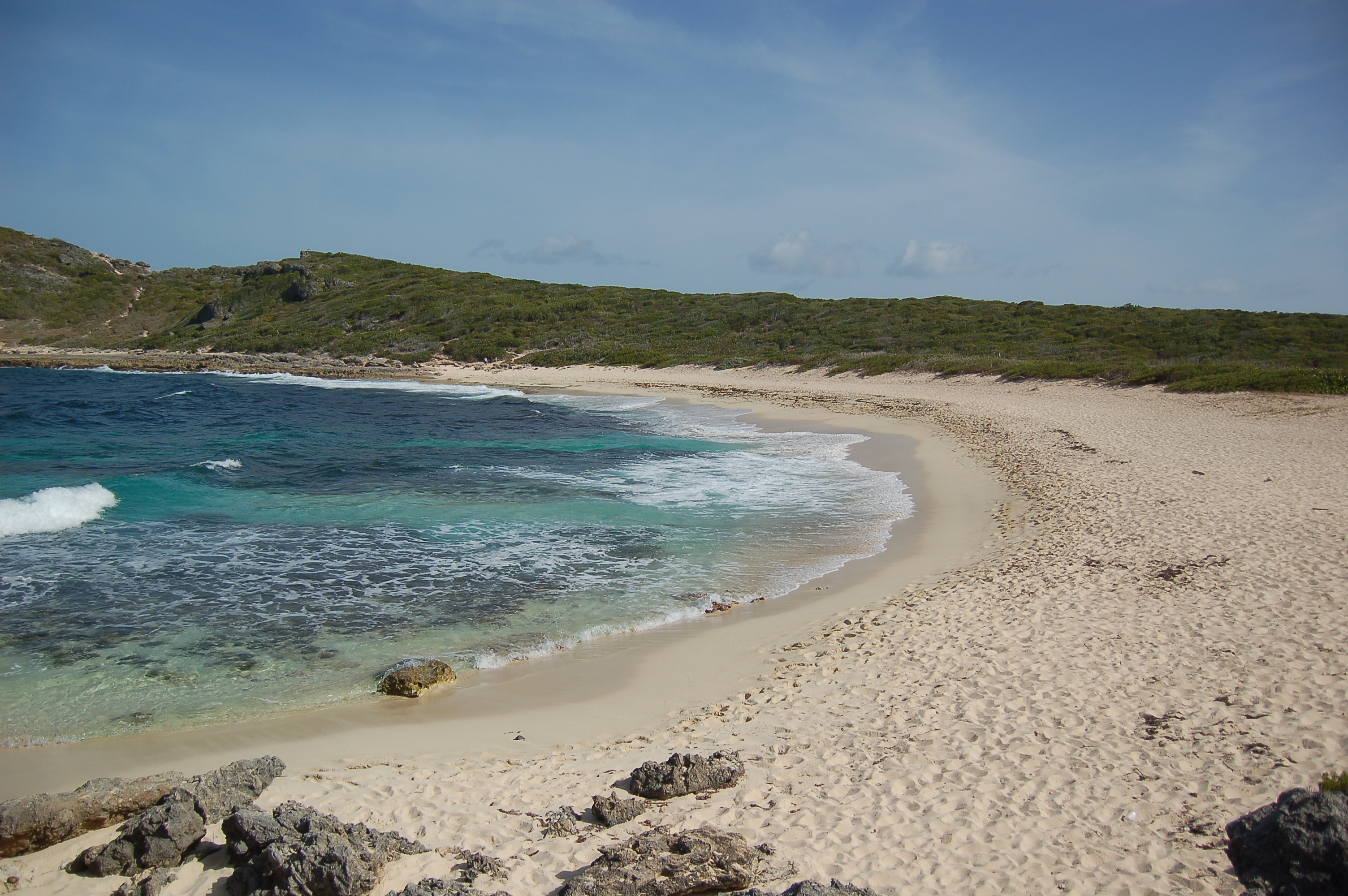
The long beach of Grandes Salines at Pointe des Châteaux

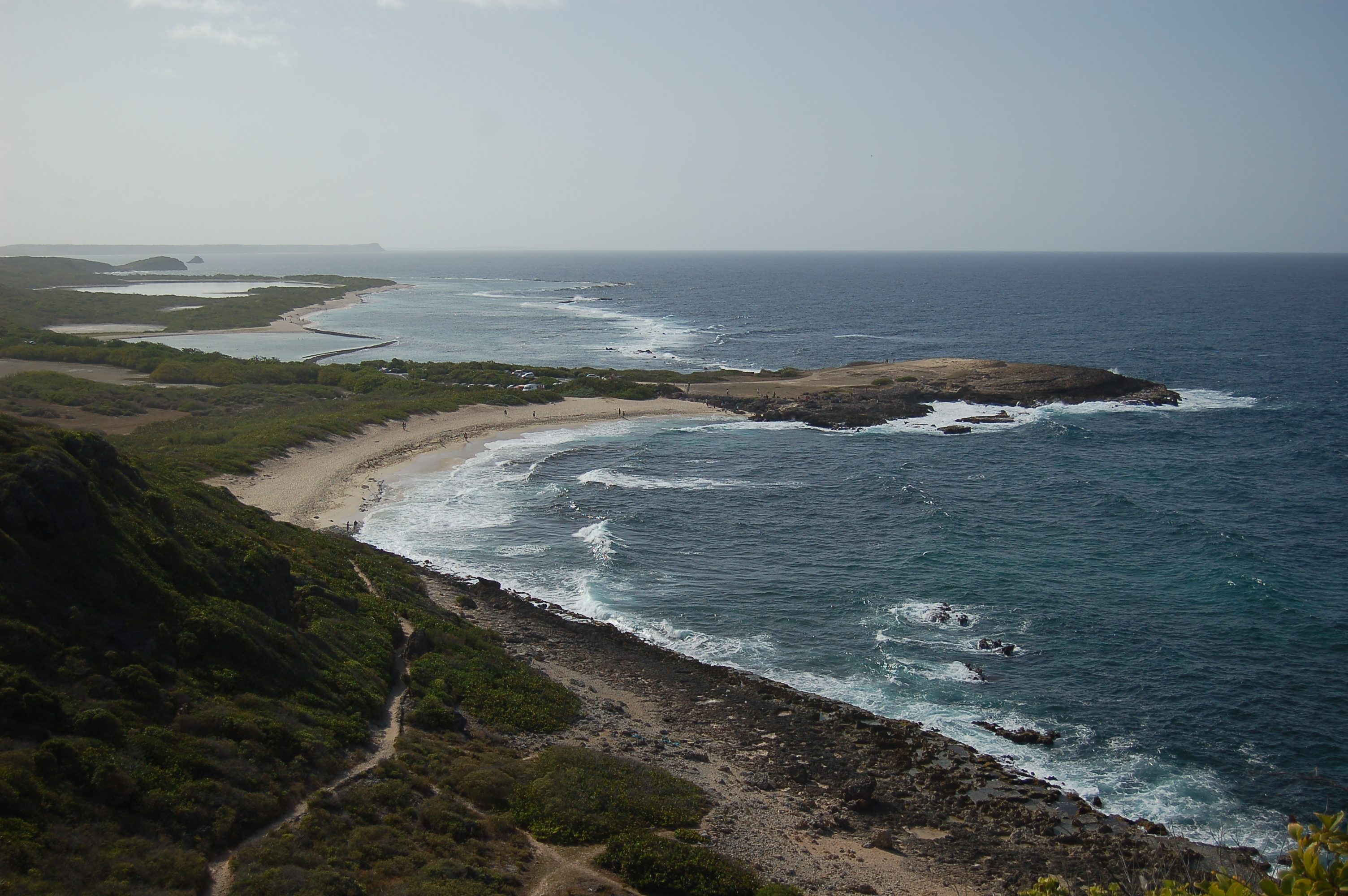
The long beach of Grandes Salines at Pointe des Châteaux
