= Global Co-opetition =

Co-opetition or coopetition – simultaneous competition and cooperation – is a philosophy or strategy that goes beyond the conventional rules of competition and cooperation to achieve advantages of both. According to Luo’s (2004) book “Coopetition in international business”, global co-opetition refers to the simultaneous competition and cooperation between multinational enterprises (MNEs) and their geographically dispersed business stakeholders such as global rivals, global suppliers, global distributors, global alliance partners, and foreign governments as well as among foreign subsidiaries within an MNE.

== Co-opetition with global rivals ==
MNEs seek to create value by sharing resources and committing to common task goals in some domains (e.g., product-market or value-chain activity) with their global rivals. At the same time, they compete by taking independent actions in other domains to improve their own performance. Co-opetition with global rivals can enhance an MNE's competitive position in the global marketplace where intertwined opportunities and challenges necessitate heightened competitive collaborations with various geographically dispersed rivals.

The co-opetition perspective sees competition and cooperation as two distinct yet interrelated, inclusive, and simultaneous dimensions. Along these two dimensions in a pairwise setting, a global player can be identified as a contender (strong competition – weak cooperation), a monoplayer (weak competition – weak cooperation), a partner (weak competition – strong cooperation), and an adapter (strong competition – strong cooperation). Different types should be aligned with different strategic responses so as to optimize an MNE's position in both competition and cooperation with a major rival.

== Co-opetition with global suppliers and distributors ==
In today's interconnected economy and open competition, vertical co-opetition (as opposed to horizontal co-opetition with global rivals) with foreign suppliers and distributors can result in benefits. MNEs embrace these vertical co-opetiting players as potential collaborators because of intensified requirements for speed, integration and synchronization of entire value chain activities. Nevertheless, MNEs bargain and compete with their global suppliers and distributors toward self-profit maximization.

Partnering with suppliers ensures lower purchase price, better quality, timely delivery, access to complementary competencies, and greater supports in product development. Collaboration with distributors can lead to broader market research, quicker market response, and greater access to a larger customer base. In fact, research on vertical co-opetition with suppliers and distributors has recently begun to noticeably rise in the fields of both marketing and operations management.

== Co-opetition with corporate members within an MNE ==
Within the same MNE, co-opetition occurs between or among geographically dispersed subunits. An MNE is an internally differentiated yet globally coordinated network. With heightened interdependence in resource or knowledge sharing, value-chain rationalization, and common function integration, foreign subsidiaries increasingly cooperate between themselves, bilaterally or multilaterally, in pursuit of synergistically collective gains while synchronically competing for parent resources, corporate support, system position, and market expansion.

Foreign subsidiaries within an MNE can be classified, along levels of simultaneous competition and cooperation, into four types: aggressive demander (strong competition – weak cooperation), silent implementer (weak competition – weak cooperation), ardent contributor (weak competition – strong cooperation), and network captain (strong competition – strong cooperation). Competition and cooperation are contingent upon several factors (e.g., strategic interdependence, subsidiary form, technological linkage, etc.) that determine the interrelatedness between different subunits.

== Co-opetition with global alliance partners ==
Competition (control) and cooperation are two central concepts in all global strategic alliances. Control is the process by which one party influences the behavior and output of another party through the use of power, authority, and mechanisms. Cooperation involves collective efforts, through mutual forbearance, commitment, and trust building, to better allocate and exploit complementary resources such that all parties are better off than it would otherwise be.

Luo and colleagues (2008) developed a typology of the competition (control) and cooperation dualism that identifies partnerships involving varying private control and cooperation (contender, competitor, and honeymooner) and varying collective control and cooperation (loosely connected, equity hostage, tightly integrated, and trusting). A global alliance partner's strategic responses vary under different typology identities and are influenced by relational characteristics such as goal congruity, resource complementarity, and bargaining asymmetry between foreign and local partners.

== Co-opetition with foreign governments ==
MNE-host government relations contain both cooperation and competition elements that function simultaneously. Cooperation emerges as a mutual response to the fact that both MNEs and governments are increasingly and strategically interdependent along four levels: country-level internationalization, industry-level competitiveness, firm-level capability, and individual-level productivity. Competition arises to fulfill the respective goals of MNEs and foreign governments through bargaining and competing for input-, process-, and outcome-based resources.

MNEs possessing varying degrees of cooperation and competition with foreign governments can be identifies as a contender (strong competition – weak cooperation), an estranger (weak competition – weak cooperation), a partner (weak competition – strong cooperation), and an integrator (strong competition – strong cooperation). It is important to properly configure – both initially and evolutionarily – cooperation and competition based on environmental dynamics such as economic development, political stability, regulatory deterrence, and industrial growth.
