= Marie-Galante =

Island of Guadeloupe, an overseas department of France

Coordinates: 15°56′N 61°16′W

Native name: Marie-Galante
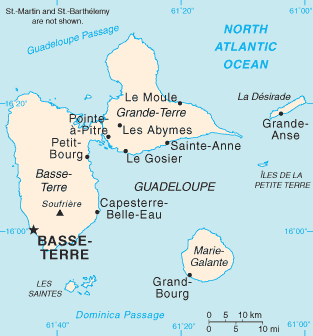
- Map of Guadeloupe, with Marie-Galante in the south

- Location within Lesser Antilles Location within the Caribbean

Geography
- Location: Caribbean Sea
- Archipelago: Lesser Antilles
- Area: 158.1 km^{2} (61.0 sq mi)
- Highest elevation: 204 m (669 ft)
- Highest point: Morne Constant

Administration
- France
- Overseas department: Guadeloupe

Demographics
- Population: 10,867 (2016)

Additional information
- Time zone: AST (UTC-4:00)

Marie-Galante (French pronunciation: [maʁi ɡalɑ̃t], Guadeloupean Creole: Marigalant) is one of the dependencies of Guadeloupe, an overseas department of France. Marie-Galante has a land area of 158.1 km^{2} (61.0 square miles). It had 11,528 inhabitants at the start of 2013, but by the start of 2018 the total was officially estimated to be 10,655, with a population density of 62.5/km^{2} (162/sq mi).

== Administration ==
Marie-Galante is divided into three communes (with populations as of 1 January 2013):

- Grand-Bourg (5,564 residents),
- Capesterre-de-Marie-Galante (3,389) and
- Saint-Louis (2,575).

These three communes formed an intercommunal entity in 1994: the Community of Communes of Marie-Galante (French: communauté de communes de Marie-Galante). This is the oldest intercommunal structure of the overseas regions of France.

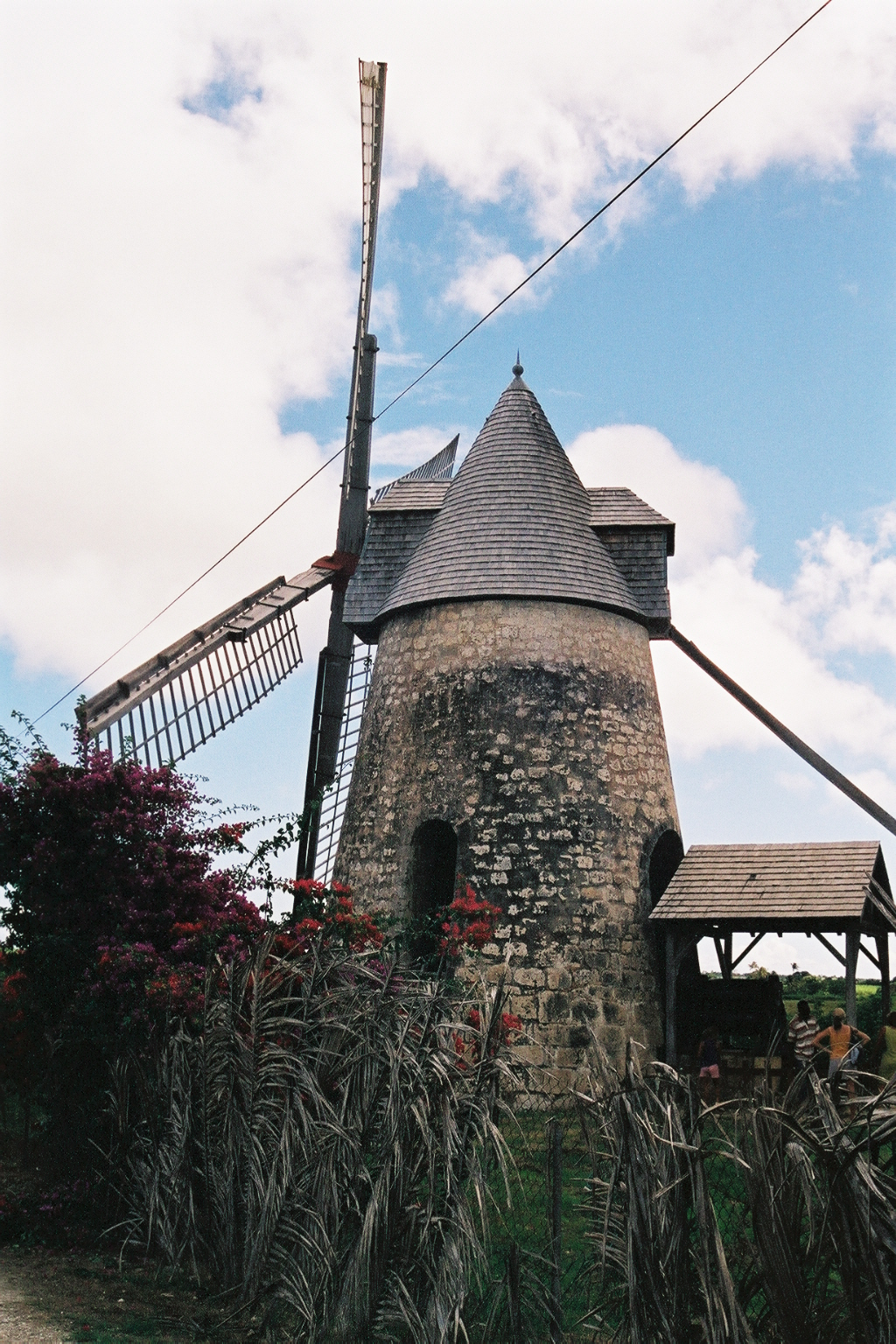
Moulin Bezard, Historic Monument of France, windmill built around 1840, stopped working around 1920.

== History ==
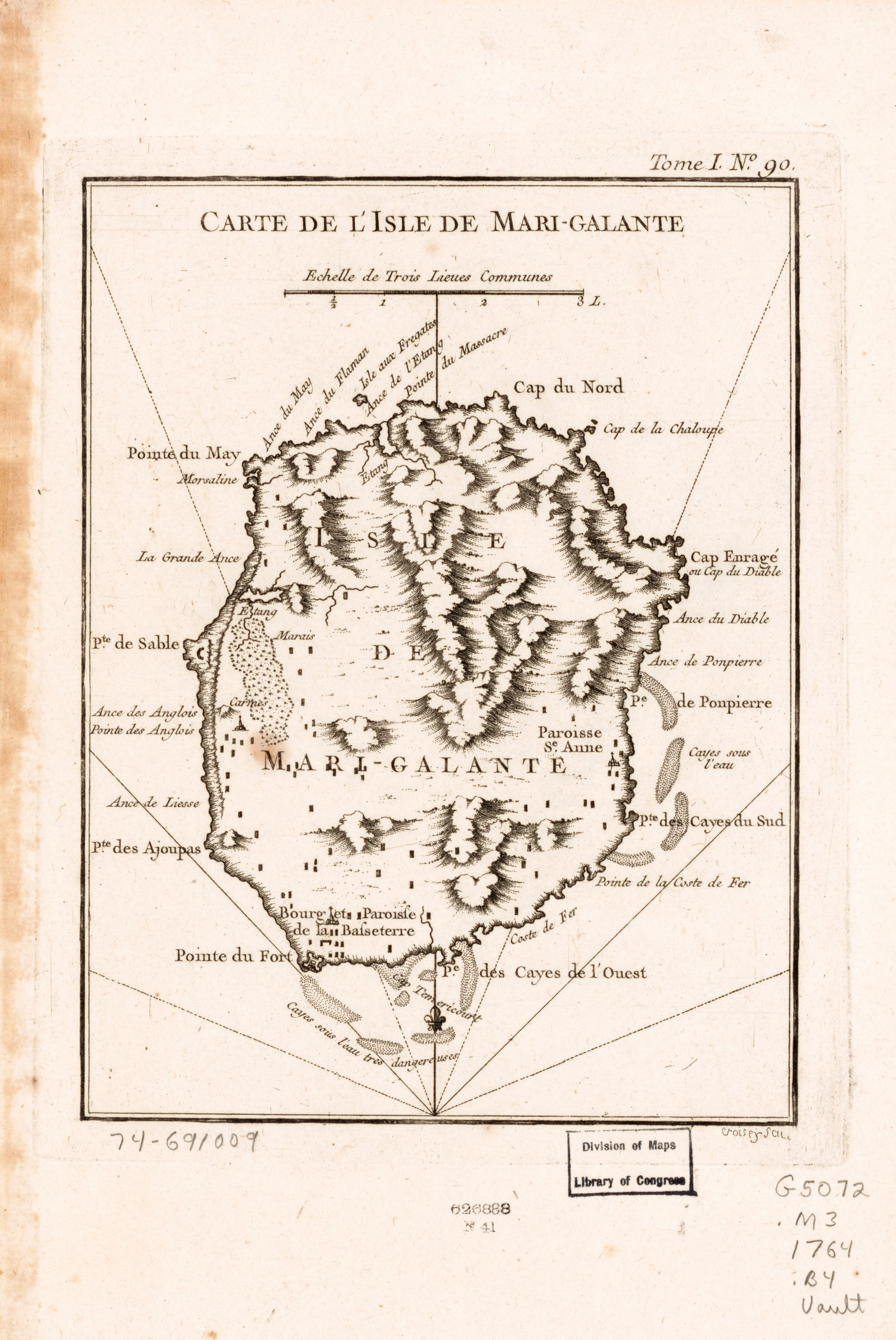
Map of the island of Marie-Galante, Belin Jacques Nicolas, 1764.

The Huecoids are the oldest known civilizations to have occupied Marie-Galante, followed by Arawaks, and then by the Island Caribs circa 850. The island was called Aichi by the Caribs and Touloukaera by the Arawaks.

=== Spanish exploration ===
Marie-Galante was the second island encountered by Christopher Columbus during his second voyage, after Dominica. On 3 November 1493, he anchored at the islet now called Anse Ballet in Grand-Bourg, and named the island in honor of the flagship Marigalante (‘gallant Mary’) of the second voyage.

During his second voyage to the West Indies, he designated the first island he found as La Deseada, both islands were registered under Spanish sovereignty in the respective acts. According to L. Martinez de Isasti, a century after the encounter, the name is due to Captain Vasco Martin Cotillos who chose the name of his wife for the island.

=== French colonization ===
On November 8, 1648, Governor Charles Houël du Petit Pré organized the first occupation: about fifty men lived near the site called Vieux Fort "Old Fort". Jacques de Boisseret bought the island back from the French Company of the Islands of America on September 4, 1649. In 1653, the Carib Indians slaughtered the few remaining colonists who had not surrendered to the harsh living conditions.

Sugarcane, which probably originated in India, had been imported to the West Indies by Christopher Columbus. As sugar became a commodity, it was cultivated in Guadeloupe from 1654 by deported Brazilian colonists who created the first sugar plantations equipped with small ox-powered mills to crush the cane.

In 1660, at Basse-Terre Chateau, a peace treaty was signed in which the Caribs authorized the French and British to settle on the islands of Dominica and Saint Vincent. With the island now at peace, the availability of mill technology was developing into a plantation-based economy by using enslaved Africans.

In 1664, Madame de Boisseret gave up her rights to Marie-Galante to the Company of the West Indies, and the island then had its first four ox-powered mills. In 1665, her son Monsieur de Boisseret de Temericourt became the island's governor. The map of the island he established carries his coat of arms. During the second half of the 17th century, the first enslaved people were brought from Africa to Marie-Galante to cultivate plantations. In 1671, 57% of the inhabitants were black. Jewish Dutch exiles from Brazil also settled, bringing new methods for the cultivation of cane sugar.

In 1676, a Dutch fleet abducted the population and plundered its facilities. After the repopulation of the island, its new inhabitants were attacked for the third time by the Dutch and by the British in 1690 and 1691. These raids, which resulted in the destruction of the mills, the refineries and the depopulation of the island, caused the Governor-General of Martinique to forbid the re-population of the island until 1696. The British retook the island from 1759 to 1763, during the Seven Years’ War.

Windmills were first seen in 1780. By 1830, 105 mills were put in place, half of which were still ox-drawn. Today, 72 mill towers are still standing. From November 1792 to 1794, Marie-Galante, which was Republican, separated itself from the royalist government of Guadeloupe. European enslavement of Africans was first abolished in 1794.

=== British occupation ===
The British captured Guadeloupe, and with it Marie-Galante, la Désirade, and all Guadeloupe's dependencies, in April 1794. The Treaty of Amiens in 1802 restored them to France. With the restoration, the enslavement of Africans too was reinstated in 1802.

In March 1808 the Royal Navy took possession of Marie-Galante to stop French privateers using its port. In August a small French force attempted to recapture the island but the British garrison, consisting of Royal Marines, augmented by Sir Alexander Cochrane's first Colonial Marines, newly recruited from escaped enslaved Africans of the island, and by some troops from the 1st West India Regiment, defeated and captured the French. The British returned the island to France in 1815.

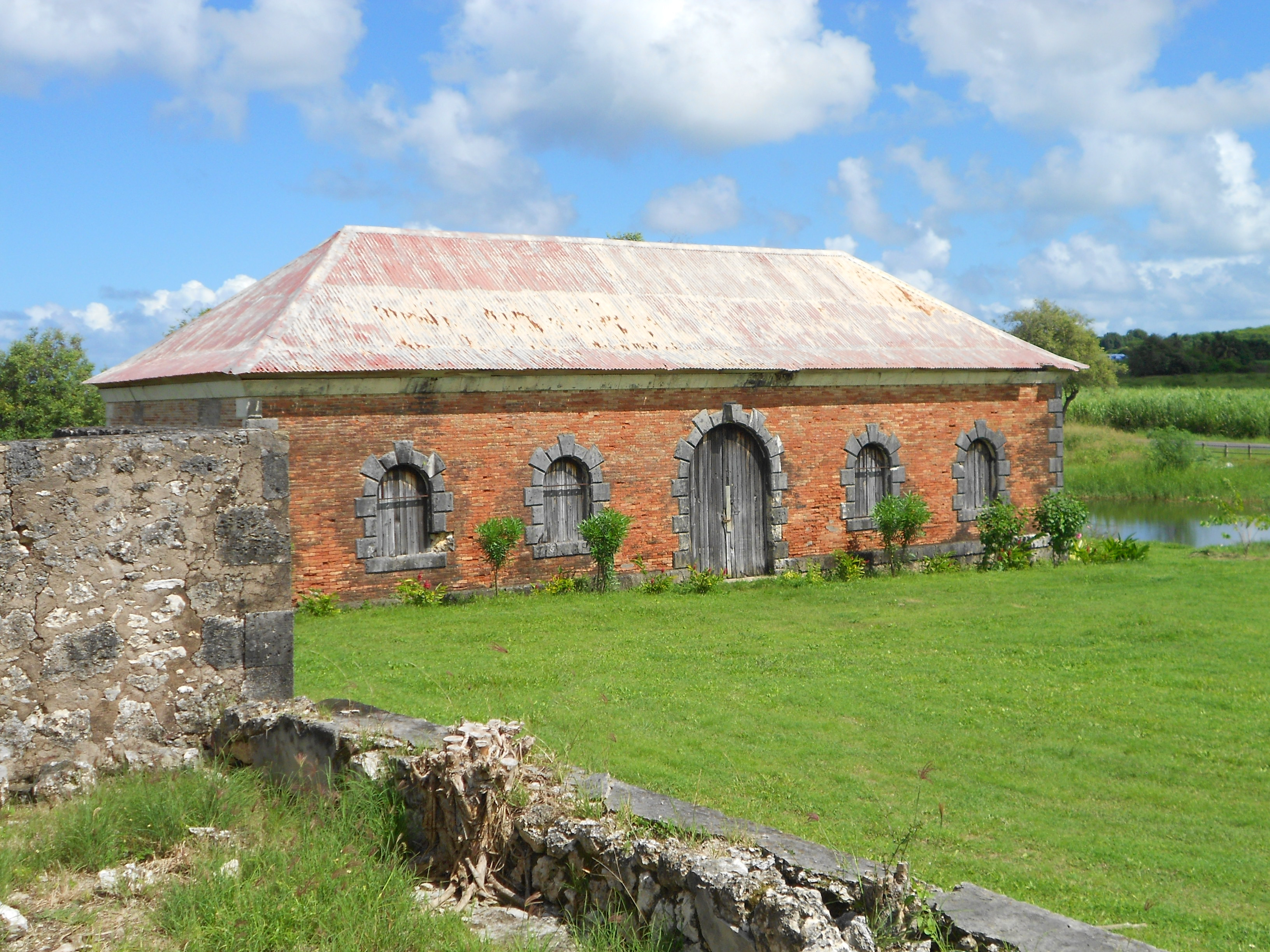
Ruins of the Trianon Sugar Factory established in 1669

Enslavement of Africans finally came to an end in 1848, thanks to the combined efforts of abolitionists, such as Victor Schœlcher, and repeated revolts of enslaved Africans.

=== Modern history ===
The legislative elections of June 24 and June 25, 1849, the first time former enslaved Africans were permitted to vote, were disrupted by the bloody violence of protesters which had risen up out of the black majority in response to ballot-rigging orchestrated by wealthy white plantation owners. Many black people were killed during these uprisings which led to the dumping of rum and sugar from the Pirogue plantation into a nearby pond. Today this pond is known as la mare au punch (‘the Punch Pond’) in memory of these tragic events.

Guadeloupe (Grande-Terre and Basse-Terre), along with its dependencies (Marie-Galante, Saint Martin, Saint Barthélemy, Îles des Saintes and la Désirade), have been an overseas department since 1946 and a single-department overseas region since 1982. Within Marie-Galante the three communes are Capesterre-de-Marie-Galante, Grand-Bourg and Saint-Louis. Together, these were designated as an intercommunal entity on January 8, 1994, the first to be created in an overseas department. In 2007, Saint-Martin and Saint-Barthélemy each became an overseas collectivity, making them politically separate from Guadeloupe.

Steven Callahan, who was lost at sea in a small (5-foot-6-inch (1.7 m) inside diameter) Avon life raft for 76 days, was found alive on April 21, 1982, off the coast of Marie-Galante by local fishermen Paulinus Williams, Jules Paquet and Jean-Louis Paquet, from neighbouring Guadeloupe.

== Geography ==
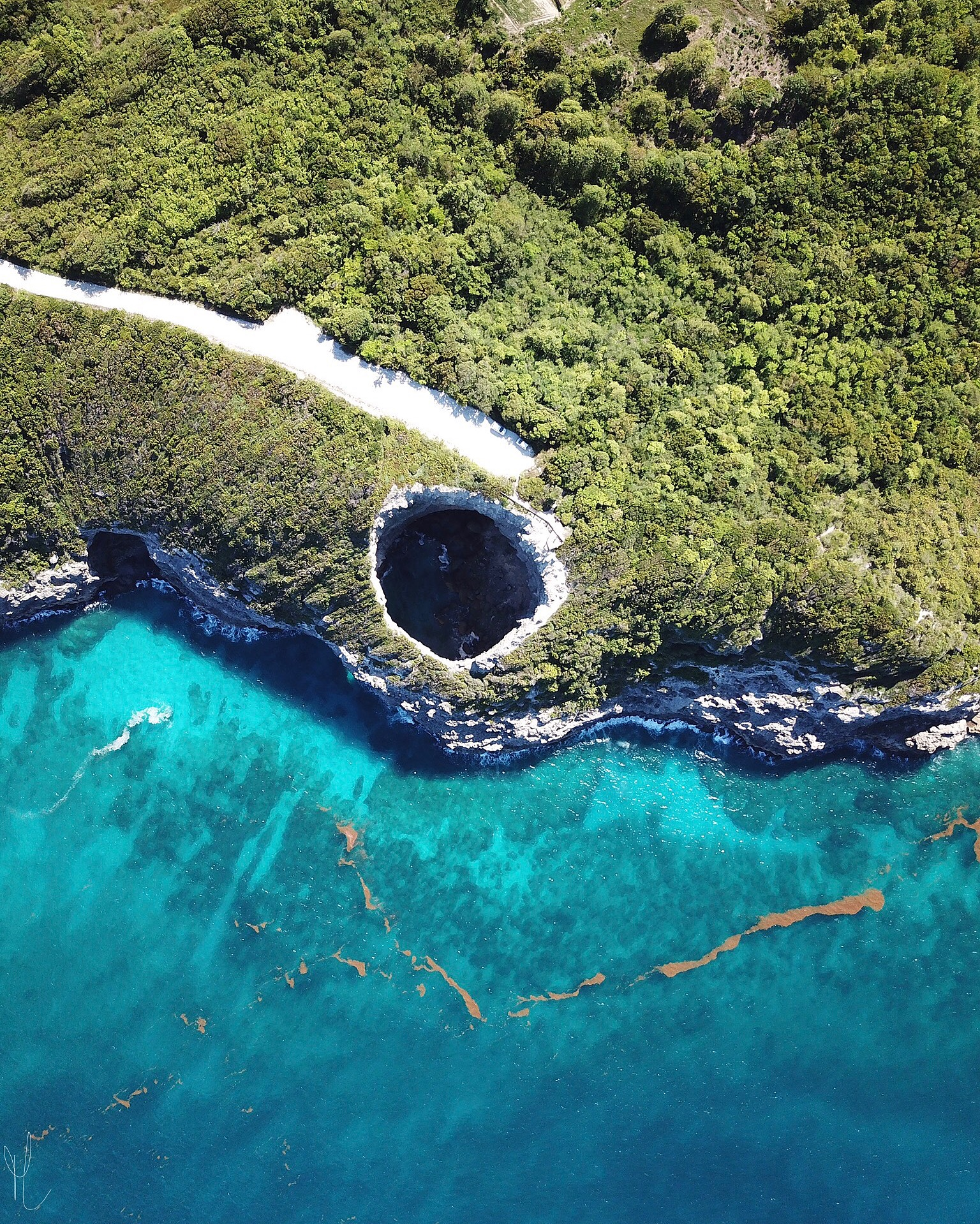
Gueule Grand Gouffre, Marie-Galante

Marie-Galante comprises three communes of France: Grand-Bourg, Capesterre-de-Marie-Galante, and Saint-Louis, Guadeloupe, with a combined 1999 census population of 12,488 inhabitants. The island is more commonly known as la grande galette (‘the Big Biscuit’) due to its round shape and almost flat surface; its highest peak, the Morne Constant Hill, rises to 204 m. The island is undulating substrate calcareous, cooled by the trade winds and subject to cyclones and earthquakes.

The northern coast is characterized by a high cliff. A fault line called the "Bar" separates the northern quarter from the remainder of the island. To the west, beaches and mangroves extend along the Caribbean Sea. The rivers of Saint-Louis and the Vieux-Fort run through the plateau that sits at the centre of Marie-Galante. In the East and the South, the plateau descends sharply to a coastal plain skirting the Atlantic Ocean from which it is protected by a barrier coral reef.

=== Location ===
Marie-Galante is located in the northern hemisphere, it belongs to the Caribbean (or Antilles) archipelago, between the Tropic of Cancer and the Earth's equator. It is located at 15°56' north latitude and 61°16' west longitude.

The island is about 6,200 km from mainland France, about 2,200 km southeast of Florida, about 580 km from the coast of South America (Venezuela) and, more specifically, with Guadeloupe, in the heart of the Lesser Antilles.

=== Topography, geology and hydrography ===
The island of Marie-Galante is an elevated atoll resting on a rugged limestone substrate, located on the outer arc of the Caribbean plate. A fault called "la Barre" separates the northern quarter from the rest of the island. The north coast, facing Grande-Terre, is characterized by a high cliff, while the highest point, the Morne Constant (204 m altitude), is located to the east, in the territory of the municipality of Capesterre-de-Marie-Galante.

The island has one main islet:

- l'îlet du Vieux-Fort or Vieux-Fort Islet.

Two rivers flow there after crossing the island's plateau from the heart of the island:

- The Vieux-Fort River (the second most important river on the island) - located in the north in the territory of the commune of Saint-Louis, it flows from east to west of the island of Marie-Galante, flows into the Atlantic Ocean south of the place called Vieux-Fort, which was the first European settlement on the island,6 at the height of the Anse du Vieux-Fort.
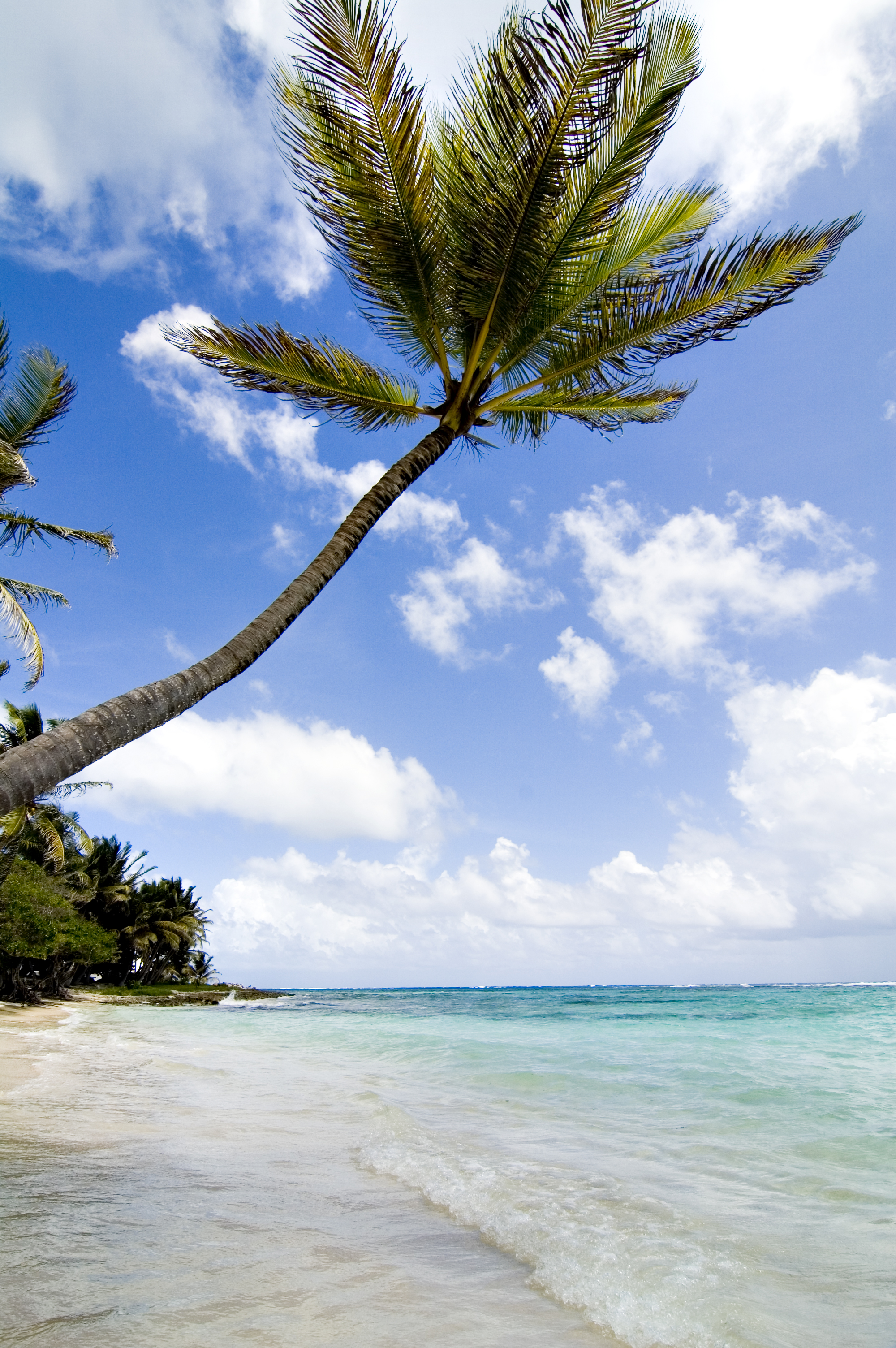
- Beach on Marie Galante
  The Saint-Louis River (formerly the Saint-François River), 17.3 km long, is the main river on the island. It rises to about 160 meters above sea level, at a place called Nesmond, in Capesterre-de-Marie-Galante, and then crosses the island from east to west through its middle and separates the municipality of Saint-Louis to the north from that of Grand-Bourg to the south. This watercourse, fed by the waters of many small ravines and streams, flows into the Atlantic Ocean south of the town of Saint-Louis, at the northern boundary of the Folle-Anse marsh.

=== Climate ===
Marie-Galante, like the rest of the Guadeloupe archipelago, enjoys a tropical climate tempered by the maritime influences and the trade winds to which it is subjected.

There are two seasons on Marie-Galante and the neighboring islands: a dry season locally called carême which runs from January to June, and a wet season locally called hivernage from July to December.

As for the temperature, with an average of 27 °C, there is little difference between the hottest months (from 25 °C to 32 °C) and the coldest (from 23 °C to 29 °C). Marie-Galante and its limestone plateaus can regularly suffer from severe droughts. The average seawater temperature is 28 °C.

Finally, the island is subject to hurricanes from May to November. These hurricanes form locally in the Antilles or off Cape Verde, in Africa, and drift in the trade winds from the east.

=== Landscape and environment ===
In the north of the island the landscape is characterized by the presence of a limestone cliff. To the east and south, the plateau becomes "mornes" to slope towards a coastal plain. The latter borders the Atlantic Ocean, from which it is protected by a barrier reef, the cays. To the west of the island, opposite Basse-Terre, beaches and mangroves extend along the Caribbean Sea and a natural coastal wetland extends into the part corresponding to the Folle-Anse Bay.

Marie-Galante is a biodiversity hotspot. Like the other Lesser Antilles, it emerged from the ocean less than five million years ago. This isolation has favored the emergence of a high rate of endemism. The archipelago was completely covered by forests before the arrival of Europeans in the 16th century. This arrival was accompanied by biological invasions and land clearing that had a serious impact on biodiversity.

Many species have disappeared from the island, and the natural environments of Marie-Galante are suffering somewhat from the retreat of the forest, the accelerated urbanization of recent years and the development of crops, especially sugar cane, all of which have reduced the importance of the forest and even caused it to disappear in some places. The cultivation of sugar cane has left its mark on the non-mountainous landscapes. The agriculture (mainly exporting) of sugar cane, alcohol (rum) continues to be strongly encouraged, to make it more "sustainable" and to stop its recession by Europe, the French State and the local authorities (Region and Department).

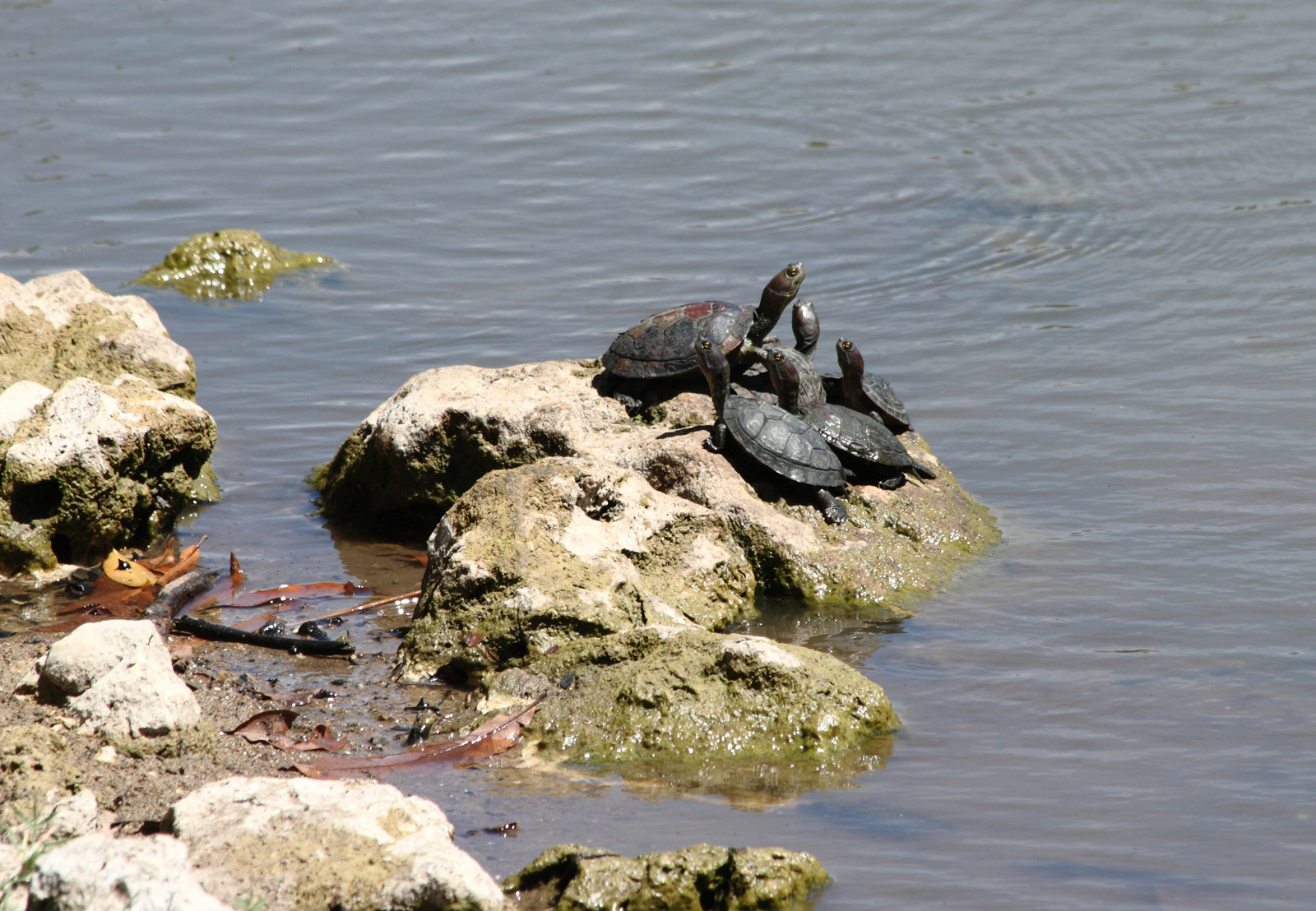
Group of turtles on the island

=== Fauna and Flora ===
On the island of Marie-Galante you can find reptiles such as the red-footed tortoise or molokoï, a species of gecko locally called mabouia and small lizards called anolis.

Some sea turtles also come to lay their eggs.

A variety of crab locally called touloulou is quite common.

To the west of the island there is a coral bank at about 20 meters depth.

And seagrass beds populate the coastal sandy bottoms, discontinuously.

=== Preservation ===
In Marie-Galante, the mangroves have almost disappeared, but there is one grove located in Vieux-Fort, Saint-Louis. Part of the terrestrial animal and plant heritage has been degraded as a result of human activities, except in the west, northwest, towards Saint-Louis, where the poorly developed fringing reefs still harbor many marine species.

Since 1992, Marie-Galante has been part of the biosphere reserve of the Guadeloupe archipelago. Guadeloupe, thanks in part to its islands, has become the overseas department with the most protected areas, including a national park.

=== Important Bird Area ===
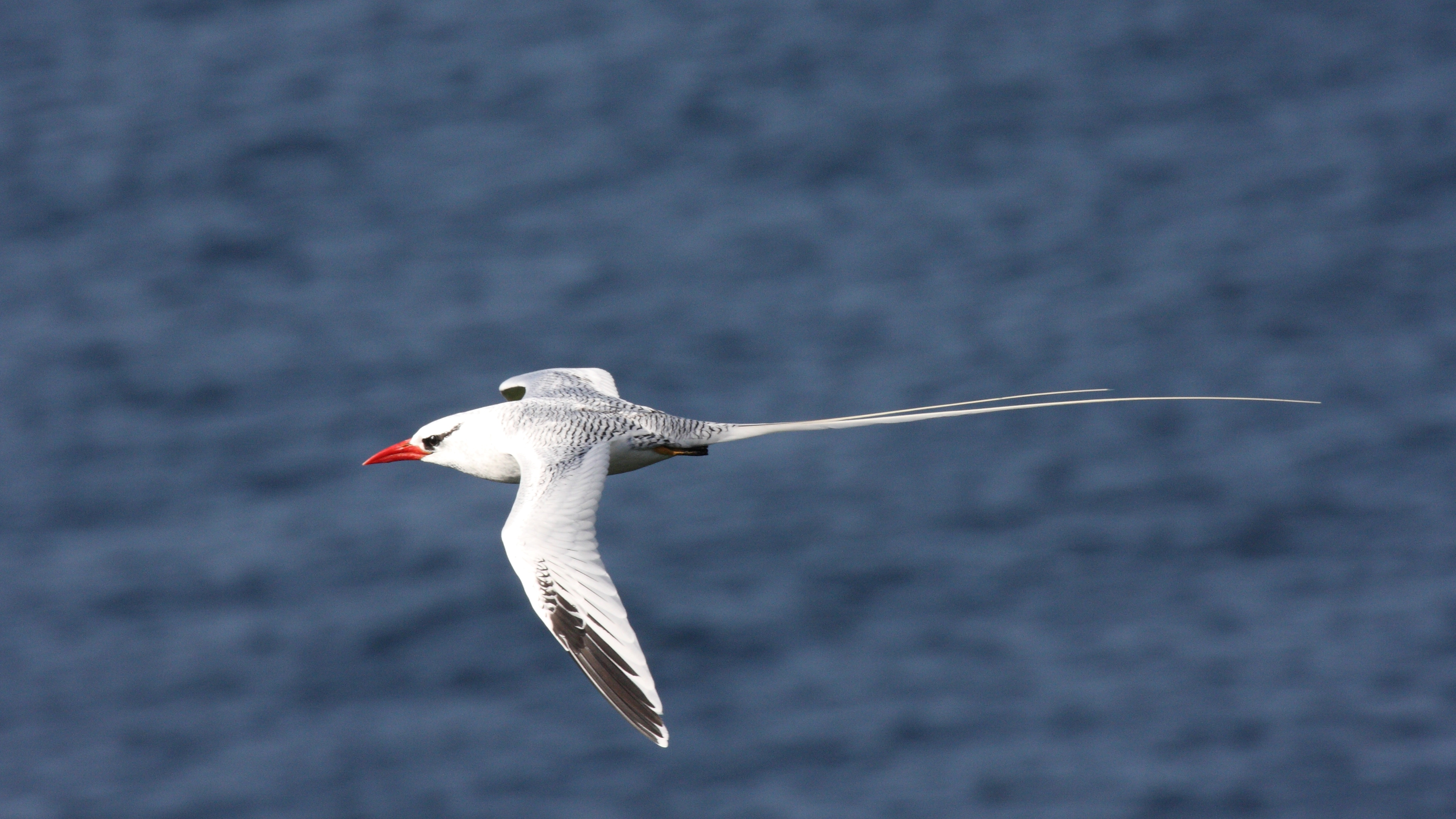
Red-billed tropicbirds breed in the IBA

A 1,780 ha, 14 km long, stretch of Marie-Galante's northern coastline, encompassing the 120 m high cliffs, their inshore waters and the flat islet of Vieux Fort, has been recognised as an Important Bird Area (IBA) by BirdLife International because it supports seabird breeding colonies of red-billed tropicbirds, brown noddies and bridled terns. The presence of Sargasso shearwaters has also been reported.

=== Natural Risks ===
Maria Galante is subject to many natural hazards, such as earthquakes, tsunamis, volcanic eruptions, and tropical cyclones. It has been the subject of a specific risk prevention plan.

=== Earthquakes and tsunamis ===
On November 21, 2004, Marie-Galante, Guadeloupe and, in particular, the Saintes archipelago were hit by a violent earthquake measuring 6.3 on the Richter scale, which caused the death of one person and extensive material damage.

On November 29, 2007, an earthquake measuring between 6.8 and 7.3 on the Richter scale, with its epicenter southeast of Roseau, the capital of Dominica, shook the Antilles. The earthquake was felt strongly in Marie-Galante, but did not cause significant damage.

The earthquake of February 8, 1843 is, to this day, the most violent earthquake known. It caused the death of more than a thousand people, as well as very significant damage in Pointe-à-Pitre.

=== Volcanic eruptions ===
La Soufrière, a large volcano located on the island of Basse-Terre in the Guadeloupe archipelago.

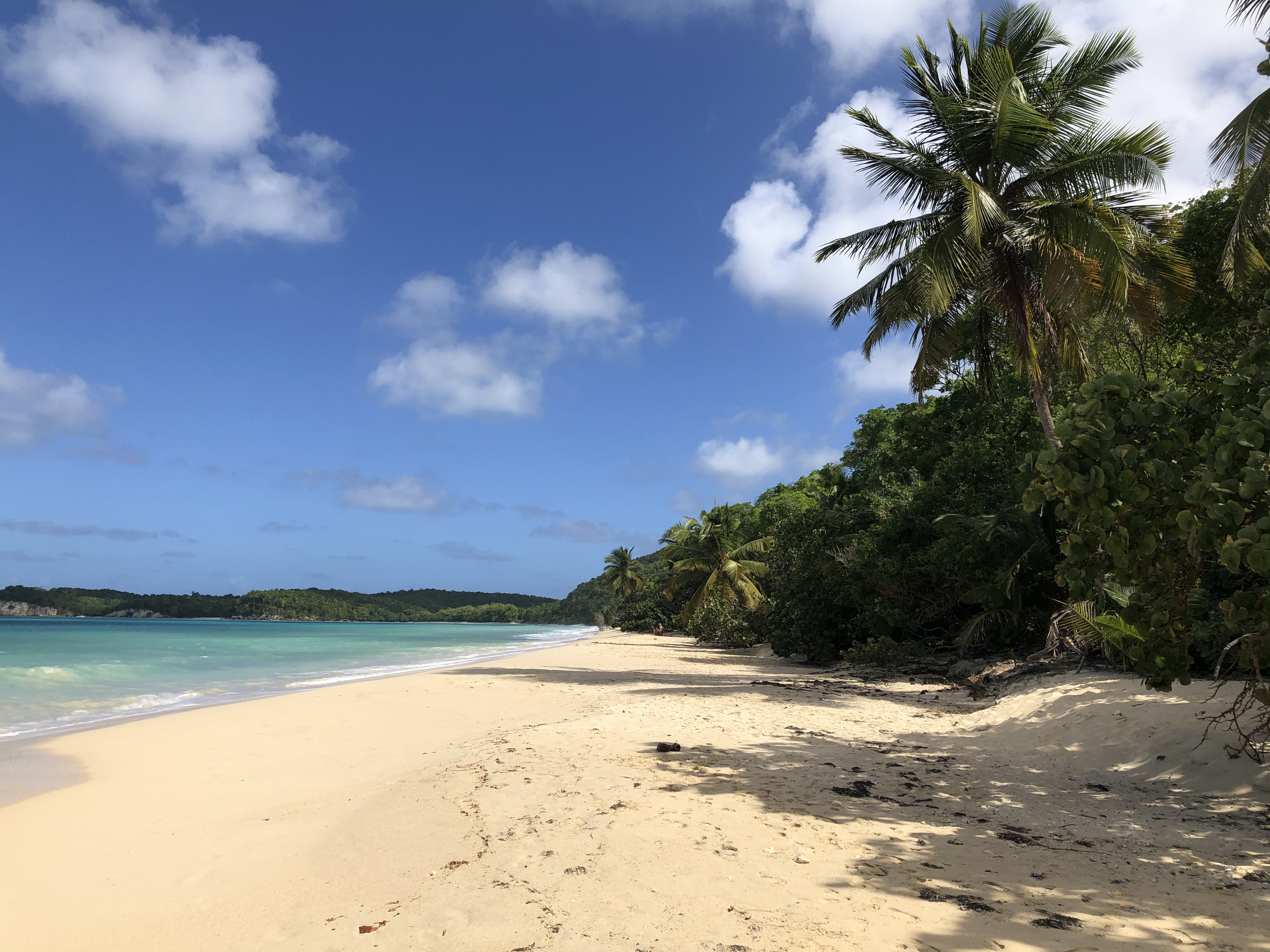
Folle Anse Beach, Marie-Galante

=== Tropical cyclones and storm surges ===
The Caribbean islands are often in the path of tropical hurricanes. Located in a very exposed region, Marie-Galante has to face many cyclones. The island is subject to the passage of hurricanes from May to November. They form locally in the West Indies or off Cape Verde, in Africa, and drift in the easterly trade winds.

The deadliest hurricane to hit Guadeloupe and its islands was the Pointe-à-Pitre hurricane of 1776, which killed at least 6,000 people.12 On September 16, 1989, Hurricane Hugo caused severe damage to the islands of the archipelago. In 1995, three cyclones (Iris, Luis and Marilyn) hit the archipelago in less than three weeks. In September 2017, Marie-Galante faced Hurricane Maria, category 5, 4 deaths in Guadeloupe and sustained winds of up to 215 km/h, much higher gusts in Marie-Galante and Les Saintes.

Since the passage of Hurricane Maria on September 18 in the Lesser Antilles, particularly in Dominica, where the eye of the cyclone passed, the archipelago of Guadeloupe, including "mainland Guadeloupe" and Marie-Galante saw the arrival of a mass exodus from Dominica, Dominiquais coming to take refuge on neighboring islands of their own, destroyed and almost unlivable. The archipelago also suffered the same phenomenon, this time coming from St. Martin, after the passage, from September 6 to 10, of Hurricane Irma, category 5, considered the most powerful hurricane in the North Atlantic since 1980.

Some of the most notable hurricanes to have hit Guadeloupe and the islands of the archipelago in the 20th and 21st centuries include

September 12, 1928: Okeechobee hurricane; August 11, 1956: Hurricane Betsy; October 26, 1963: Tropical Storm Helena; August 22, 1964: Hurricane Cleo, category 3, strong (14 deaths); September 27, 1966: Hurricane Inez; September 16–17, 1989: Hurricane Hugo; September 14–15, 1995: Hurricane Marilyn, September 6, 2017: Hurricane Irma; September 18 and 19, 2017: Hurricane Maria.

== Economy ==
The colonial economy was based on the cultivation of tobacco, indigo, coffee and cotton. But from the 17th century, sugar cane became an important source of income. This continued into the 19th and 20th centuries, adapting to the abolition of the enslavement of Africans and the great sugar crisis.

During the dominance of the sugar cane industry, Marie-Galante acquired the nickname "the island with a hundred mills" (French: lîle aux cent moulins), formerly having over 106 sugar mills. In 1818 there were over one hundred mills to process sugar cane. The cane juice was transformed into sugar or rum. The mills were originally powered by oxen, replaced by windmills from 1780, in turn replaced by steam powered mills from 1883.

The 19th century brought the disappearance of the former economic model. Gradually the small-scale sugar refining was processed in larger factories, by 1885 the five sites controlled the industry. In 1931, eighteen sugar distilleries and four factories were in production. In the 20th century, the large enslaved African plantations were forcibly abolished and gave place to small farms, organized into co-operatives. But agriculture in the French West Indies is subject to global competition and by the beginning of the 21st century, one sugar refinery (usine de Grande-Anse) and three distilleries (Bellevue, Bielle, and Poisson) remained on Marie-Galante. The white rum they produced is subject to an appellation d'origine contrôlée. Organic sugar production could be an innovative development, but the current political situation ended European subsidies putting the current agricultural practices in jeopardy and thus threatens the economic future of Marie-Galante and its inhabitants.

Remnants of the old economy still exist and Marie-Galante's rich history is a tourist attraction: a nature trail with 70 points of interest including two restored windmills (the Bézard Mill and the Bellevue Distillery), colonial dwellings and old sugar refineries (the Murat House and Mill) produces a network of paths for hikers and cyclists to discover the island and its people.

Like the other islands in the region, Marie-Galante has undergone the economic transformation accompanying tourism. But the tourism development is based on a policy of conserving nature and heritage, whether it is pre-Columbian, colonial or contemporary. Marie-Galante Airport is located on Pointe des Basses, halfway between Grand-Bourg and Capesterre making access to the airport difficult.

== Demography ==
Marie-Galante had 25,400 inhabitants in 1930, 30,000 in 1946 and 30,200 in 1953. Due to an exodus of residents going to Guadeloupe and to Metropolitan France, the island's population was reduced to 12,009 inhabitants in the 2006 census. This population decline is related to the decline in the sugar cane economy. By the start of 2018 the population was estimated to be 10,655. The population density in 2018 was 62.5/km^{2} (162/sq mi).

=== Education ===
The territory of Marie-Galante is part of the Academy of Guadeloupe and is included in the Pôle Grande-Terre Nord which includes the districts of Grande-Terre Nord, Sainte-Anne and Saint-François.

The island has

- Several elementary schools, including a private school.
- Three collèges (junior high schools)
- The Lycée Hyacinthe-Bastaraud (high school), which has the particularity of having a preparatory class for the entrance exam to the National Merchant Navy School, a Science-Po workshop and a fishing section

=== Health ===
Marie-Galante has :

- A hospital (Centre Hospitalier Sainte-Marie) located in Grand-Bourg, which no longer has a maternity ward since September 2012
- A clinic located in the same place
- A home hospitalization establishment in May 2017

== Politics and government ==
=== Administrative organization ===
The island of Marie-Galante is composed of 3 municipalities: Capesterre-de-Marie-Galante, Grand-Bourg (head) and Saint-Louis-de-Marie-Galante, grouped into the Community of Communes of Marie-Galante (C.C.M.G) whose headquarters is in the town of Grand-Bourg.

Marie-Galante is currently part of the Pointe-à-Pitre district.

While before the cantonal redistribution of 2014 the island territory was divided into 3 cantons, since 2015 it has only one canton: that of Marie-Galante.

=== Political history ===
Since the beginning of French colonization, Marie-Galante has been administratively attached to the district of Pointe-à-Pitre, except during the revolutionary period of 1793–1794. And during this short period, while the rest of the Guadeloupe archipelago remained monarchical, this territory was republican.

=== Marie-Galante Country ===
The term Country (Pays in French) is sometimes used to designate the typical and traditional characters that have developed in the territory of Marie-Galante.

Being designated as a country, according to the terms of the Community of Communes of Marie-Galante, should "allow a better definition and affirmation of the uniqueness and specificity of the territory of Marie-Galante, as well as its ethnocultural diversity".

== Transport ==
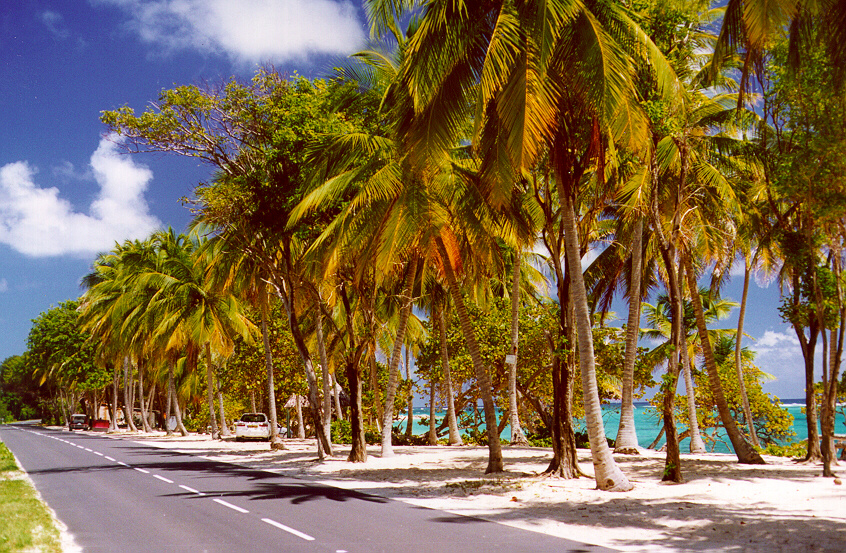
Road and palm trees in Marie Galante

The island has an airfield that is served by one airline. The connection with the islands of Guadeloupe, Dominica, Martinique and other islands of the Lesser Antilles is made by boat.

In 2017, two major competing companies each run about three daily rotations between the seaports of Grand-Bourg, Saint-Louis and the seaport of Bergevin in Pointe-à-Pitre: Valferry and Island Express. Other services are available from Saint-Louis. The crossing takes about one hour.

Barges from the autonomous port of Pointe-à-Pitre and other vessels allow the daily transport of goods from the seaport of Folle Anse, which conducts its transatlantic trade with mainland France and the rest of Europe, as well as with other parts of America, including through the port of Pointe-à-Pitre and Jarry.

On the island, all common vehicles are allowed. A service of several buses connects daily the three municipalities. There are several cabs and numerous vehicle rental companies (cars and scooters).

== Energy ==
The municipality of Saint-Louis has a subsidiary of the Pointe-à-Pitre Chamber of Commerce and Industry, and is developing an experimental photovoltaic plant project.

A wind farm is installed in the locality of Capesterre, on the site of morne Constant - the place of the island most exposed to prevailing winds - and participates in the objective of energy independence of the island (mainly against fossil fuels) as part of the development of Guadeloupe's electricity system. It consists of twenty-three two-bladed retractable wind turbines with a total installed power of 1,380 kW operated by the company Quadran 5.

While in 2017 more than two thirds of the electricity consumed on the island is produced by fossil fuel power plants in Guadeloupe and imported by a submarine cable, the elected officials of Marie-Galante have developed an energy autonomy project based on 100% local renewable energies combined with an energy sobriety model and the use of electric vehicles.

A 7.5 MW biomass power plant will be built, fueled by bagasse (residue from sugar cane crushing) and household waste. It will be complemented by 4 MW of photovoltaic and wind power and an electricity storage facility. In terms of mobility, electric vehicles and charging stations will be deployed. Energy production and consumption will be managed by a virtual power plant and a smart grid.

== Sport ==
The Grand-Bourg municipal stadium is used for training and matches by the US Grand-Bourg soccer club. Cycling is represented by the Union vélocipédique marie-galantaise (UVMG).

The Saint-Louis de Marie-Galante municipal stadium hosts the training and matches of the Saint-Louis Athlétic Club (SLAC). Since January 2020, a three-day jet ski stage race, created by Eric Paulin, organizer of the "Karujet", has been held on the Saint-Louis waterfront.

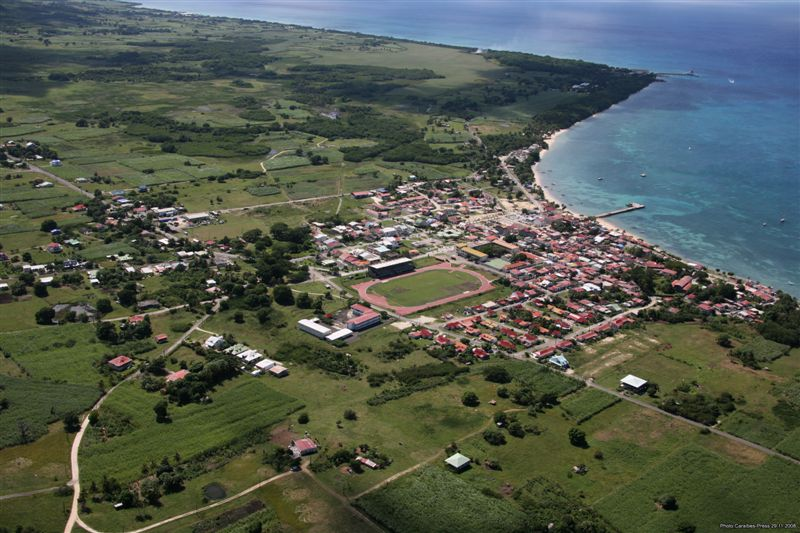
View of Saint-Louis de Marie-Galante and its stadium

In addition, the city of Capesterre, after 10 long years of work, inaugurated on July 30 its stadium called Stade José Bade, with a capacity of at least 1,200 seats. It hosts the training sessions and matches of two soccer clubs:

- Club Amical de Marie-Galante
- Jeunesse-Sportive de Capesterre

=== Sports groups and associations ===
- UVMG (Union Vélocipédique marie-galantaise)
- Amical Club de Marie-Galante, soccer club
- JSC (Jeunesse-Sportive de Capesterre), soccer club
- USGB (Union Sportive de Grand-Bourg), soccer club
- CMGVB (Comité de Marie-Galante du Volley Ball), volleyball club. Leslie Turiaf is a notable volleyball player from Marie-Galante.

=== Sporting events ===
- The Tour of Marie-Galante Cycling Tour.
- The Karujet - World Jet Ski Championship in Petit-Bourg, including Marie-Galante.

== Culture ==
=== Cuisine ===
Marie-Galante's traditional dish is known as bébélé. The kilibibi is a delicacy native to the island. The caca-bœuf is a type of pastry also consumed in the region.

=== Festivities ===
At Christmas, families and friends gather at the chanté nowel and the Christmas Market, organized all over Marie-Galante.

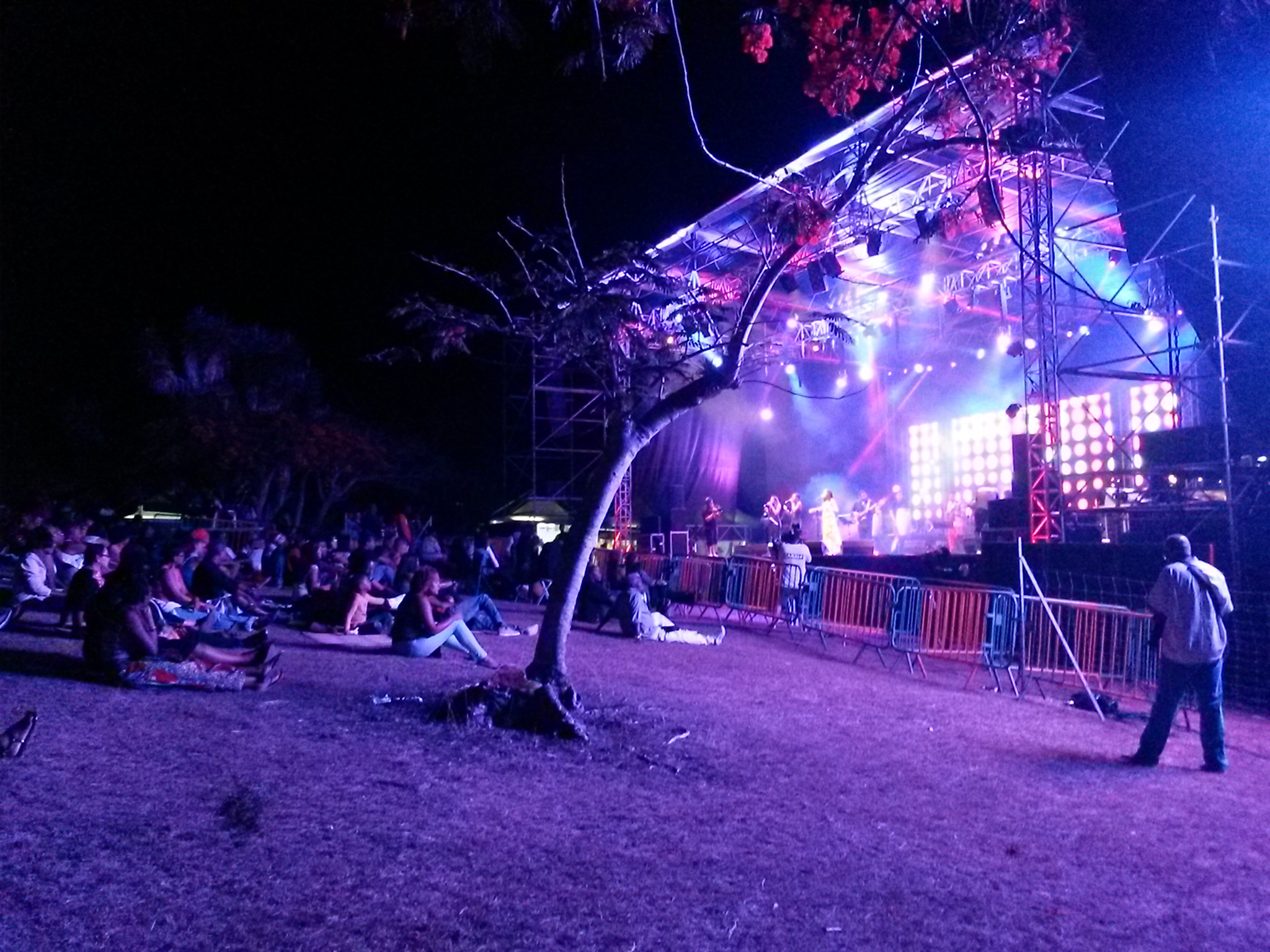
Terre de Blues Festival

Carnival troupes parade every Sunday afternoon through the streets, from January until the carnival festivities in February or March. Every year, at the end of January, a big carnival parade is organized in the main city, Grand-Bourg since 2013, called WOY MI MASS. It gathers about 9,000 to 10,000 people each year and has several carnival groups (with "Po", "Ti Mass" and drums) which almost all participate in a contest for the best costumes, the best music or the best choreography whose theme is imposed by the carnival committees, on a red carpet in front of a podium under the gaze of spectators and filmed live.

There is also the Carnival in kabwèt of Marie-Galante, Saint-Louis, a practice that mixes the French tradition of fat oxen and the tradition of Carnival parades. It is an important moment for the safeguarding and promotion of the traditions of Marie-Galante and Guadeloupe. The parade consists of about thirty decorated wagons pulled by a couple of oxen, along 22 km in the countryside and in Saint-Louis de Marie-Galante. And since 2014, this carnival of Marie-Galante has been inscribed on the inventory of the intangible heritage of France by Unesco.

The Mardi Gras is the big festival in which carnival groups compete in one of the towns of Marie-Galante depending on the year. Then the next day, on Ash Wednesday, the day that ends the carnival, the mascot of the carnival king, nicknamed Vaval, is burned, marking the end of the festivities, everyone parades in black and white (to mark Vaval's mourning), and then the 40 days of Lent begin.

Most of the population is Catholic and respects this period. As a sign of respect people do not go to discos, avoid partying, and some only eat fish while others don't eat fish at all. But, given the celebrations, on "Thursday of Lent" a parade is organized in red and black identical to that of the carnival, with groups of musicians preceded by people parading.

After this period of deprivation, the Easter celebrations take place, during which families often go camping on the beach and eat crab-based dishes: matété (rice cooked with crab), calalou (crabs with Madeira leaves accompanied by white rice) or dombrés aux crabes (flour dumplings cooked with crab). At this time, there are many ox-dragging competitions in which the ox is more than just an agricultural tool.

At Pentecost, the biggest festival in Marie-Galante and one of the biggest in the Caribbean, the Terre de Blues festival, a music festival that welcomes between 13,000 and 15,000 festival-goers each year, is held every year.

In August, the patronal feast of Grand-Bourg is celebrated, one of the largest patronal feasts in Guadeloupe. Apart from the patronal feasts of Capesterre and Saint-Louis, Grand-Bourg is the largest and most important of Marie-Galante. Generally, in mid-August, it welcomes about 15 000 spectators in one day.

October 28 is celebrated as International Creole Day.

The young people of Marie-Galante, concerned about their cultural heritage, have created a new trend called Galanta, derived from Marie-Galante, which young people give to the island. This expression is often found in their music or in graffiti on some old buildings, streets or T-shirts with the effigy of the island.

== People ==
- Constant d'Aubigné (1585–1647) was governor of Marie-Galante, accompanied by his daughter, Francoise d'Aubigné. Several years later she became Mardame de Maintenon, secret second wife of Louis XIV of France. Due to her time in the West Indies she was known by the nickname "Beautiful Indian".
