= Management International Review =

- Discipline: Economy, international management
- Language: English
- Edited by: Joachim Wolf, Michael-Jörg Oesterle

Publication details
- Publisher: Springer-Verlag (Germany)
- Frequency: Bimonthly

Standard abbreviations
- ISO 4: Manag. Int. Rev.

Indexing
- ISSN: 0938-8249

Links
- Journal homepage

Management International Review (MIR) is a business and management journal dealing with aspects of international management. Founded in 1960, MIR published its 50th volume in 2010. As of 2020, MIR's impact factor was 3.721 and its Google H-Index (as of July 2020) was 57. It is published by Springer-Verlag (formerly Gabler).

Since 1960 there have been between four and eight issues per volume, and between six and eight articles per issue. MIR normally publishes six issues a year, often including select focused issues (called special issues before 2005) focusing on a single aspect of international management.

Klaus Macharzina served as editor in chief for twenty-five years (1980-2005) and has since been honorary editor. In 2005, his former PhD candidates Joachim Wolf and Michael-Jörg Oesterle succeeded him as editors in chief. From 2005 to 2008, MIR's editorial office was at Kiel University. Since 2008, it has been at University of Mainz. It rotates every three years.
