= Transport in Guadeloupe =

As an archipelago, Guadeloupe depends on several systems of public transport. The two islands that make up Guadeloupe proper - Grande-Terre and Basse-Terre - have an extensive road network, while water and air transportation connects to the outer islands as well as international destinations.

== Road transport ==
Guadeloupe uses right-hand traffic. Of the 2,082 km of roads in the region, the majority (1,742 km) are paved and are well-maintained. As Guadeloupe is a French-administered territory, road signs and directions are written in French. The two main islands of Grande-Terre and Basse-Terre are connected by the N1 and N11 highways. Winding roads are common, and in Basse-Terre, the mountain roads have especially sharp turns.

Karu'lis operates several bus routes across Grande-Terre (including direct services to and around Basse-Terre), and a small route runs on the north-eastern island of La Désirade.

== Rail transport ==
There are no public railways in Guadeloupe. A public railway line between Pointe-à-Pitre and Le Moule (Grande-Terre) was proposed but was later scrapped. Some plantations operate private railways. There exists a tourist railway that is operational (as of 2014) from Beauport, Port Louis to de Poyen. The construction of a tramway was planned with two lines: one between the Abymes and the Memorial in Pointe-à-Pître; the other between Baie-Mahault and Gosier. This project was later abandoned due to High-service buses being preferred over the tramway.

== Water transport ==
The container terminal Port de Jarry, in Pointe-à-Pitre, is Guadeloupe's primary port for cargo and cruise ship passengers. It handles more than 95% of Guadeloupe's trade. Basse-Terre city contains a smaller sea port which also handles passengers.

Ferries connect Guadeloupe proper to the outer islands of La Désirade, Marie-Galante, and Îles des Saintes, as well as other Caribbean ports.

== Air transport ==
Pointe-à-Pitre International Airport is the primary gateway for international travel into and out of Guadeloupe. It offers direct and chartered/seasonal flights to South America, the Caribbean, North America and Europe. It is a hub airport for Air Caraïbes.
