= Development history of the Silverstone Circuit =

History of British motor racing circuit

Coordinates: 52.07321°N 1.01437°W

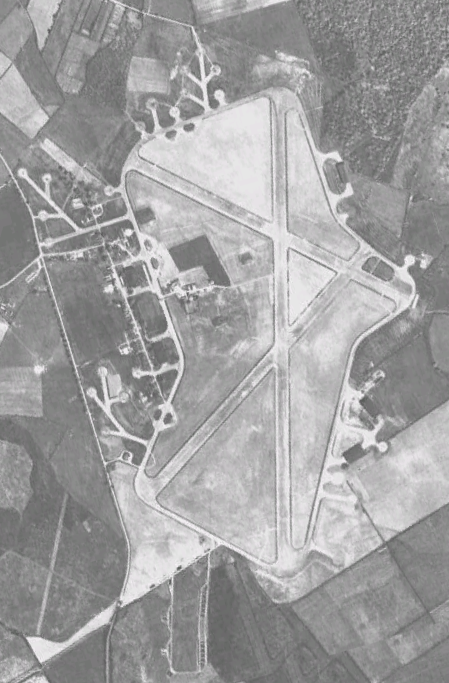
Aerial view of RAF Silverstone in 1945

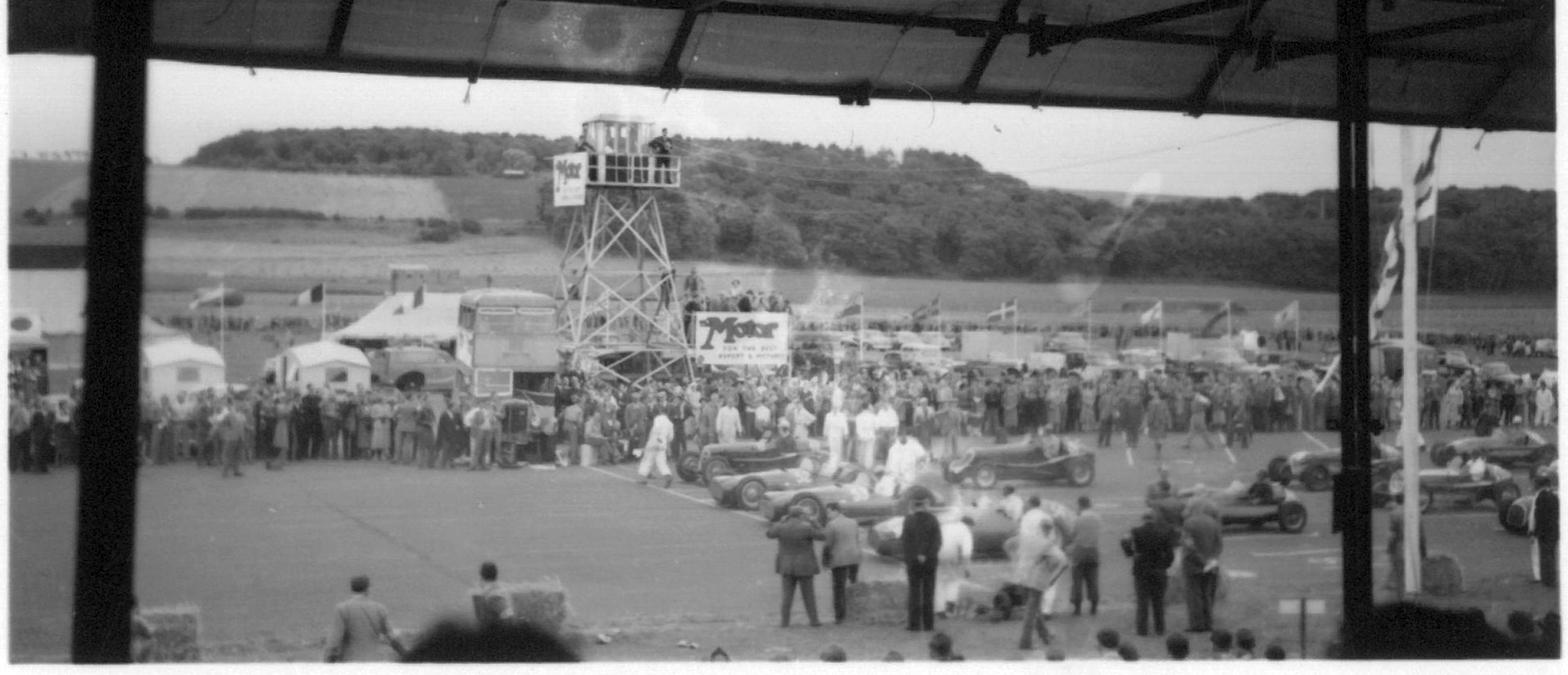
Photo from Grandstand in 1952

The Silverstone Circuit is built on the site of a World War II Royal Air Force bomber station, RAF Silverstone, which opened in 1943. The airfield's three runways, in classic WWII triangle format, lay within the outline of the present track. Since its first use in the 1940s, the circuit has undergone several changes.

== History ==
Silverstone Circuit was first used for motorsport by an ad hoc group of friends who set up an impromptu race in September 1947. One of their members, Maurice Geoghegan, lived in nearby Silverstone village and was aware that the airfield was deserted. He and eleven other drivers raced over a two mile circuit, during the course of which Geoghegan himself ran over a sheep that had wandered onto the airfield. The sheep was killed and the car written off, and in the aftermath of this event the informal race became known as the Mutton Grand Prix.

The next year the Royal Automobile Club took a lease on the airfield and set out a more formal racing circuit. Their first two races were held on the runways themselves, with long straights separated by tight hairpin corners, the track demarcated by hay bales. However, for the 1949 International Trophy meeting, it was decided to switch to the perimeter track. This arrangement was used for the 1950 and 1951 Grands Prix. In 1952 the start line was moved from the Farm Straight to the straight linking Woodcote and Copse corners, and this layout remained largely unaltered for the following 38 years. For the 1975 meeting a chicane was introduced to try to tame speeds through the mighty Woodcote Corner (although MotoGP would still use the circuit without the chicane up until 1986). In 1987 Luffield a left right corner was added.

The track underwent a major redesign between the 1990 and 1991 races, transforming the ultra-fast track (where in its last years, every corner was taken in no lower than 4th or 5th gear – depending on the transmission of the car – except for the Bridge chicane, which was usually taken in 2nd gear) into a more technical track. The Maggotts, Becketts and Chapel corners were modified into a challenging and deeply rapid left-right-left-right-left sequence with Becketts being altered to create this section. A bridge was added to the hangar straight. Vale was added between Stowe and Club to entice overtaking and new section of Bridge (named after the bridge which went across the track), Priory, Brooklands (named after the motor racing circuit), and a changed Luffield corners was added after Abbey.

Following the deaths of Senna and fellow Grand Prix driver Roland Ratzenberger at Imola in 1994, many Grand Prix circuits were modified in order to reduce speed and increase driver safety. As a consequence of this, Copse, Stowe, Abbey and Priory corners were all re-profiled to be slower with increased run off. A chicane at Abbey was added for 1994 after Pedro Lamy's Lotus car ended up in the pedestrian tunnel that passed under the bridge that preceded Bridge corner during testing. In 1997 many corners were again re-profiled, but this time to increase the speed and flow of the circuit.

== Recent developments ==
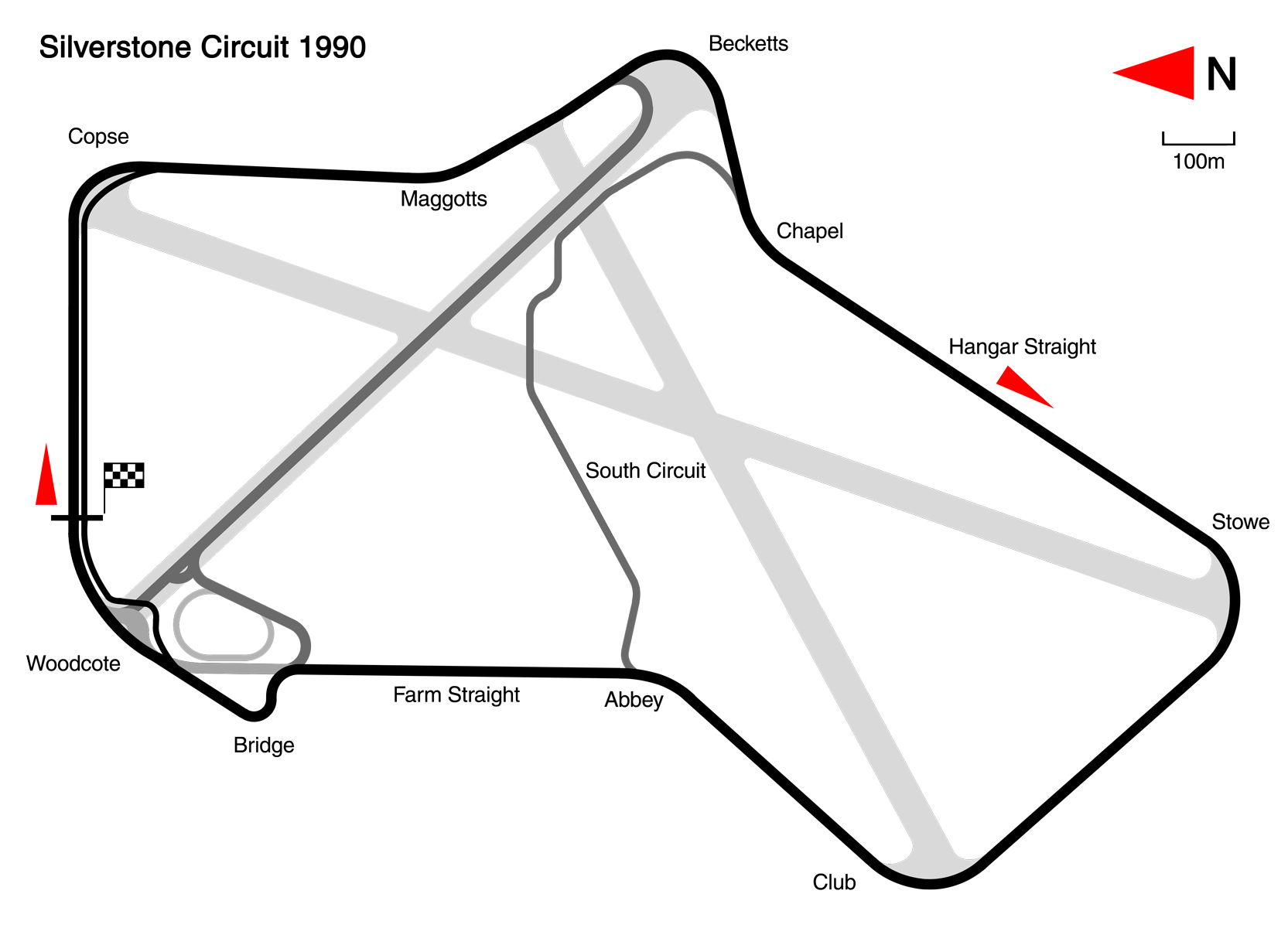
Silverstone prior to 1991

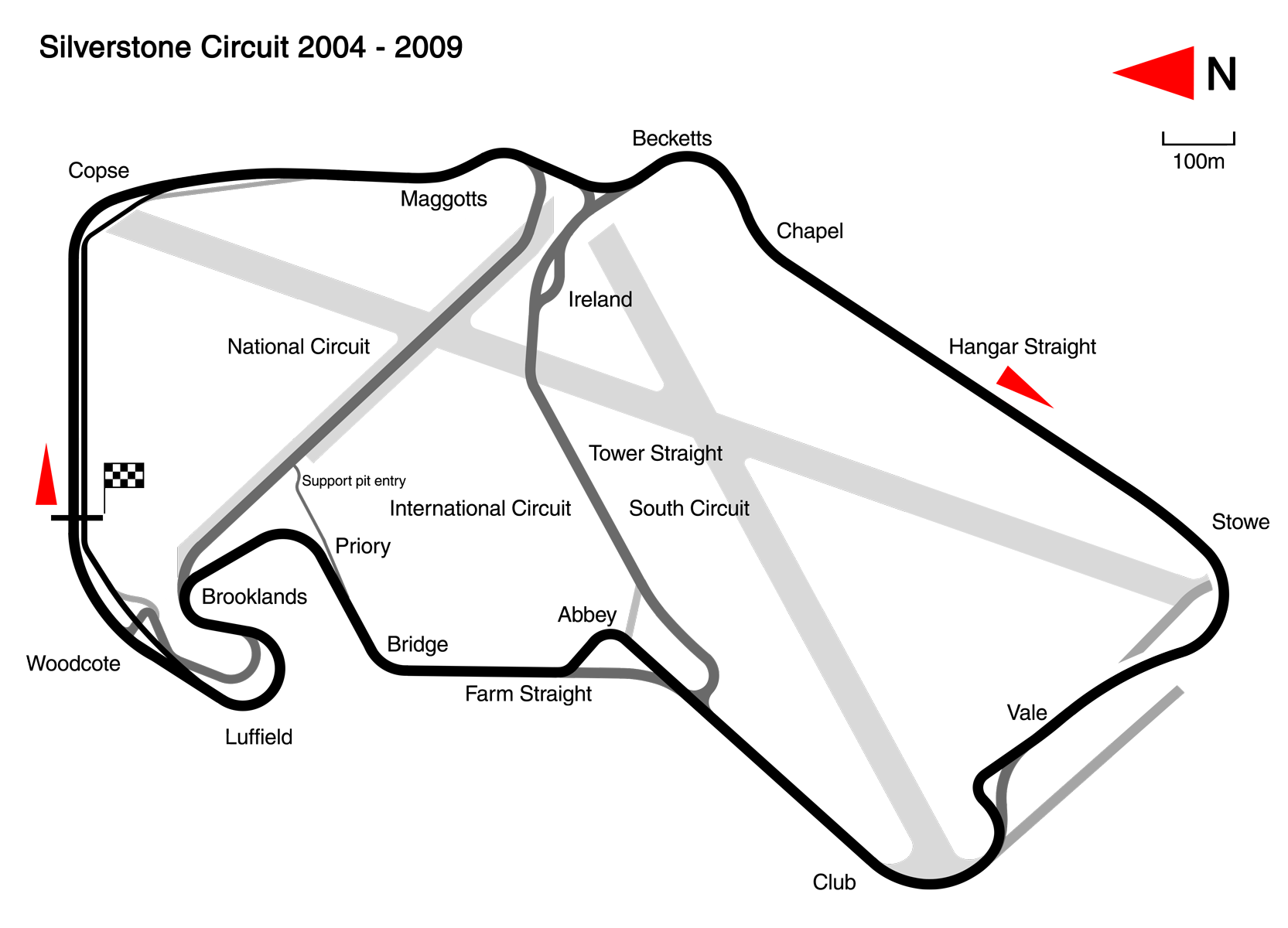
Silverstone prior to 2010

Bernie Ecclestone stated that he would negotiate the future of Formula One at Silverstone post-2009 only if the BRDC gave up its role as promoter of the event. In an Autosport interview he said "I want to deal with a promoter rather than the BRDC. It is too difficult with the BRDC because you get no guarantees with them. We've said that unless they can get the circuit to the level expected from so-called third-world countries we are not prepared to do a deal. They know what we want them to build." A new pit-and-paddock complex is the minimum redevelopment required. Maurice Hamilton has described the attitude of the BRDC as "[appearing to be] inflexible and sometimes arrogant". During testing ahead of the British Grand Prix, Damon Hill likened the relationship between the BRDC and governing body as that of Aladdin's Cave: "The genie says give me the lamp and Aladdin says get me out of the cave and I’ll give you the lamp. You’re in this constant cycle whereby in order to get our plans implemented we need to have a Grand Prix contract, and in order to get the Grand Prix contract we have to have our planning."

On 1 August 2007 it was announced that a £25m redevelopment of the circuit had been approved, with new grandstands, pit facilities and a development centre planned. However, on 4 July 2008 it was announced that the event would move to Donington Park from 2010.

On 12 January 2009 it was announced that Silverstone would host the British MotoGP from 2010 after signing a five-year deal to hold this event.

On 18 February 2009, the first pictures of the MotoGP Layout emerged (this has since changed to the layout that was constructed). The track is slightly longer than the Grand Prix circuit, as it uses parts of the three main configurations at Silverstone – the Grand Prix circuit from the start-finish to Abbey corner, then turns right to go up part of the International layout in reverse, before joining the National Circuit's straight from a left-hand hairpin known as the Arrowhead. Having negotiated the straight, the bikes rejoin the Grand Prix circuit at Brooklands.

On 20 June 2009 Bernie Ecclestone stated that there would be a British Grand Prix at Silverstone in 2010 if Donington was not ready to host it. When asked why he had moved from his previous "Donington or nothing" standpoint he cited changes in the structure of the BRDC meaning there was a better way of negotiating with them over future commercial rights. Furthermore during an interview with the BBC about the Formula One Teams Association threatening to break away and form their own series, FIA president Max Mosley said it was "highly likely" the 2010 British Grand Prix would return to Silverstone. On 24 October 2009, BBC News reported that Donington had failed to raise the £135 million needed to stage a British Grand Prix, that Donington's bid 'looks over' and that Bernie Ecclestone had offered the race to Silverstone, but that the terms appeared to be the same as those that the Circuit rejected the first time around.

On 7 December 2009, Silverstone was awarded the rights to host the British Grand Prix for the next 17 years. Part of the deal was for a new pit lane to be built.

The British Grand Prix started to use the Arena circuit configuration since 2010, thus increasing the track's length by 759 metres. Ahead of the 2011 Grand Prix, a new pit complex was completed, making the straight between Club and Abbey corners the new pit straight.

The British Racing Drivers' Club (BRDC) agreed to a 999-year lease of the Silverstone business park and development land around the outside of the Formula One circuit with property developer MEPC. MEPC has paid 32 million pounds for a long-term lease. This payment has allowed the BRDC to pay off its long and short-term loans from Lloyds Banking Group and Northamptonshire County Council

== 2010 redevelopment ==
To make room on Donington Park's calendar for the switch of the Formula One and MotoGP British Grands Prix, it was announced in early 2009 that in return, Silverstone would get the option to host MotoGP in 2010 onwards.

Both the FIM and Silverstone acknowledged a need for the circuit to be remodelled in order to become more suitable for motorcycle racing, with particular concerns raised by riders over the proximity of the bridge at Bridge corner.

A £5 million renovation plan was put forward in February 2009. The most notable change of the remodelling is the addition of a new "Arena" section that sees racers turn right at the old Abbey Chicane and head towards the new Arena section in what was then the infield, turning left onto the National Circuit straight and then rejoining the original Grand Prix circuit at Brooklands. The new 'Arena' consists of three new grandstands. Silverstone later claimed that the changes would make the circuit the fastest track on the MotoGP calendar. This additional section was also used from the 2010 Formula 1 British Grand Prix. From the 2011 Formula 1 British Grand Prix onwards, the start/finish straight and pit building was moved from between Woodcote and Copse, to between Club and Abbey. The straight was renamed the Hamilton Straight on 12 December 2020, after Lewis Hamilton on the achievement of his seventh world title.

Silverstone hosted the British round of the 2010 Superbike World Championship season, taking over from Donington Park after the circuit was deemed "un-raceable" due to the postponed construction that had commenced in 2009.

The bridge section was turned into a Wall of fame.

In September 2013, Silverstone University Technical College, a school specialising in motorsports engineering, event management and hospitality, opened at the circuit.

== Spectator traffic management ==
Historically Silverstone has suffered traffic congestion on race days. This problem has been largely eliminated with the completion of the A43 Silverstone bypass, a dual-carriageway road just to the north of the circuit. When the race was moved to an April date in 2000, rainy conditions turned the fields used for car parking into mud baths, causing chaos for spectators trying to park. On F1 race day in 1999 there were some 4200 helicopter journeys made to Silverstone Heliport, which was the busiest airport in the UK on that day.

== Current circuit configurations ==
Like many racing circuits around the world, the Silverstone Circuit has a number of different layouts which offer differing lengths and complexity.

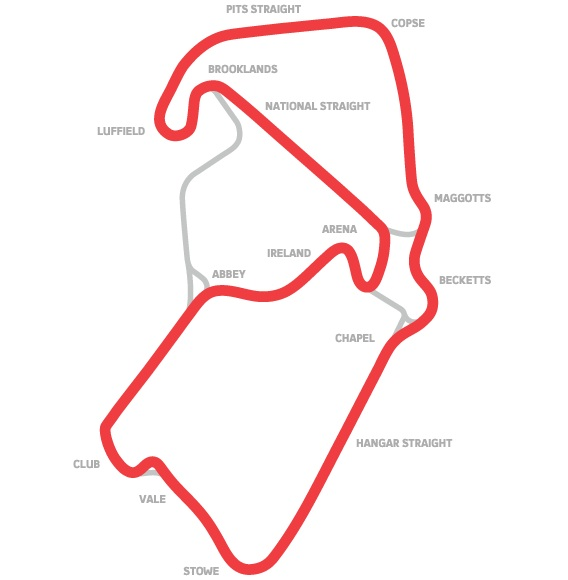
New Grand Prix Circuit: Length: 3.661 miles. Also known as the 'Arena Layout'. Took over as the primary circuit from 2010. Used for the British Grand Prix and MotoGP from 2010 onwards.

Motorcycle Grand Prix Circuit: Length: 3.666 miles. Used for the British motorcycle Grand Prix from 2010 onwards, and World Superbike in 2010–2013. In 2011–2012, international pits were also used for motorcycle races.

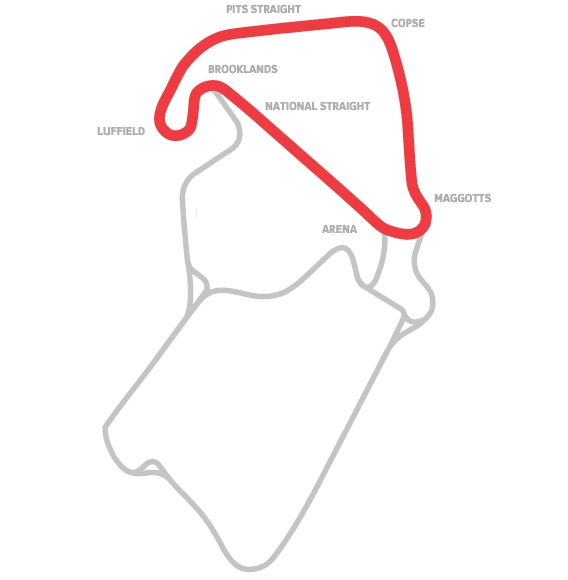
National Circuit: Length: 1.640 miles. Used by the British Superbike Championship since 2018.

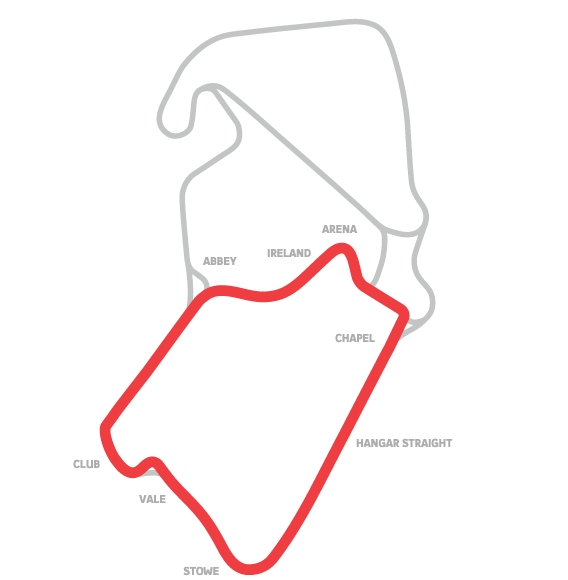
International Circuit: Length: 1.851 miles. Previously known as 'South Circuit'.

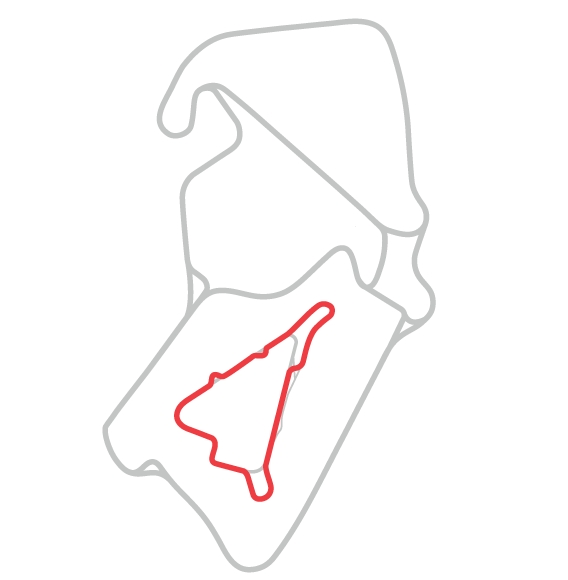
Stowe Circuit: Length: 1.080 miles.

Silverstone World Rallycross layout

== Previous configurations ==
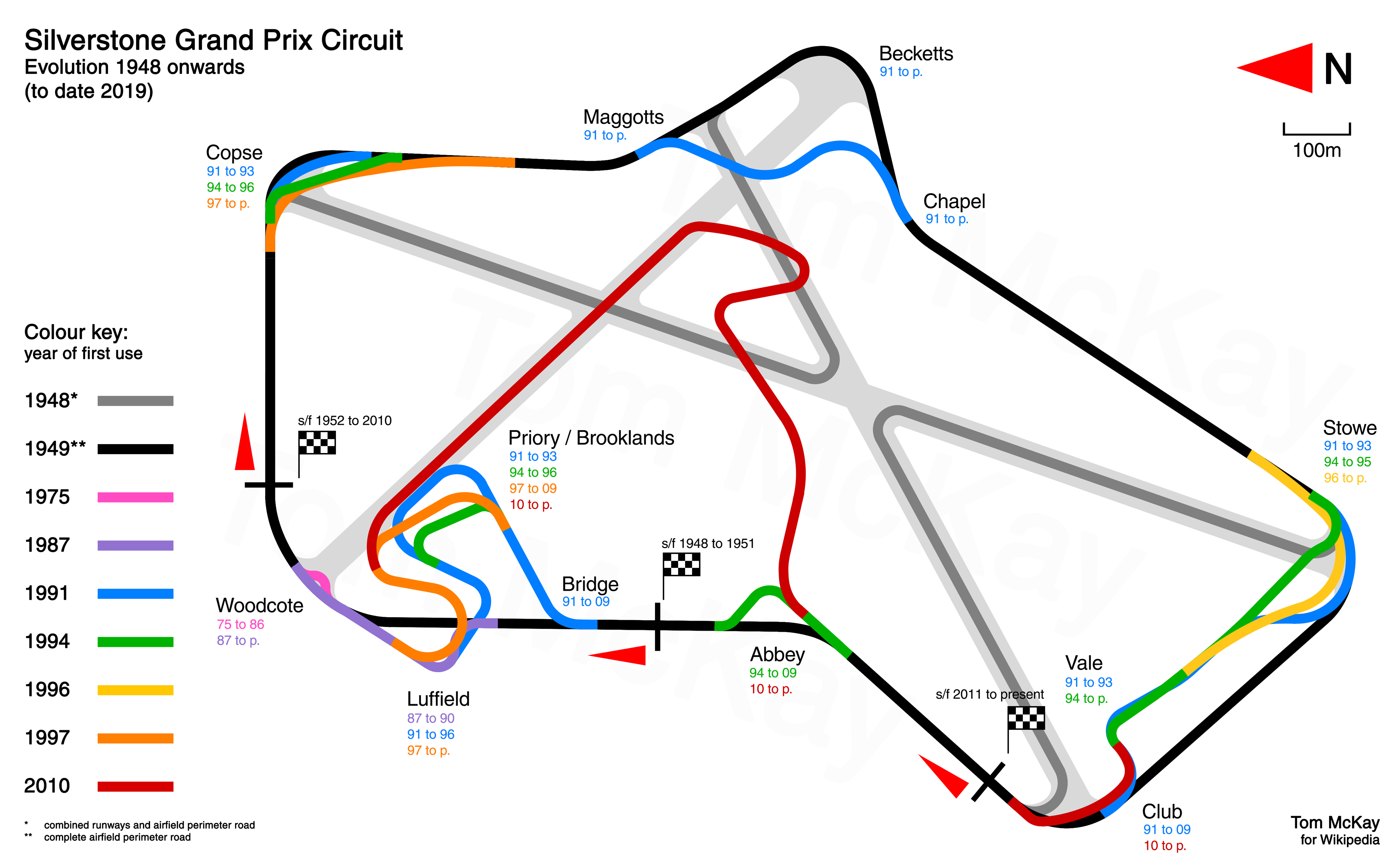
Diagram showing the changes made to the Grand Prix Circuit from 1949 to present.

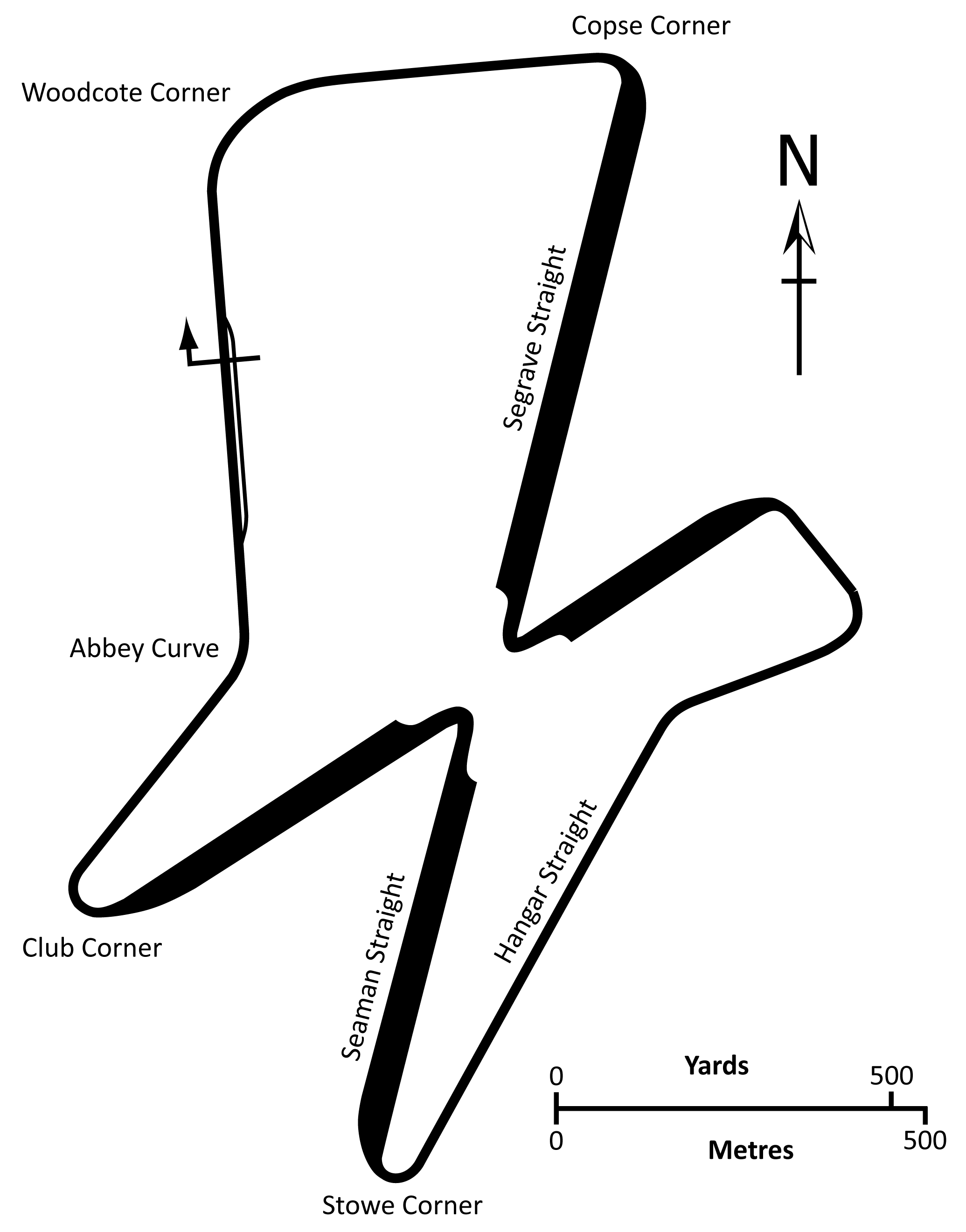
The original 1948 circuit, utilising the main and second runways. Lap record: Luigi Villoresi, Maserati, 2:52.0 (1948 British Grand Prix).

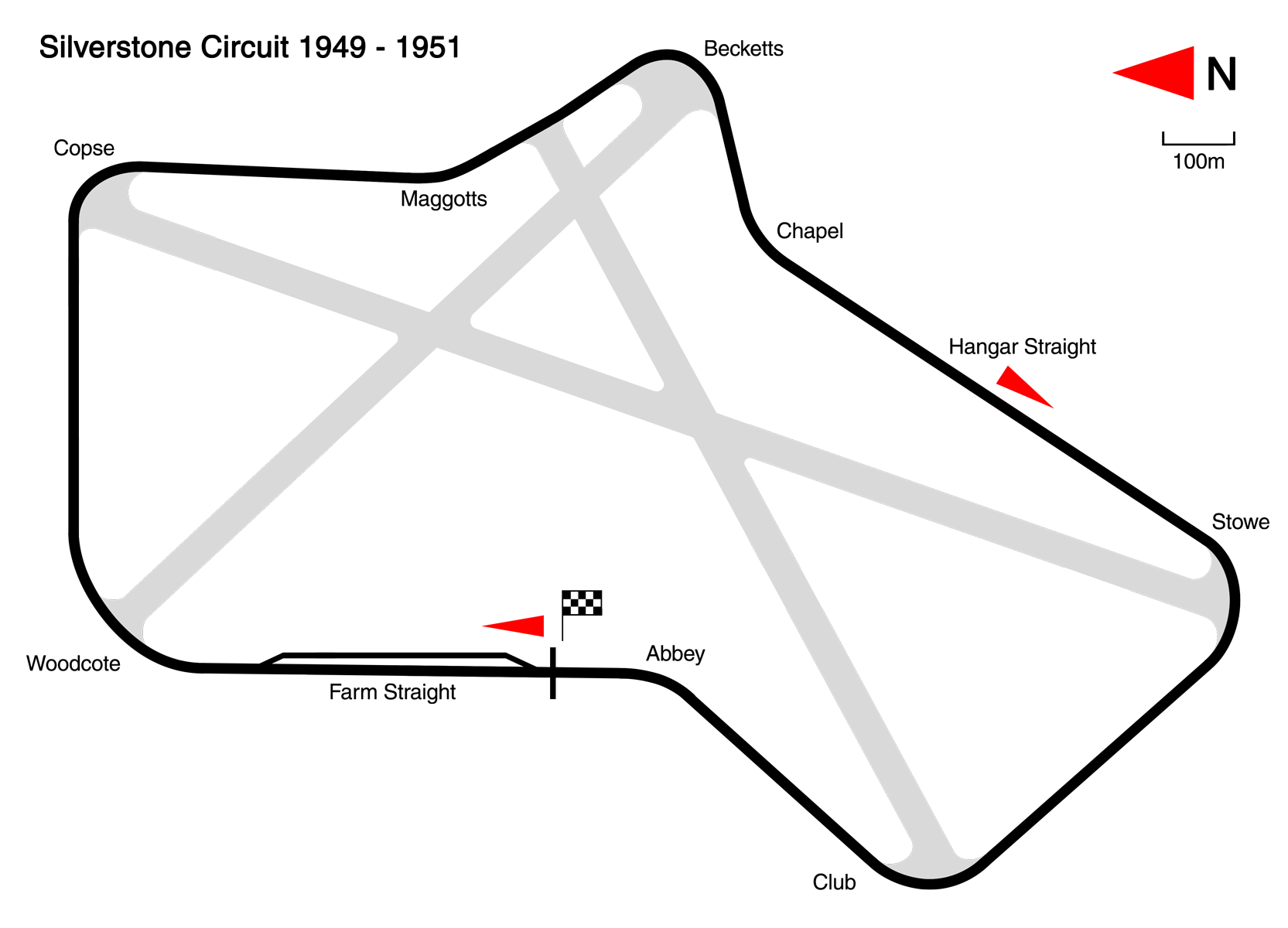
1949 to 1951: The circuit was now run on the airfield perimeter roads. Track length: 4.649 km. Lap record: José Froilán González, Ferrari, 1:43.4 (1951 British Grand Prix).

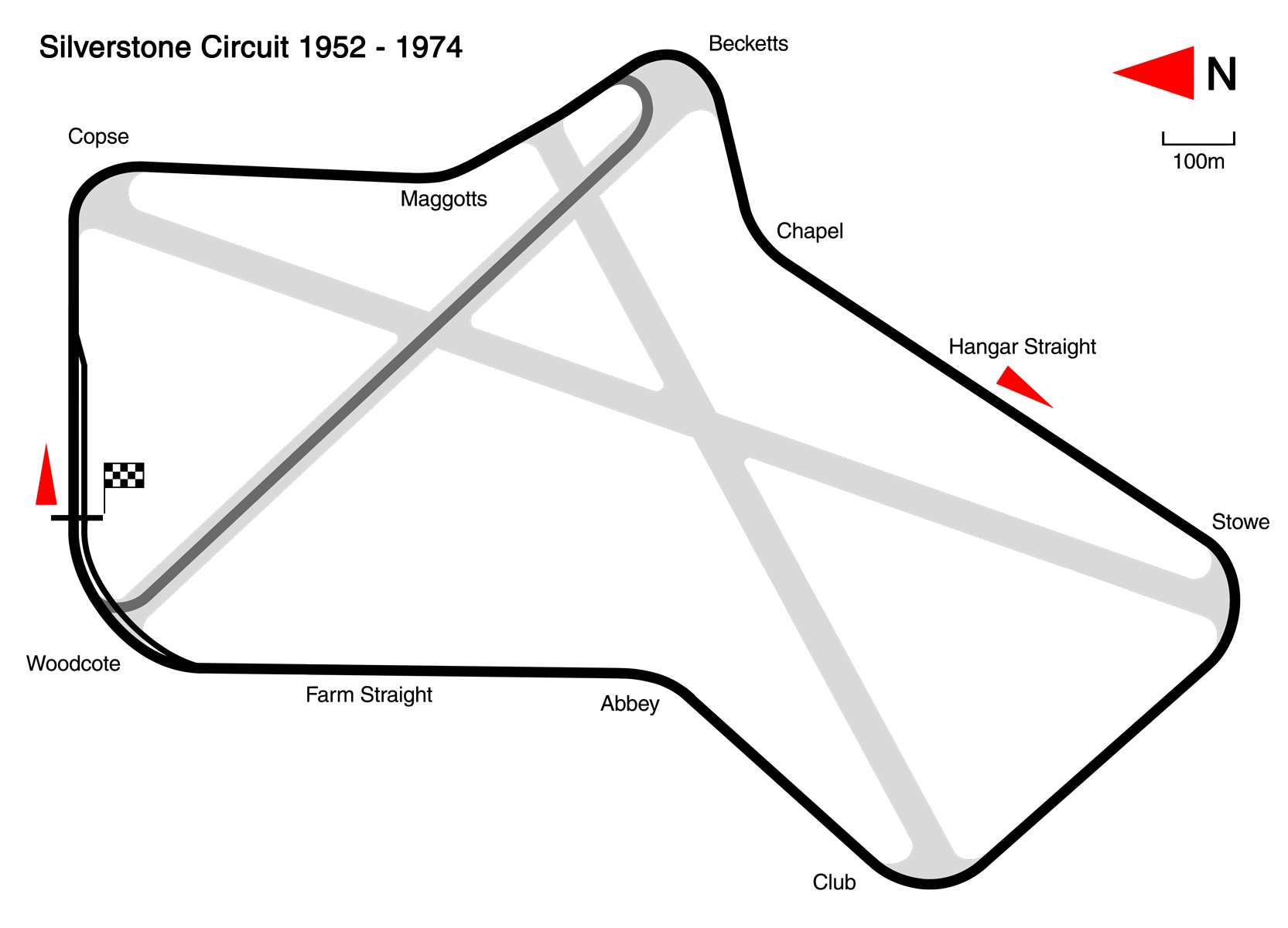
1952 to 1974: following the relocation of the pits area. Track length: 4.711 km. Lap record: Ronnie Peterson, Lotus-Ford, 1:16.3 (1973 British Grand Prix). This configuration was used by Grand Prix motorcycle racing until 1986.

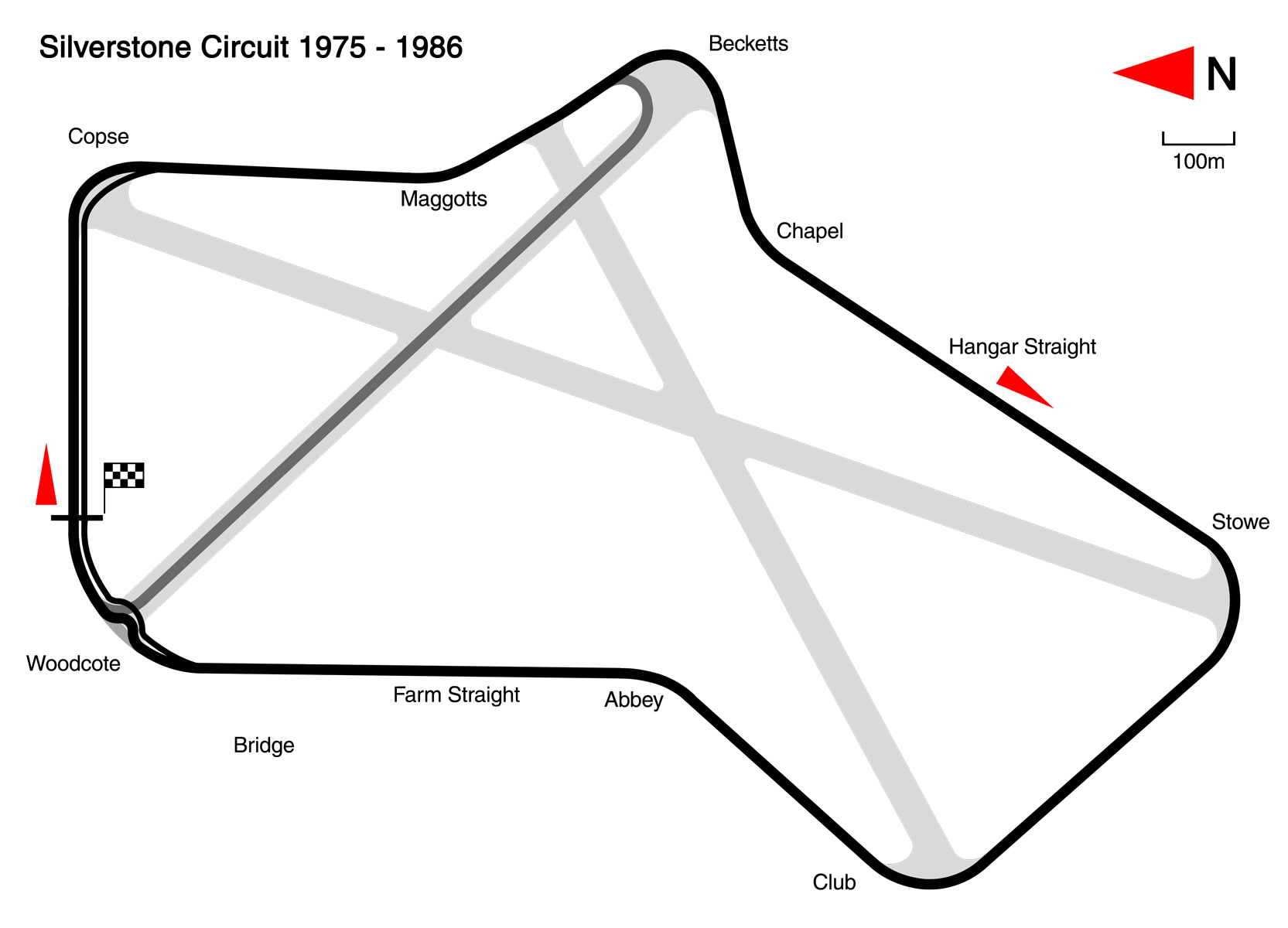
1975 to 1986: with the Woodcote Chicane in place to reduce speeds through Woodcote Corner. Track length: 4.718 km. Lap record: Keke Rosberg, Williams-Honda, 1:05.591 (1985 British Grand Prix).

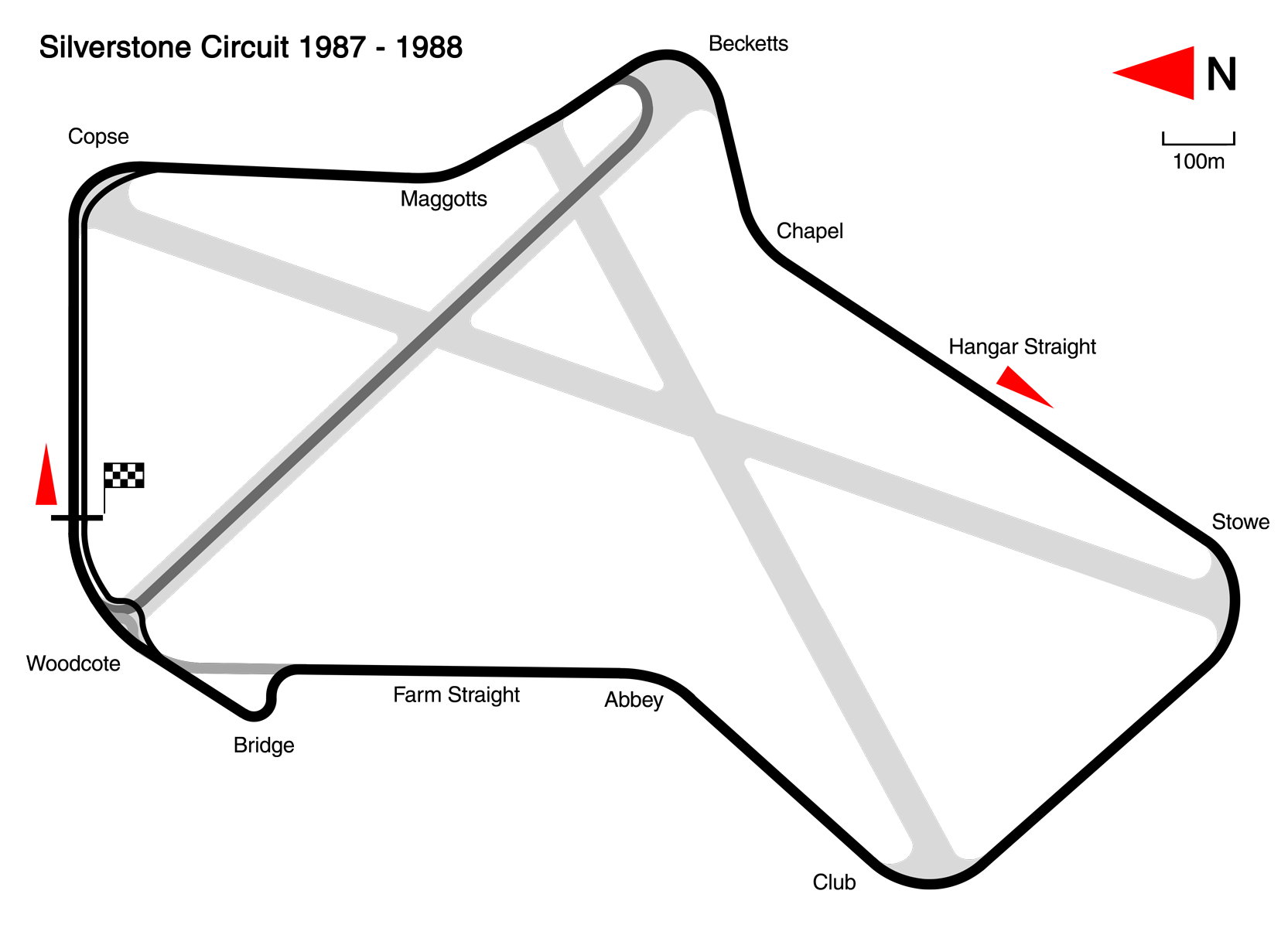
1987 to 1988: with the Bridge Chicane in place to reduce speeds through Woodcote Corner. Track length: 4.778 km. Lap record: Nelson Piquet, Williams-Honda, 1:07.110 (1987 British Grand Prix).

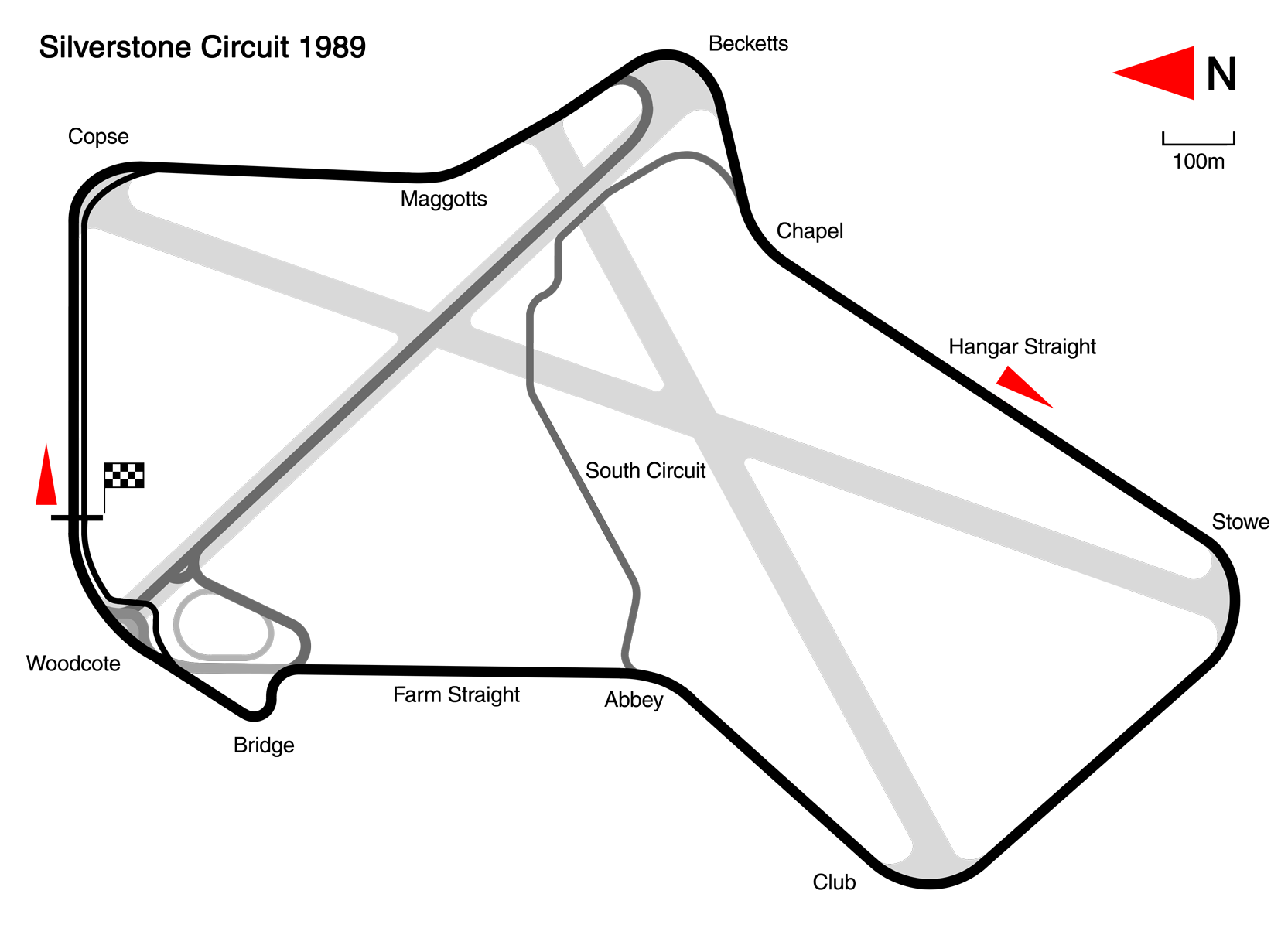
1989: The National Circuit was created by the addition of Brooklands and a short straight connecting to the Bridge chicane. The South Circuit was also constructed in 1989 and used for testing. An oval track was also built between Brooklands and Woodcote.

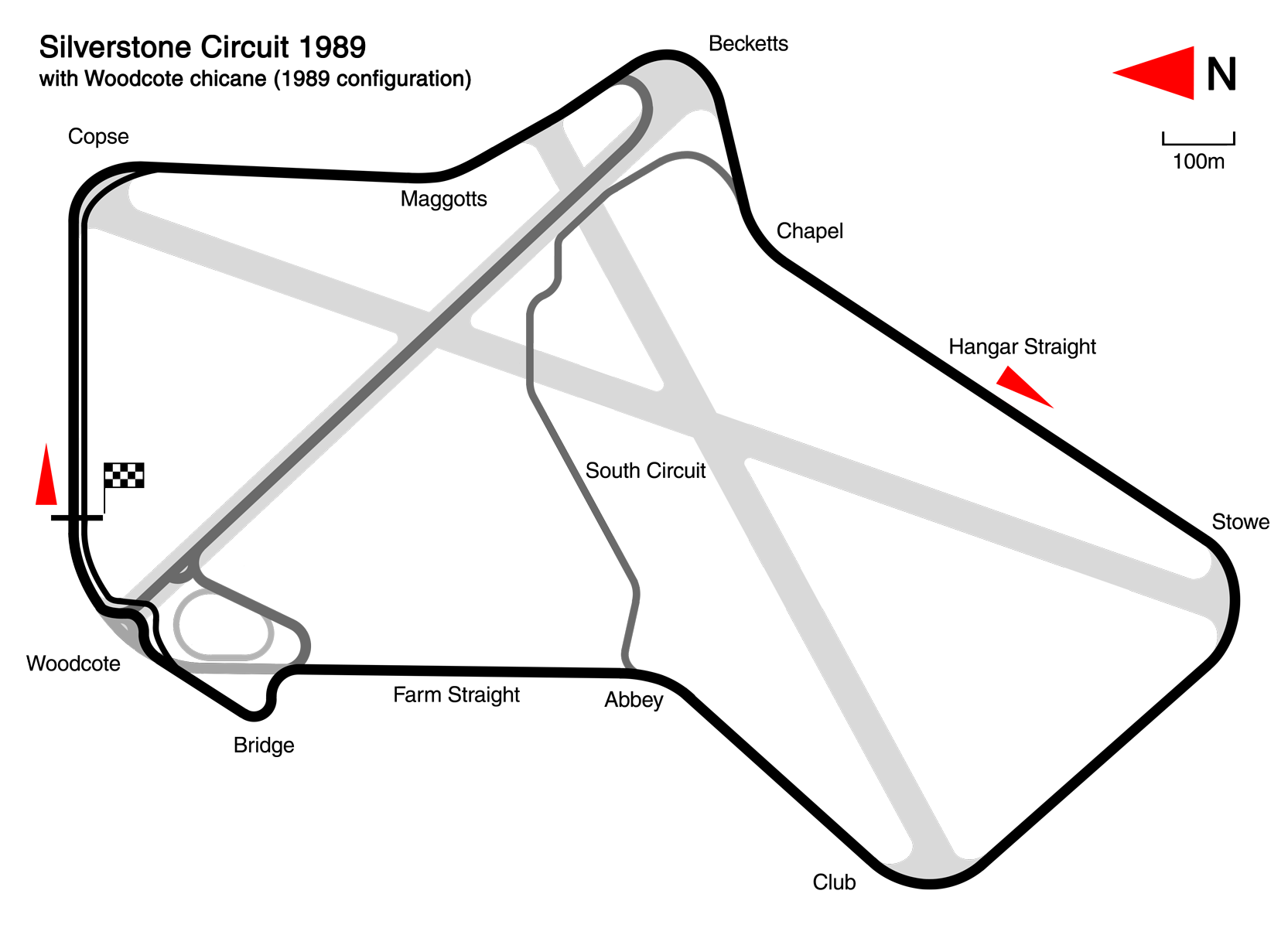
1989: In 1989 the Woodcote Chicane was used for some national level meetings including the British Touring Car Championship. The 1989 configuration had a greater radius to the left hand apex than the 1975–1986 chicane. New tarmac was laid inside the first apex, and the pit entry lane was routed further right as a consequence.

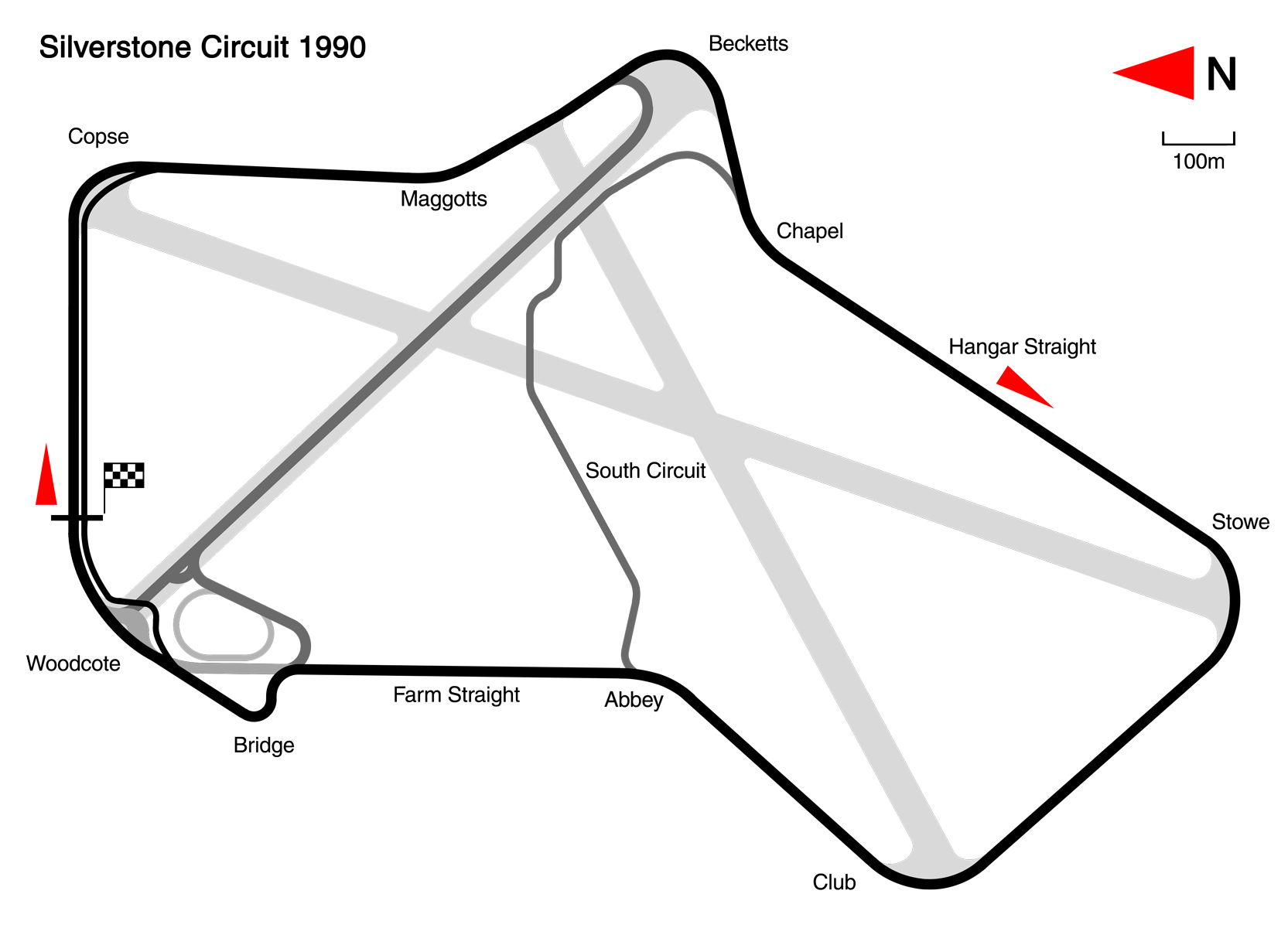
1990: The Woodcote Chicane was once again decommissioned.

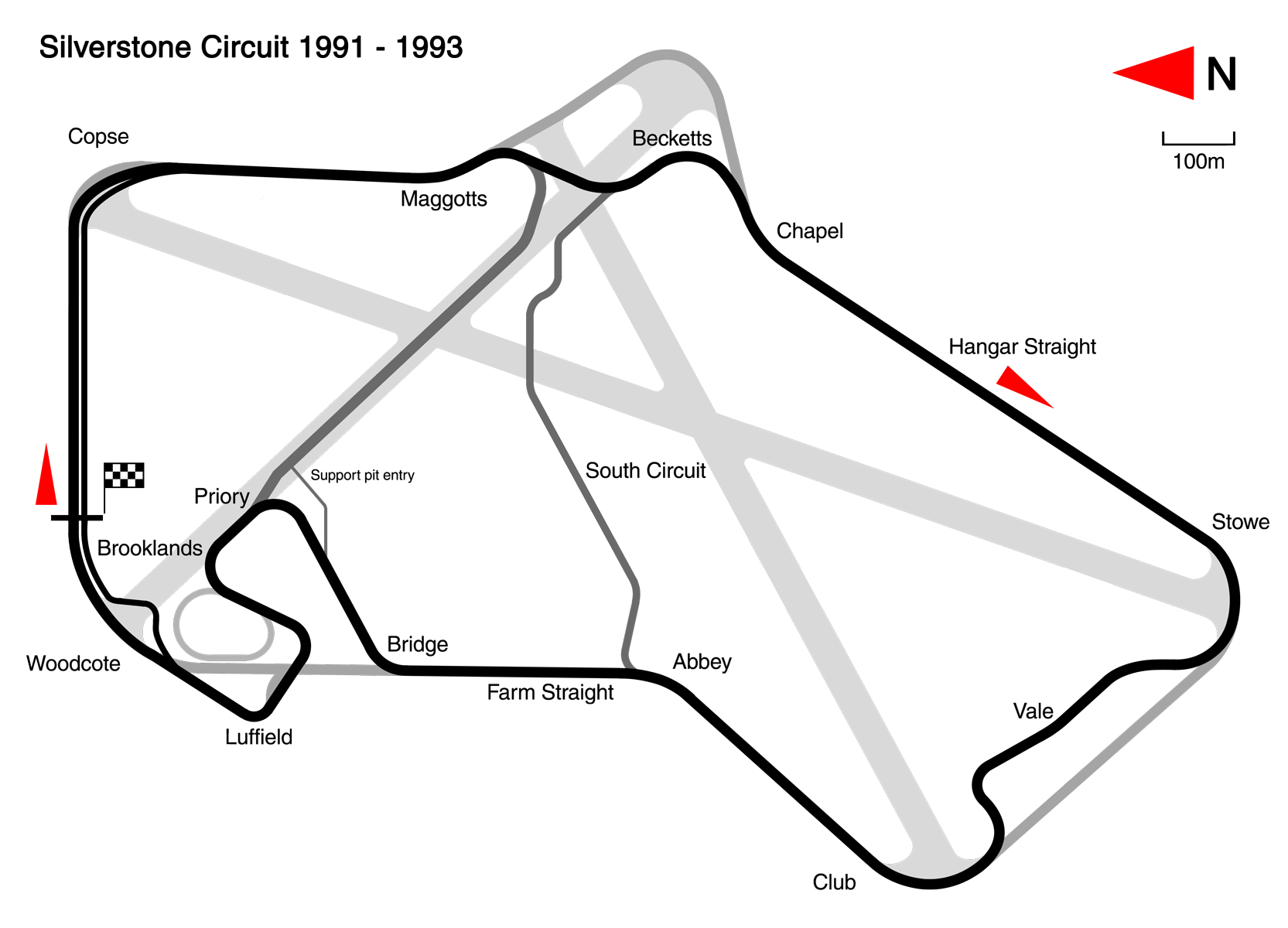
1991 to 1994: Major redesign to the circuit: Copse radius increased; Maggotts and Becketts esses; Stowe, Vale and Club complex; elevation change beyond Abbey; and Bridge, Priory, Brookands and Luffield complex. Track length: 5.226 km. Lap record: Nigel Mansell, Williams-Renault, 1:18.965 (1992 British Grand Prix).

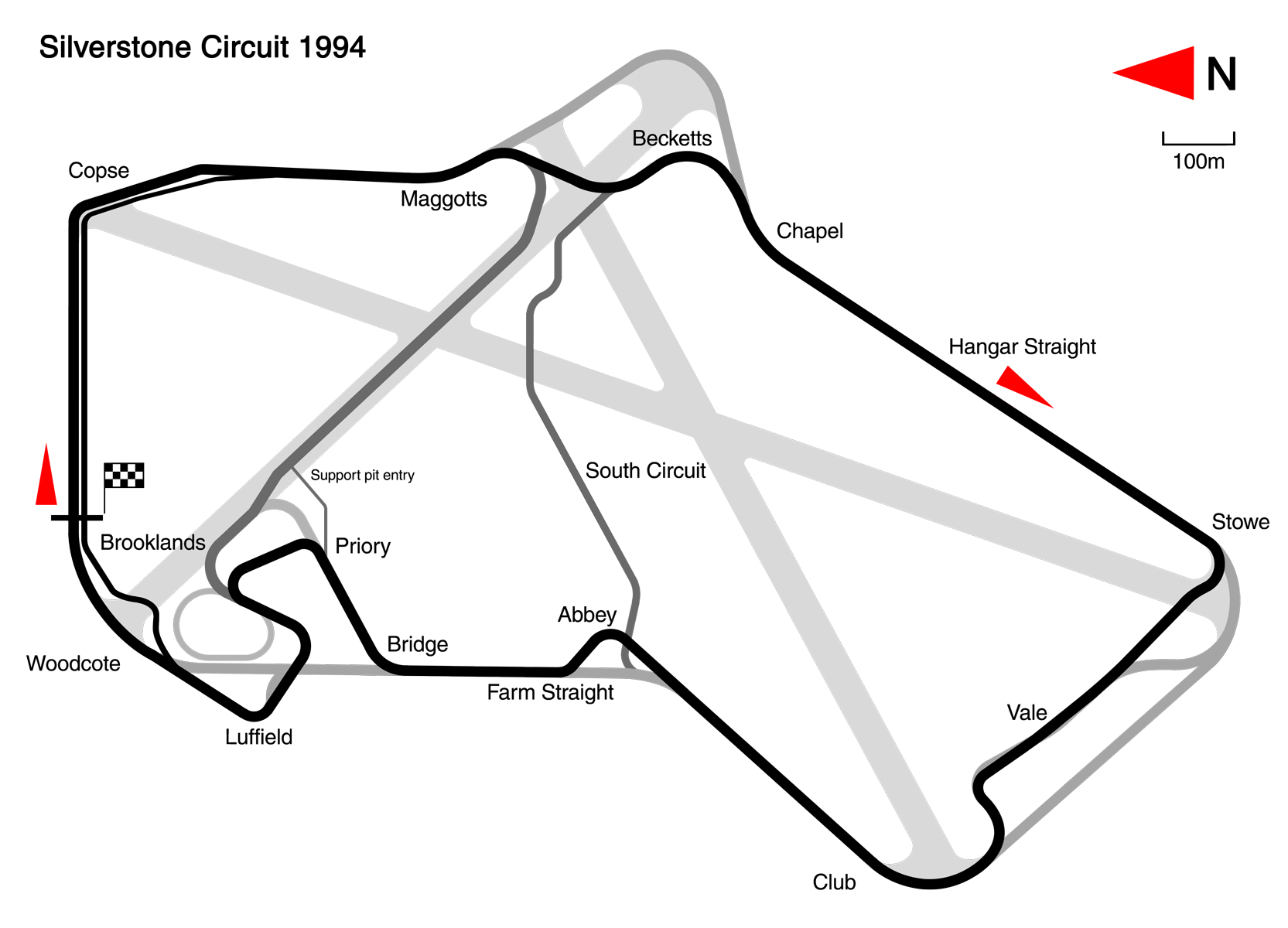
1994: Copse tightened; Maggotts and Becketts resurfaced; Stowe tightened with Vale straightened into tighter Club left apex; Abbey Chicane added; and Priory slower and moved closer to Bridge. Pit entry also rerouted more safely behind wall. Track length: 5.057 km. Lap record: Damon Hill, Williams-Renault, 1:24.960 (1994 British Grand Prix).

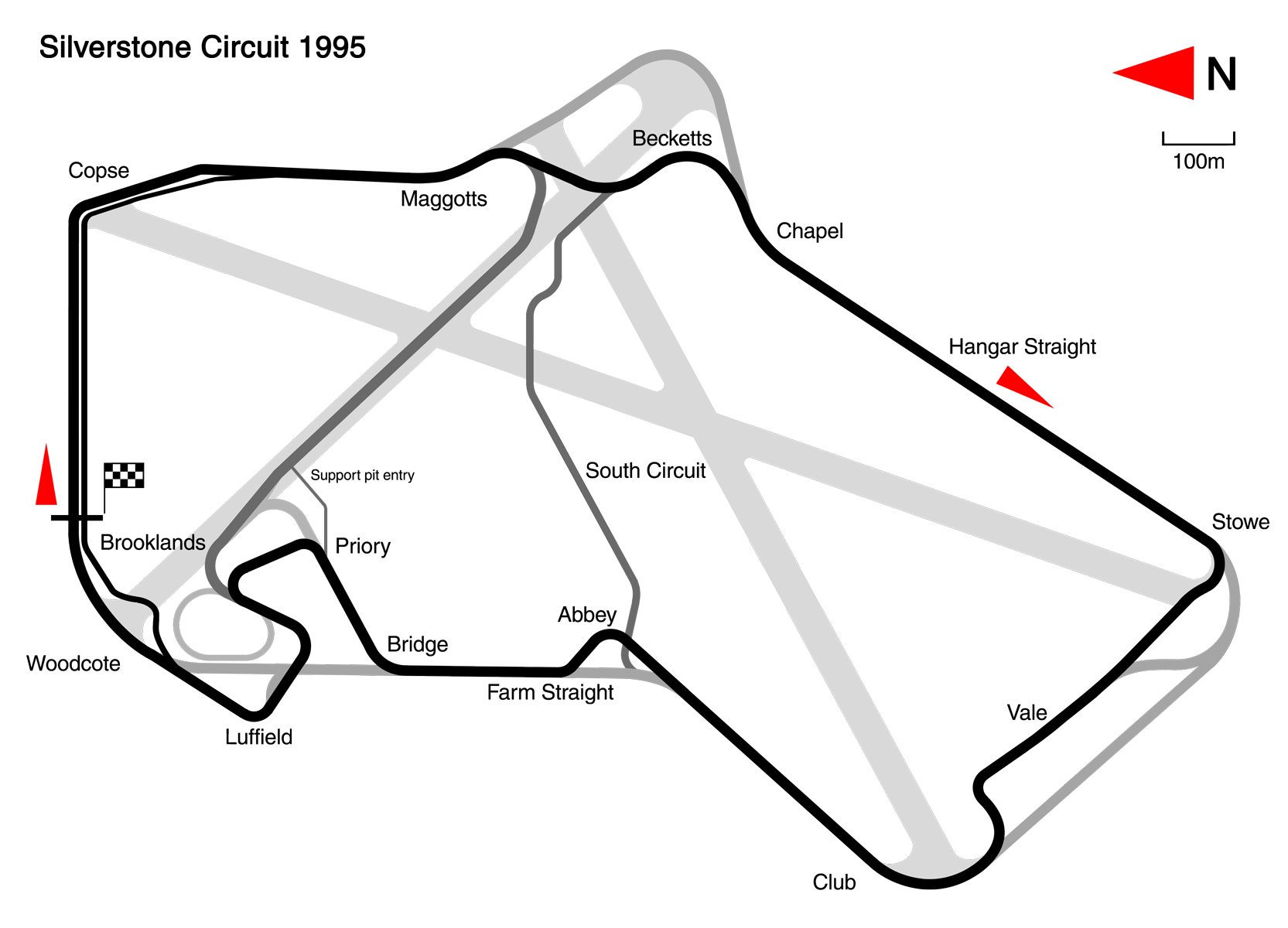
1995: Tarmac from 1991 Vale section removed leaving only 1994 reroute. Left/right kink on entry to Brooklands on National circuit straightened.

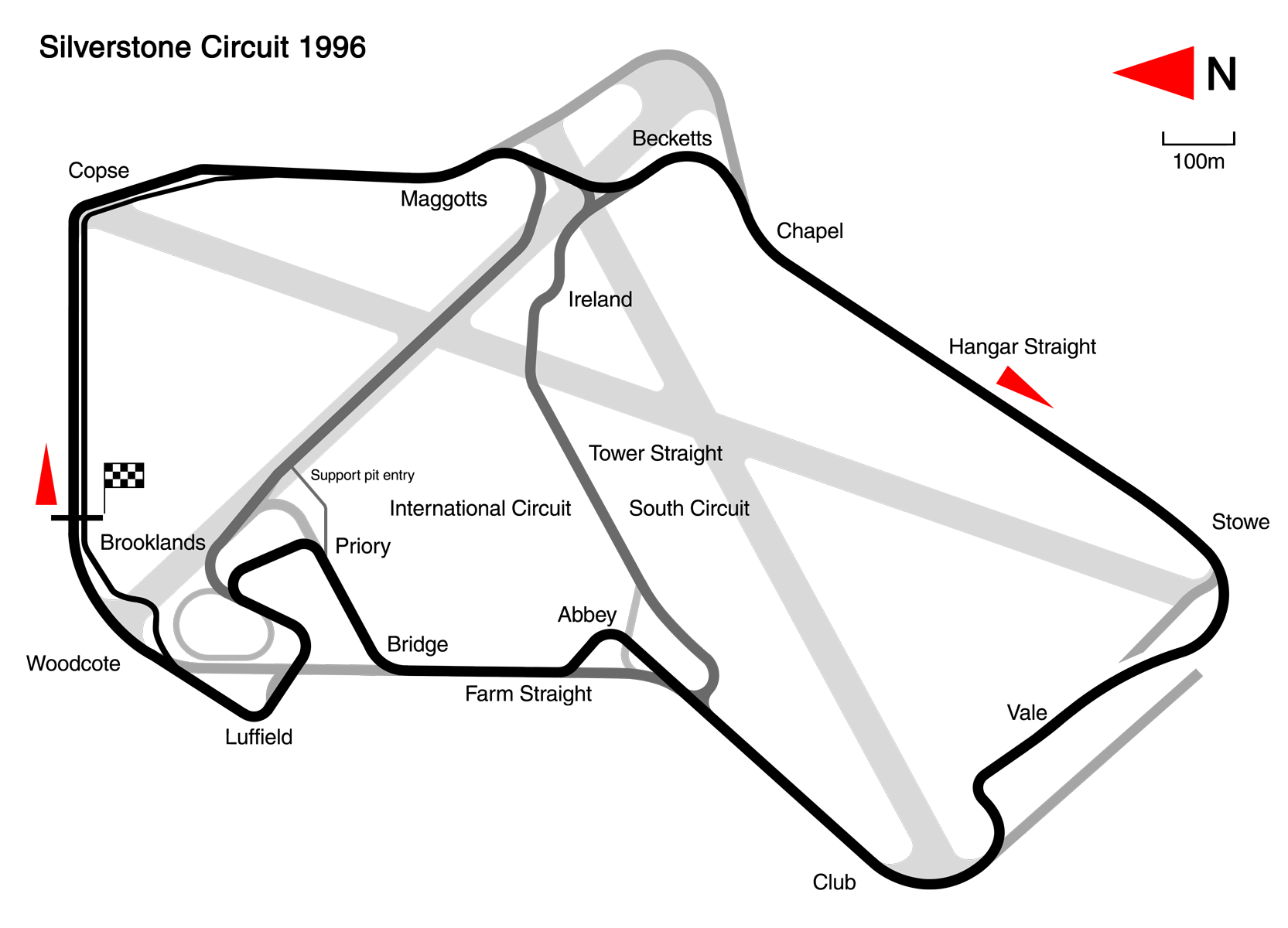
1996: Stowe corner re-profiled to its present fast sweep. International circuit is built over the existing South circuit. Track length: 5.072 km. Lap record: Damon Hill, Williams-Renault, 1:26.875 (1996 British Grand Prix).

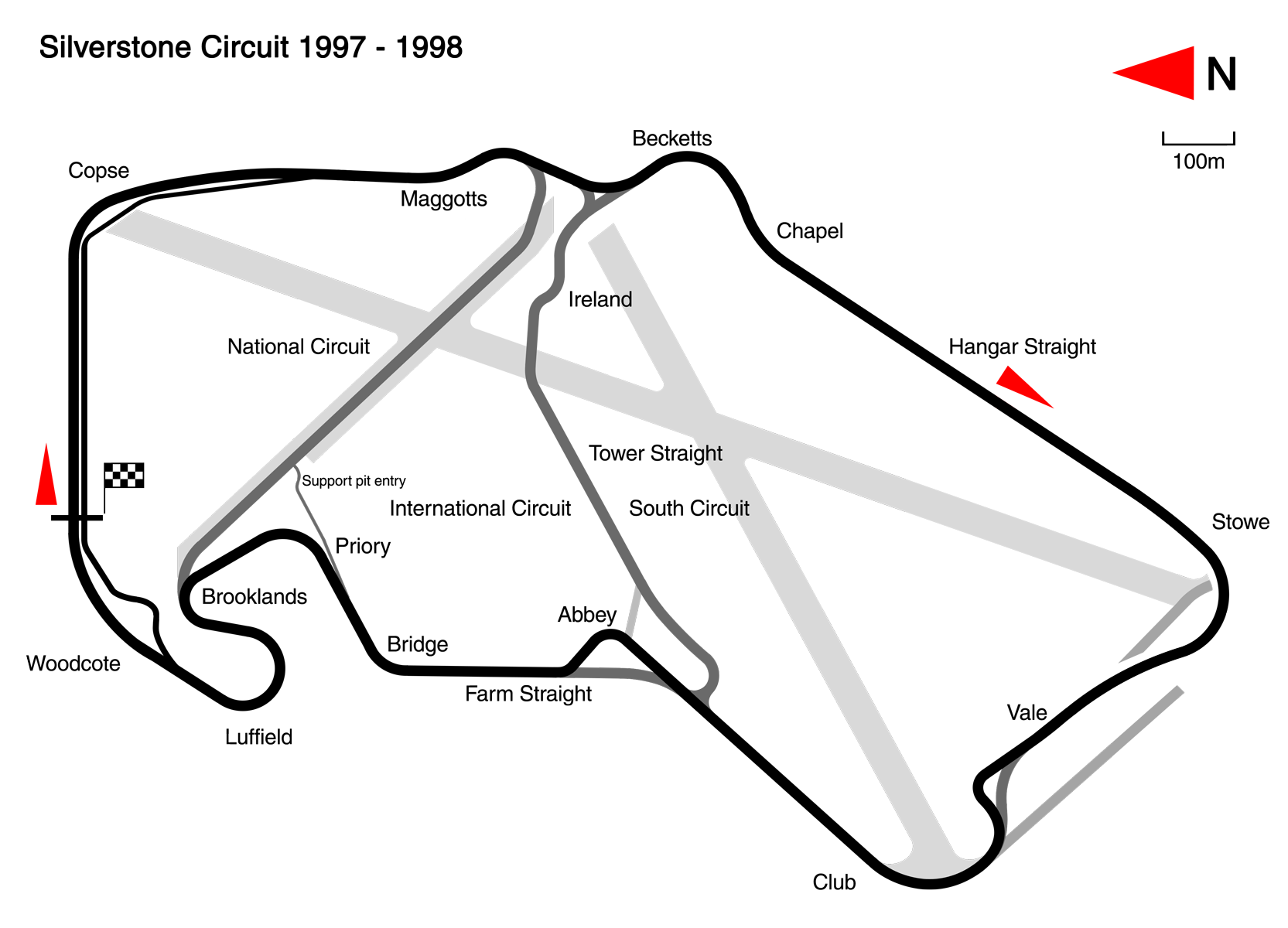
1997 to 1998: Major redesign to Copse, Priory, Brooklands and Luffield, resulting in a faster track. Classic circuit created with extra route at Club. Nearly all old track and runway close to the current circuit was dug up or demolished at this time. Track length: 5.140 km. Lap record: Jacques Villeneuve, Williams-Renault, 1:21.598 (1997 British Grand Prix).

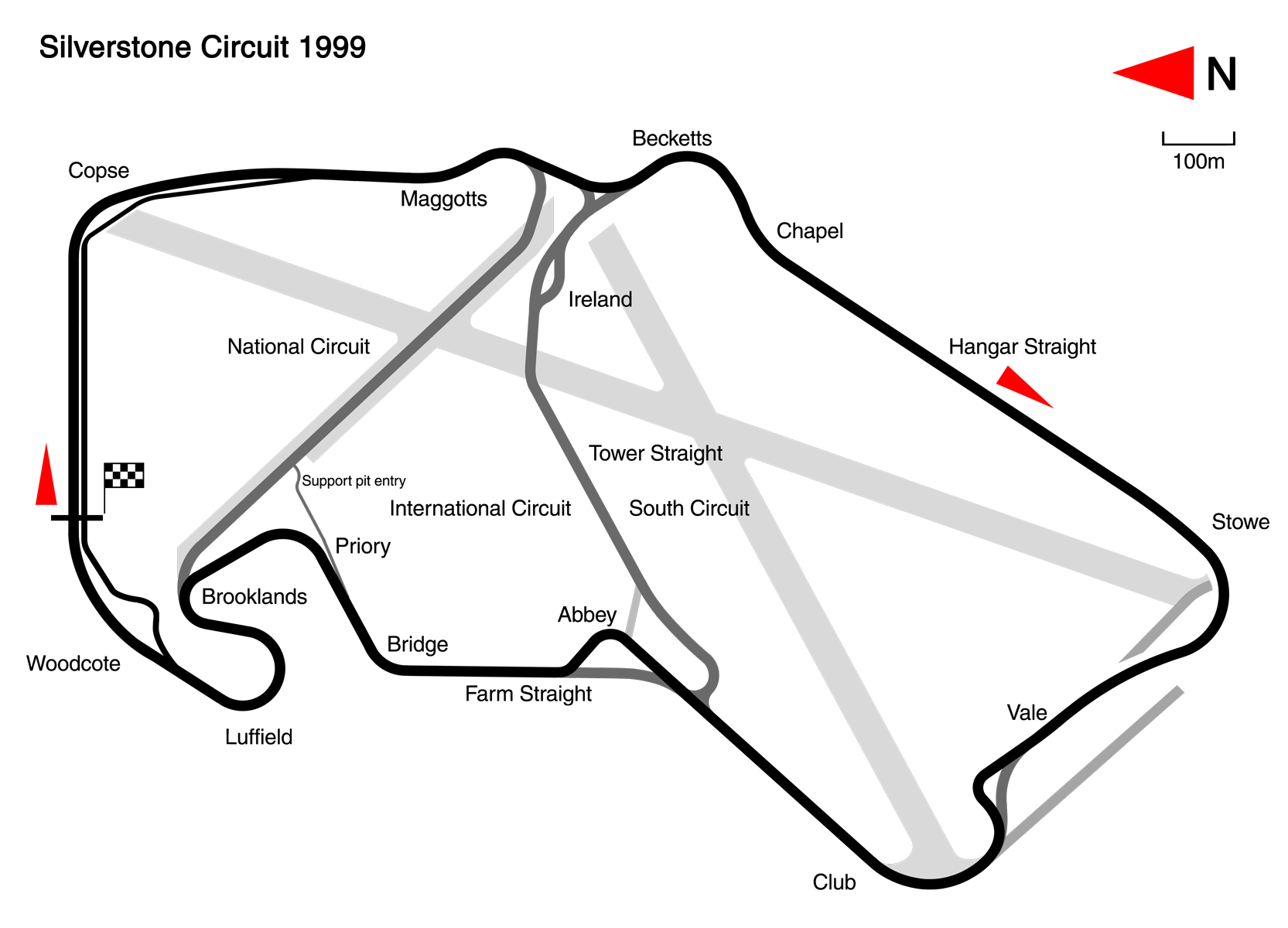
1999: Ireland chicane bypass created on International circuit.

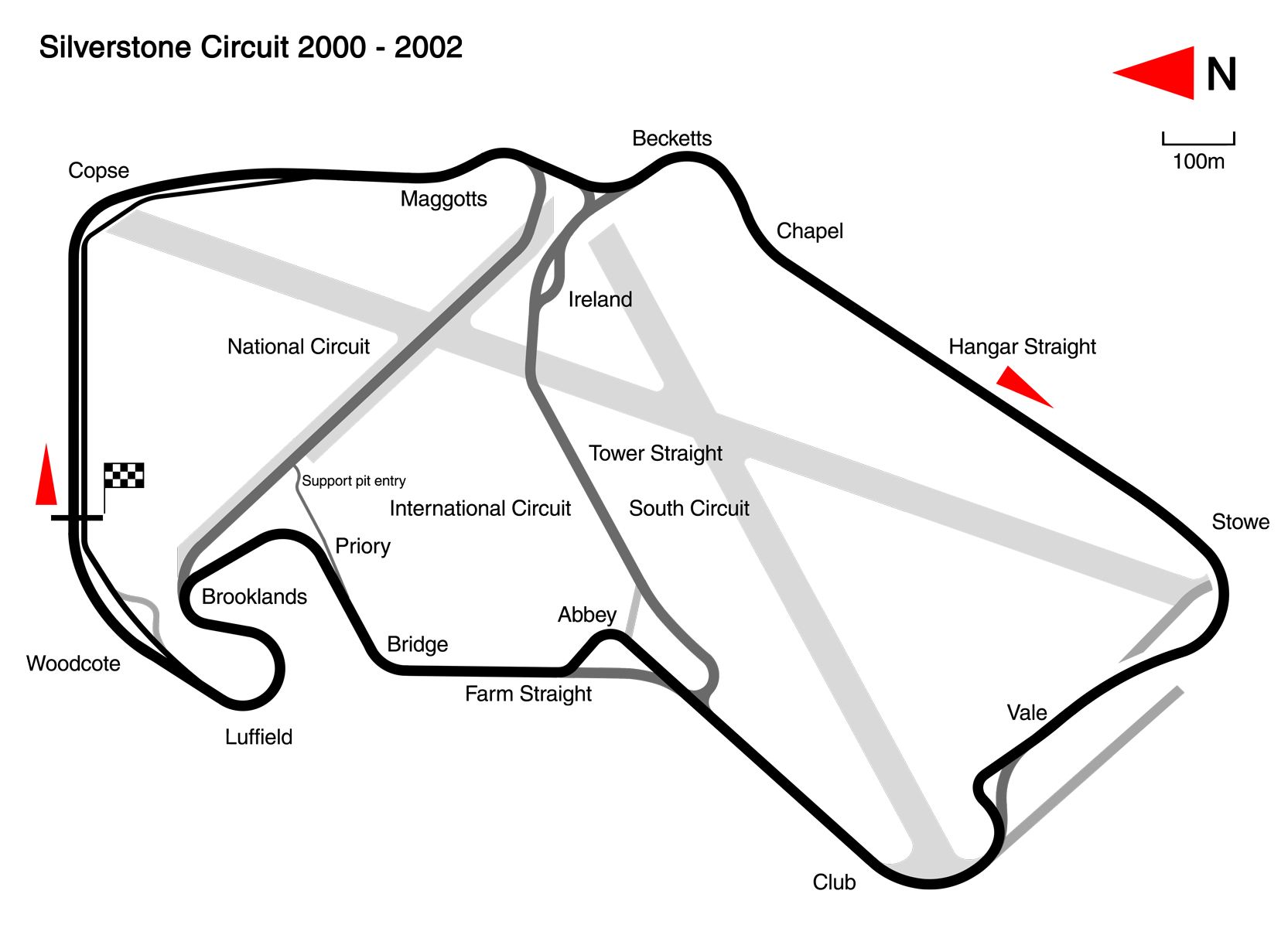
2000 to 2002: Straight line pit lane entry created.

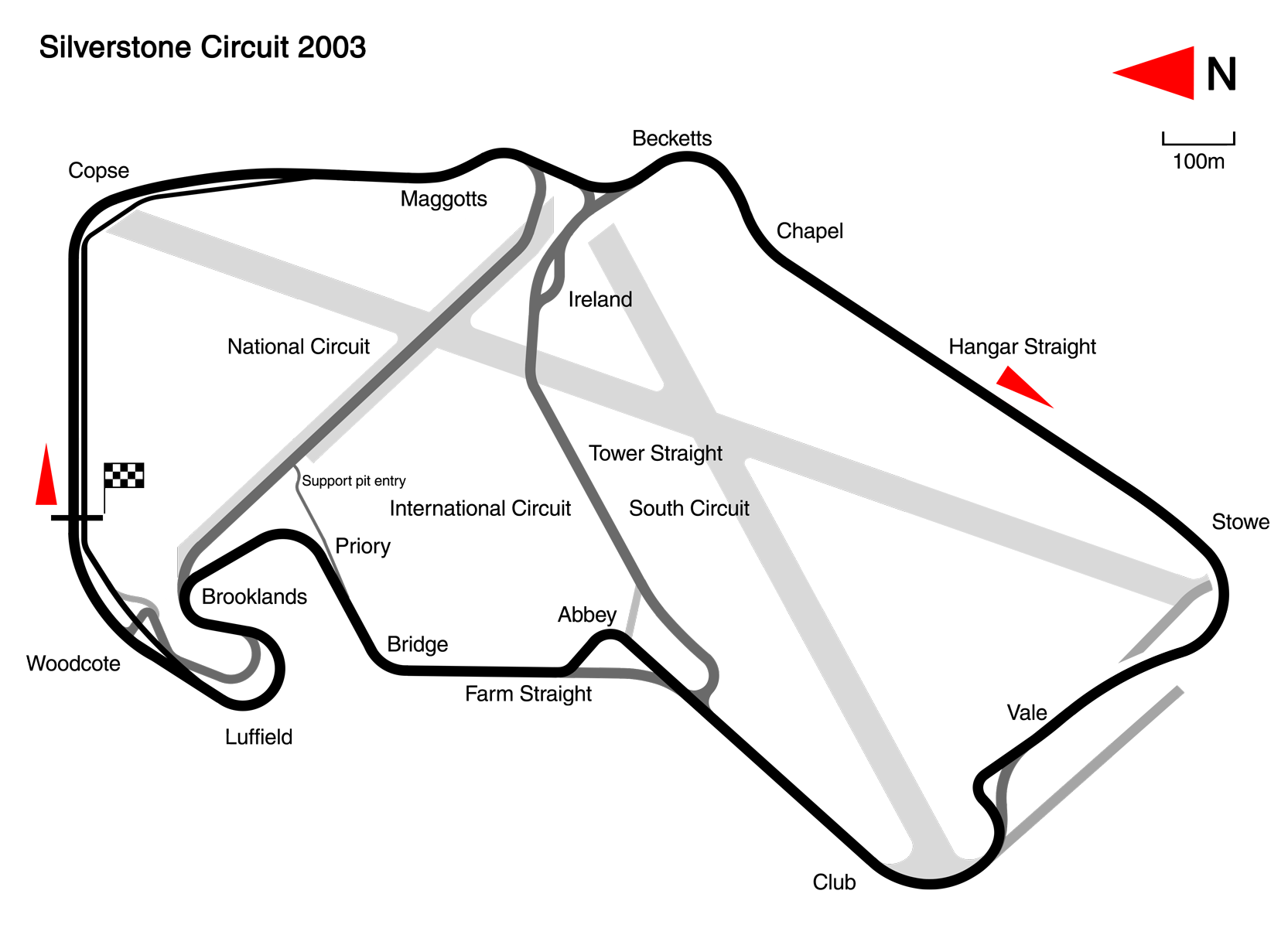
2003: New section inside Luffield with chicane at Woodcote created for motorbikes.

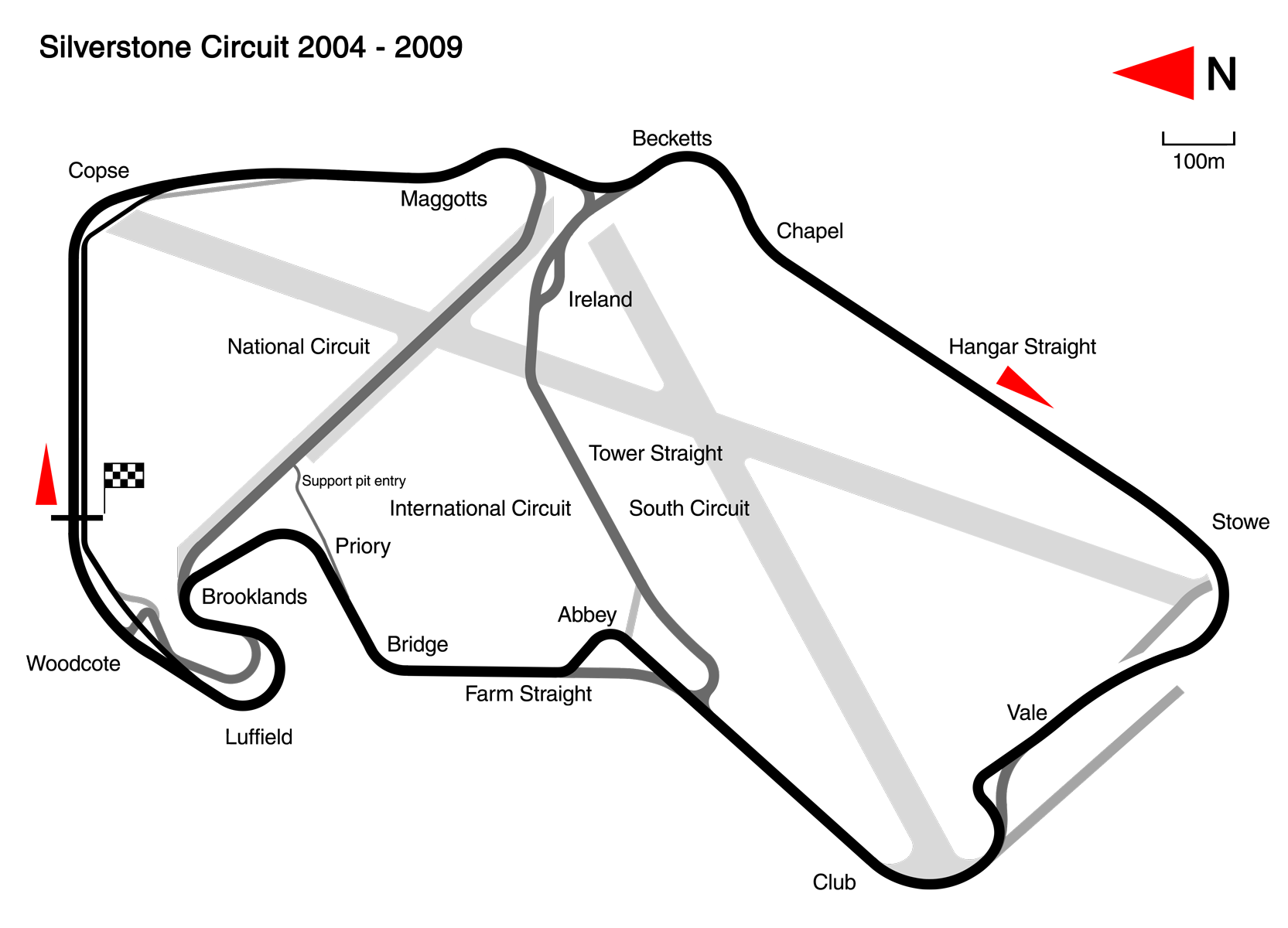
2004 to 2009: Pit exit lane length reduced. Track length: 5.141 km. Lap record: Sebastian Vettel, Red Bull-Renault, 1:18.119 (2009 British Grand Prix).

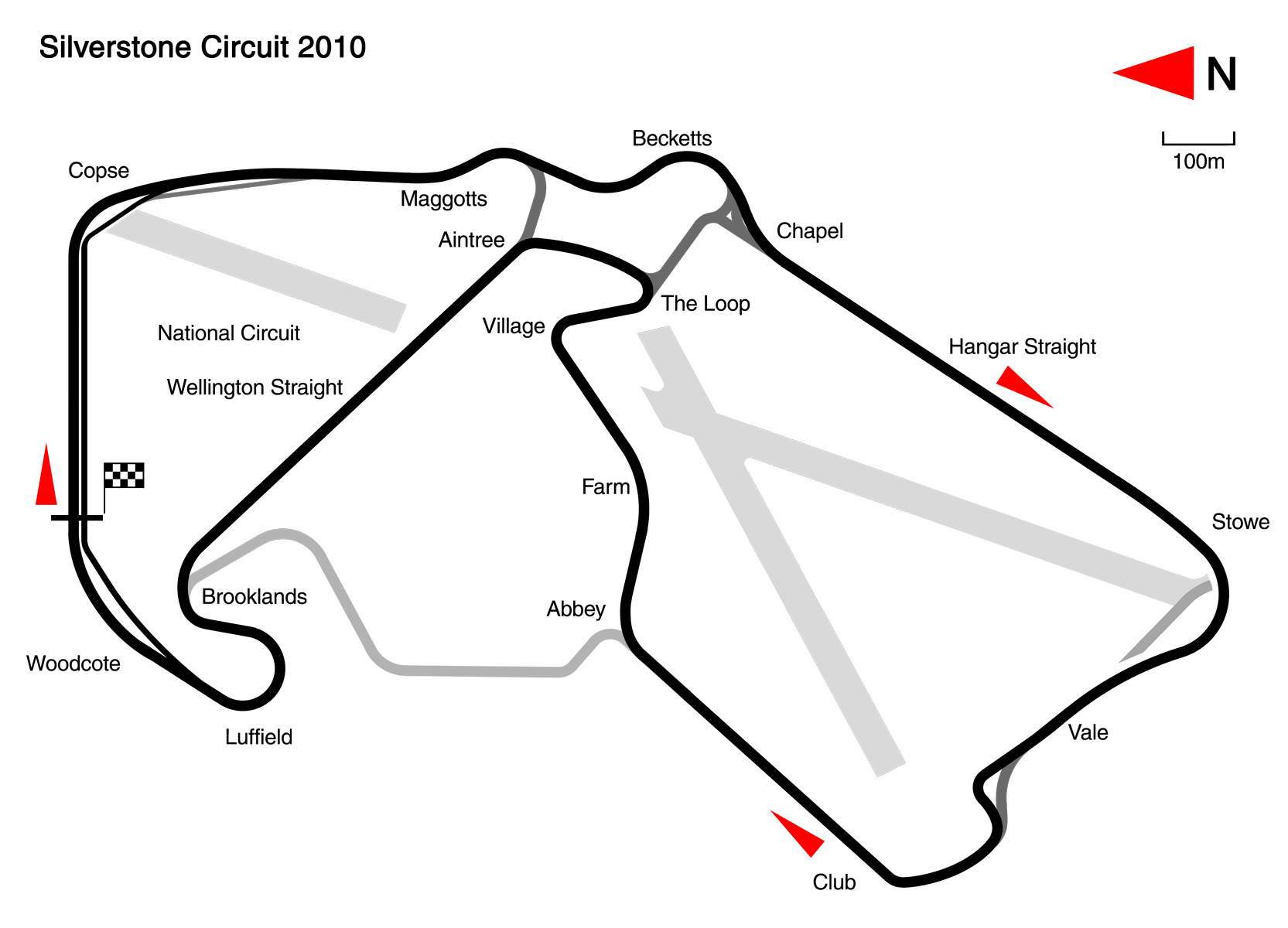
2010: New infield "Arena" section was added to the layout, while Bridge and Priory corners are suppressed. Club re-profiled to allow grid boxes to be in line. Motorbike circuit inside Luffield removed.

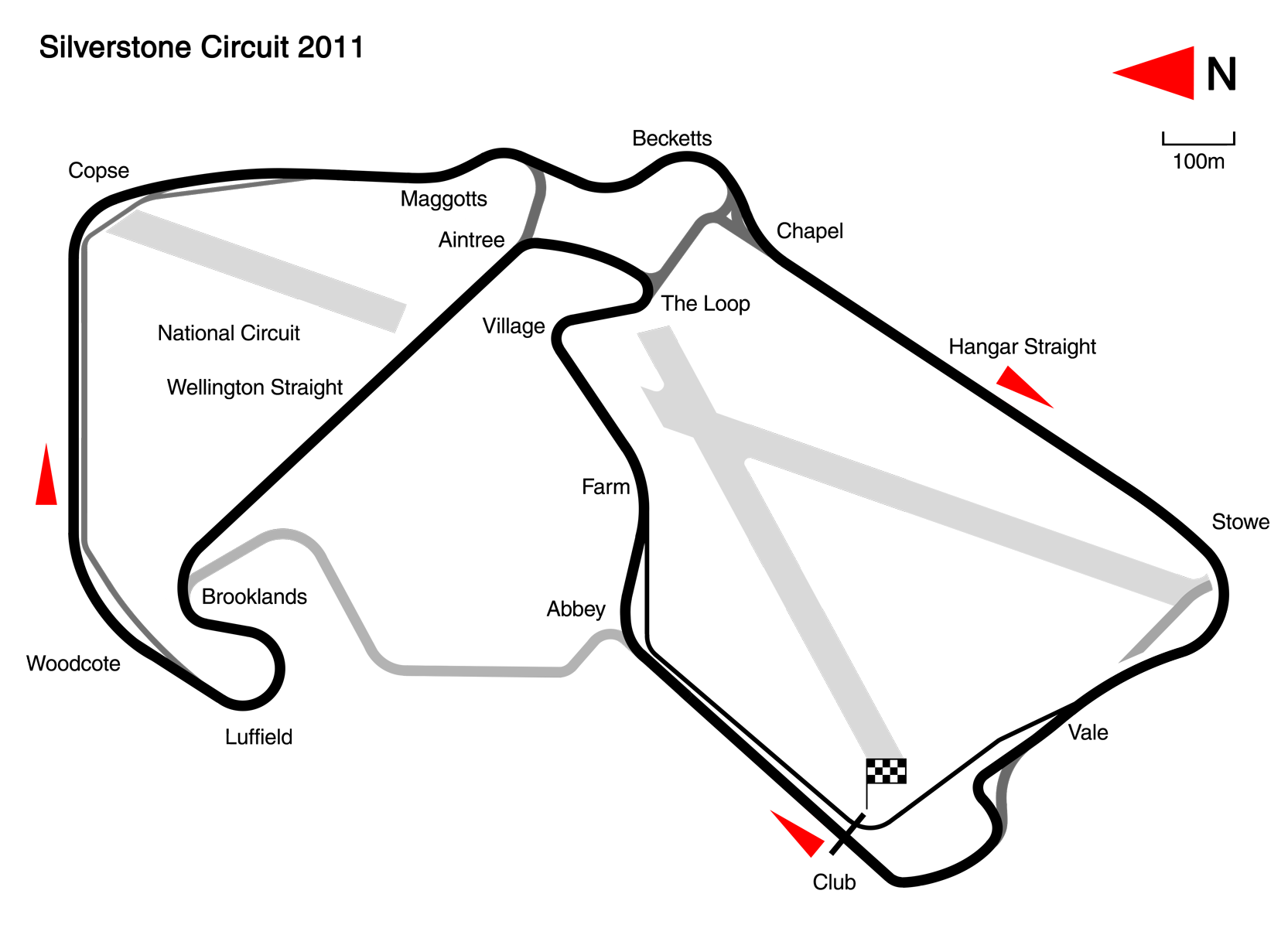
2011–2020: The pit lane was moved to the straight connecting Club and Abbey corners, making Abbey the new first corner.

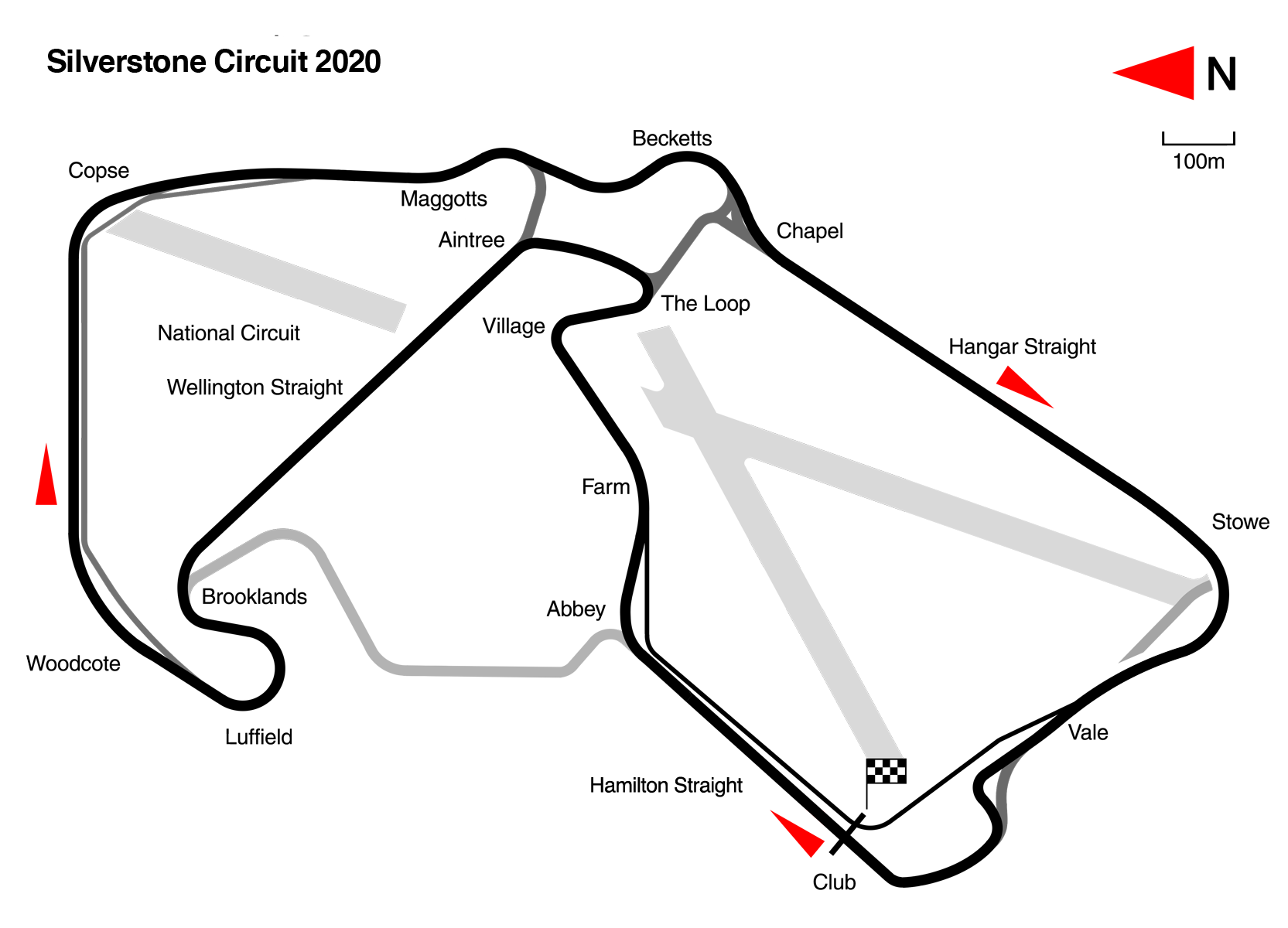
2020–present: The straight between Club and Abbey was renamed the Hamilton Straight.
