= Silverstone Heliport =

Airfield in Buckinghamshire, England

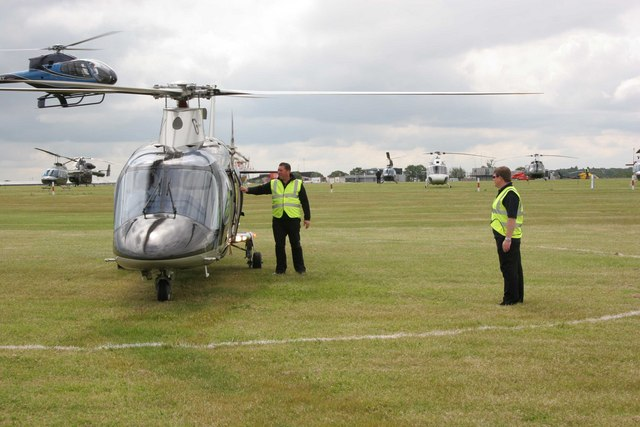
- IATA: none; ICAO: EGBV

Summary
- Airport type: Public
- Operator: Helipad
- Location: Silverstone, Buckinghamshire, England
- Elevation AMSL: 502 ft / 153 m
- Coordinates: 52°04′14″N 001°00′44″W

Map
- Location in Buckinghamshire

Helipads
Number	Length		Surface
Number	m	ft	Surface
06/24	235 × 32	771 × 105	Grass
- Sources: UK AIP at NATS

Silverstone Heliport (ICAO: EGBV) is 5 nautical miles (9.3 km; 5.8 mi) north of Buckingham, Buckinghamshire, England and within the Silverstone Circuit motor racing track, formerly RAF Silverstone.

Silverstone Northern Heliport had a CAA Ordinary Licence (Number P874) that allows flights for the public transport of passengers or for flying instruction as authorised by the licensee (Silverstone Circuits Limited). The aerodrome is not licensed for night use.

The site was the world's busiest heliport for one day during the 1999 British Grand Prix, handling 4,000 aircraft movements in one day. The airfield used six air traffic controllers and a continuous message broadcast (ATIS) service.

Many flights relate to the annual Grand Prix events but fewer than in 1999 due to improved roads to the venue.

The helipads/short strips are within yards of the southern extent of Northamptonshire (considered the East Midlands), which straddles the course.
