= RAF Silverstone =

Airfield near Silverstone, Northamptonshire/Buckinghamshire

RAF Silverstone
- Silverstone, Northamptonshire in England
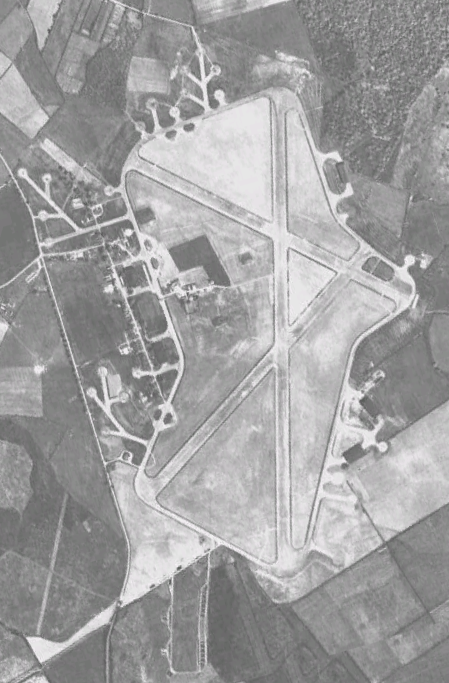
- RAF Silverstone in 1945.

Site information
- Type: Royal Air Force station
- Owner: Air Ministry
- Operator: Royal Air Force
- Controlled by: RAF Bomber Command

Location
- Shown within Northamptonshire RAF Silverstone (the United Kingdom)
- Coordinates: 52°04′19″N 001°00′44″W

Site history
- Built: 1942
- In use: 1943–1947
- Battles/wars: European theatre of World War II

Airfield information
- Elevation: 156 metres (512 ft) AMSL
Runways
Direction	Length and surface
02/20	1,672 metres (5,486 ft) Asphalt
06/24	1,170 metres (3,839 ft) Asphalt
14/32	1,087 metres (3,566 ft) Asphalt

Royal Air Force Silverstone or more simply RAF Silverstone is a former Royal Air Force (RAF) station, built during the Second World War, and used by the RAF from 1943 until 1947. It straddles the Northamptonshire and Buckinghamshire border 10 miles (16 km) south west of Northampton, and is named after the nearby village of Silverstone.

In 1948, the Royal Automobile Club hosted the first British Grand Prix at this location, and the site is now Silverstone Circuit.

== RAF use 1943–1947 ==
The station was the base for No. 17 Operational Training Unit RAF operating the Vickers Wellington bomber.

== Since 1948 ==
Today the airfield is a major racing circuit known as Silverstone. Private aircraft and helicopters have continued to use this location, particularly in 2009 for the World Aerobatic Championships, but mostly it is now helicopters in connection with motor racing events. The airfield's three runways, in a standard World War II era triangle, lie within the outline of the classic racetrack, but have either been removed, or re-purposed and are no longer available as dedicated runways. In 2010 the main straight between turn 5 and turn 6, following the line of one of the runways, was renamed the 'Wellington Straight'.

The circuit is also home to the Silverstone Heliport.

== See also ==
- List of former Royal Air Force stations
