= Class A airfield =

Standard British air base design of World War II

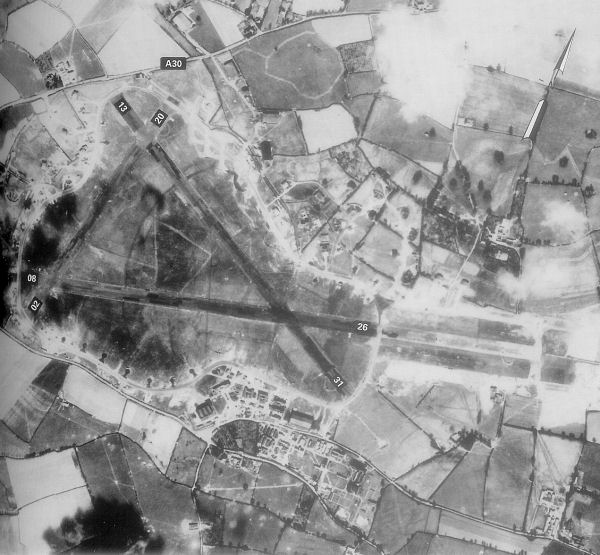
Aerial view of RAF Exeter airfield on 20 May 1944, showing the triangular layout of the runways and the encircling (light-coloured) perimeter track.

Class A airfields were World War II military installations constructed to specifications laid down by the British Air Ministry Directorate General of Works (AMDGW). Intended for use by heavy bombers and transports, they were the standard airbase design for the Royal Air Force (RAF) as well as United States Army Air Forces (USAAF) units operating from the United Kingdom (UK).

Upon the entry of the United States into World War II, a number of Royal Air Force Class A bases were transferred to the U.S. Eighth Air Force for use as heavy bomber bases, with the RAF units formerly occupying them being redeployed to other RAF bomber airfields, and U.S. Army Engineer Units constructed more airfields to this standard, or brought earlier airfields up to this specification by lengthening runways, etc. Many units of the U.S. Ninth Air Force also flew from Class A airfields. The term Class 'A' came about because, quite often, the resultant aerial shot of the crossed runways would look like the capital letter A.

== Design ==
The specifications set by the British Air Ministry in August 1942 called for three converging landing strips, each containing a concrete runway optimally placed, if practicable at the site, at 60-degree angles to each other in a triangular pattern. The longest landing strip was designated the main landing strip, and aligned south-west to north-east wherever possible, this being chosen to allow aircraft to take off and land into the prevailing wind. The other two runways were to allow safe takeoff and landing from either end when the wind was blowing from other directions. The primary consideration was for operational safety for any type of aircraft then in operation or under development.

The runways were connected by taxiways called a 'perimeter track' (peri-track), of a standard width of 50 feet (15 metres). However, certain stations that were designated to be fighter bases sometimes had a narrower perimeter track, such as RAF Coltishall, whose peri-tracks measured 40 feet (12 metres) across. A 30 feet (9 metres) area was cleared and levelled on either side of the perimeter track. Class A specifications for taxiways set a minimum curve radius of 150 feet (46 metres) measured from the centreline for angles greater than 60 degrees and 200 feet (61 metres) for angles less than 60 degrees. Perimeter track gradients could not exceed 1-in-40 in any direction, and no building could be placed closer than 150 feet (46 metres) from the edge of the track.

Areas called dispersed 'hardstands' were placed along the perimeter track, made of concrete, with their centres at least 150 feet (46 metres) from the edge of the track, and the edges of each hardstand separated from each other and from the funnels by a minimum of 150 feet (46 metres). The purpose of the hardstands was to allow aircraft to be dispersed some distance from each other so that an air attack on the airfield would be less likely to destroy all the aircraft at once. Dispersal also minimised the chance of collateral damage to other aircraft should an accident occur whilst loading bombs and other munitions on aircraft. Hardstands were either of the 'frying-pan' or 'spectacle loop' type, with the spectacle type being the easiest in which to manoeuvre aircraft.

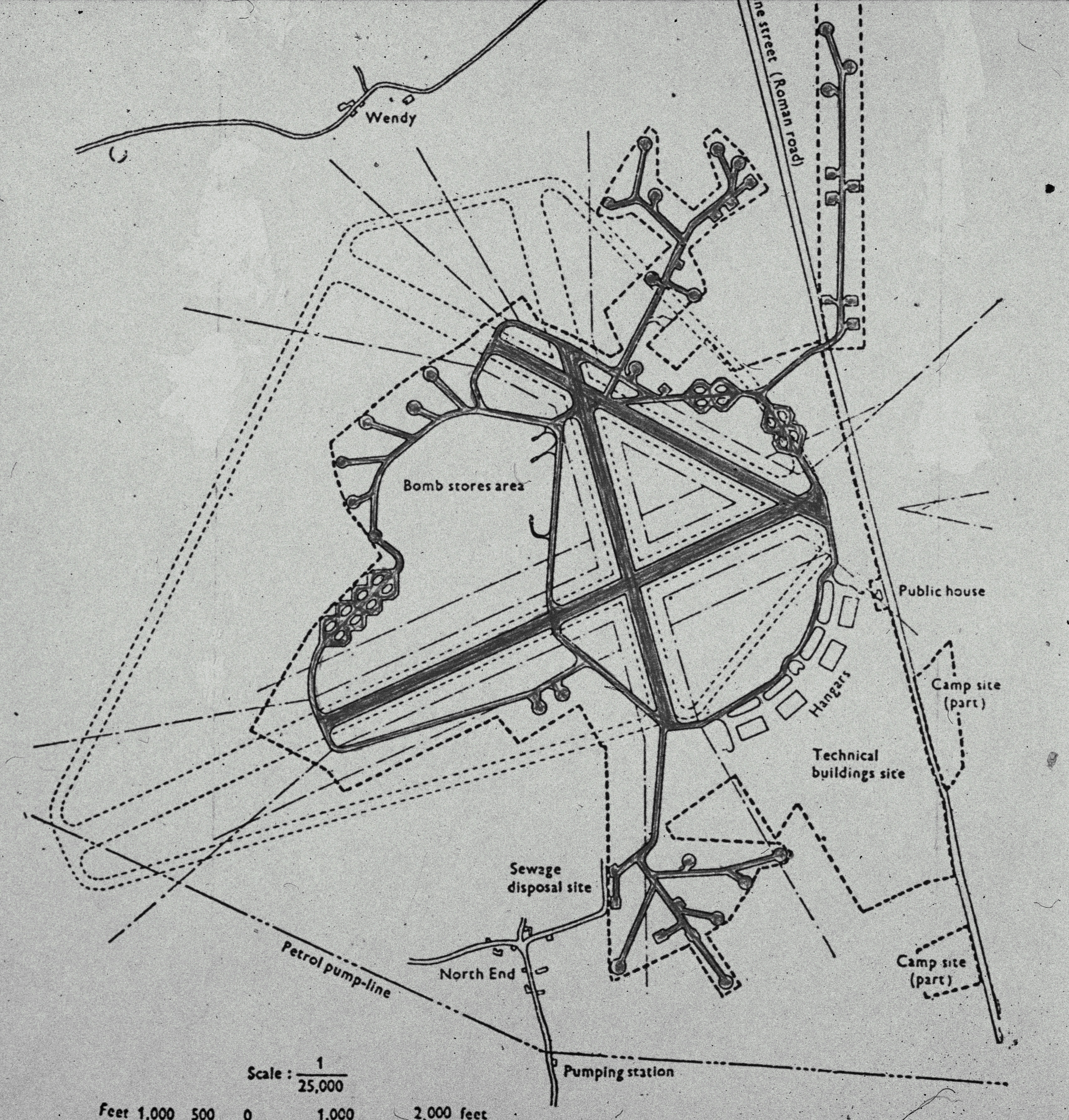
RAF Bassingbourn in 1945, the frying-pan and spectacle loop aircraft dispersals are easy to identify

The landing strips were 600 feet (183 metres) in width, cleared, graded, and surfaced with turf. A concrete runway 150 feet (46 metres) in width was centred on the strip, with a length of at least 2,000 yards (1,829 metres) for the main landing strip, and at least 1,400 yards (1,280 metres) for the secondary landing strips. On each side of the landing strip, the field was cleared of obstructions and levelled an additional 300 feet (91 metres). Gradients for the landing strips were a maximum 1-in-80 longitudinally and 1-in-60 transversely. In addition, an area at the end of each runway was cleared of obstructions at an angle of fifteen degrees outward from each side on a rising imaginary plane of 1-in-50 to provide a flight way called a funnel.

== Construction ==
The material needs for building runways suitable for heavy bombers were approximately 18,000 long tons (18,289 metric tons; 20,160 short tons) of dry cement and 90,000 long tons (91,444 metric tons; 100,800 short tons) of aggregate. Expected stress factors of 2,000 pounds per square inch (13,790 kilopascals) led to runway thicknesses of 6 to 9 inches (150 to 230 millimetres) of concrete slab laid on a hardcore base, covered with a layer of bitumen asphalt. In areas where there was no natural rock, such as East Anglia, stone had to be imported for the hardcore. Up to six trains ran daily from London to East Anglia carrying rubble from destroyed buildings in Luftwaffe raids. This material was used as hardcore for the airfields.

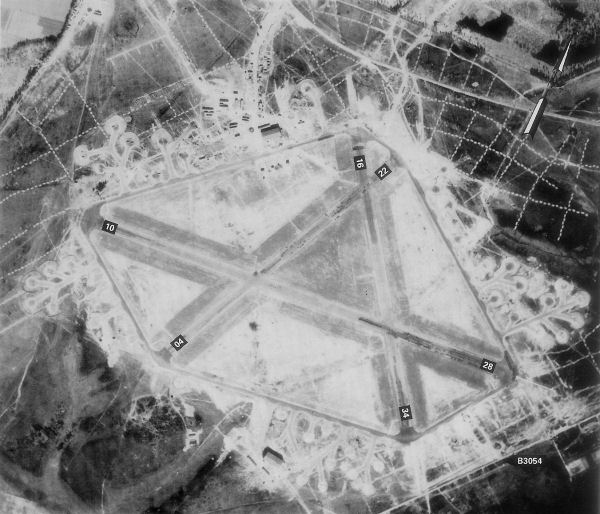
The runways at RAF Beaulieu.

== Operational use ==
Nine airfields (RAF Alconbury, RAF Bassingbourn, RAF Chelveston, RAF Grafton Underwood, RAF Kimbolton, RAF Molesworth, RAF Podington, RAF Polebrook, and RAF Thurleigh) were allotted to the Eighth Air Force, but had been completed prior to the Class A standard for runway lengths. These were brought to Class A standards in 1942 and early 1943 by extending their runways, repositioning their perimeter tracks, and adding additional dispersed hardstands.

Class A airfields were also characterised by standardised technical site requirements for repair, maintenance, and storage of aircraft. Two T2-type metal hangars; 240 by 115 by 29 feet (73.2 by 35.1 by 8.8 metres), were the standard for most airfields, although a few pre-1942 bases had three T2 hangars, and Thurleigh had four. Three bases (Chelveston, Molesworth, and Polebrook) also had a J-type brick-and-metal hangar; 300 by 151 feet (91.4 by 46.0 metres), in addition to a pair of T2's, and Bassingbourn, which had been a pre-war RAF bomber station, had four C-type brick hangars measuring 300 by 152 feet (91.4 by 46.3 metres).

Several airfields had their runways widened and extended in length for emergency landing of damaged bombers after operations over Germany, these airfields, RAF Woodbridge, RAF Carnaby, and RAF Manston being designated as 'Emergency Landing Grounds' (ELG). These ELG airfields had some of the first fitments of the fog-dispersing installation, Fog Investigation and Dispersal Operation (FIDO).

== Post-war motorsport use ==
With the end of World War II, and the resurgence of the sport of motor racing, several former RAF airfields were used as race tracks, including Silverstone (formerly RAF Silverstone, location of the very first Formula 1 Grand Prix), Snetterton (formerly RAF Snetterton Heath), Castle Combe, Goodwood, and Thruxton (formerly RAF Thruxton).

Most race tracks on former RAF airfields use the encircling perimeter track, although the main straight at Snetterton is laid down on a secondary runway, and the main runway is used at Santa Pod Raceway (formerly RAF Podington) for drag racing.

== See also ==
- List of Royal Air Force stations
- Advanced Landing Ground
