= Petite Terre =

Petite Terre or Petite-Terre (French for "small land") may refer to:

- Petite Terre Islands, in Guadeloupe
  - Petite Terre Islands National Nature Reserve
- Pamanzi, also known as Petite-Terre, the second largest island in Mayotte
