= Petite Terre Islands National Nature Reserve =

Reserve of the Petite Terre Islands in Guadeloupe

- IUCN category IV (habitat/species management area)
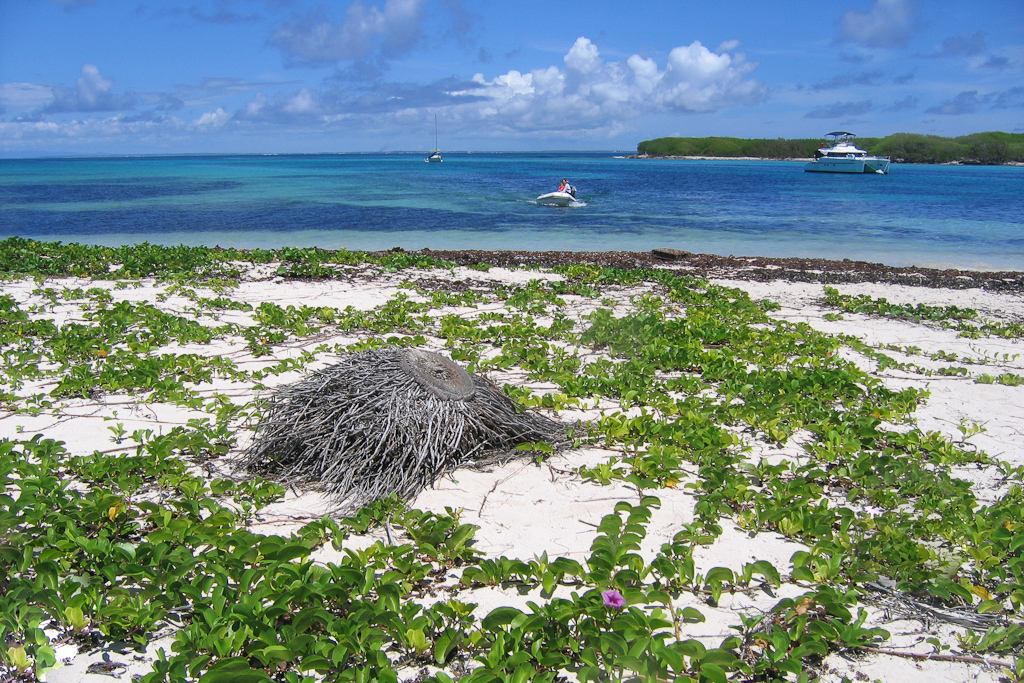
- Réserve naturelle nationale des îles de la Petite-Terre

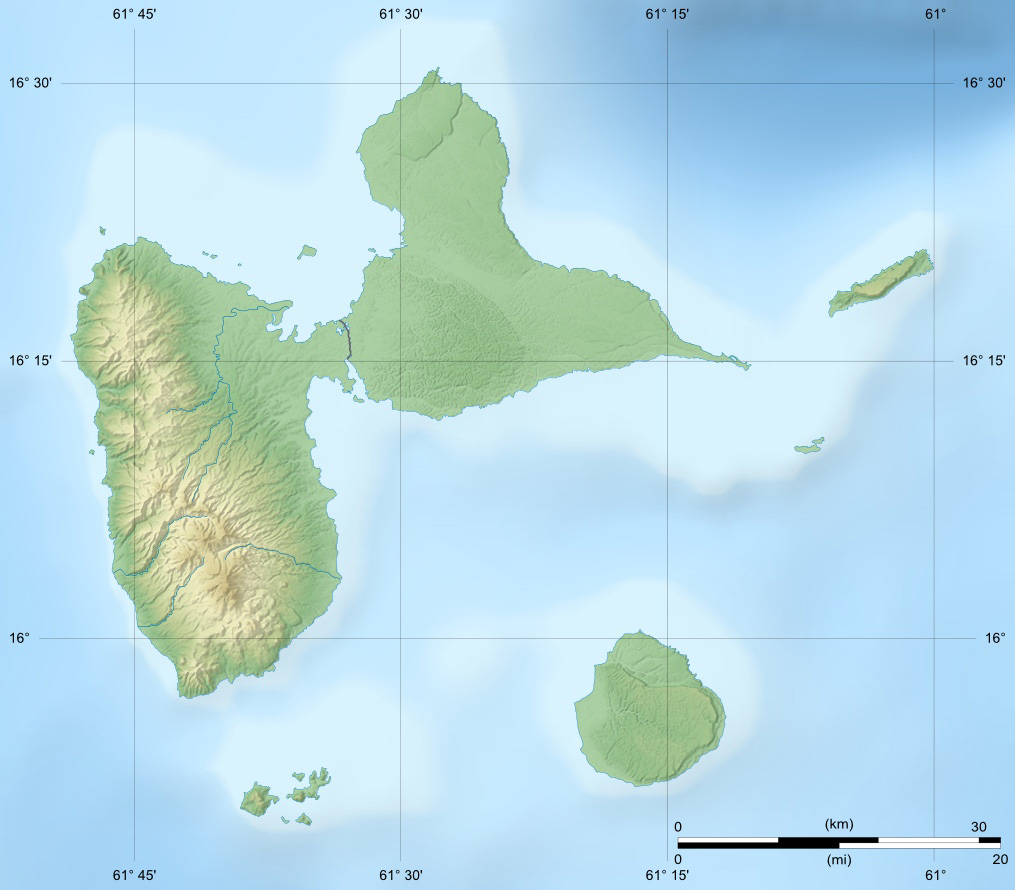
- Location within Guadeloupe
- Location: Desirade Island, Guadeloupe
- Nearest city: Desirade
- Coordinates: 16°10′23″N 61°07′08″W
- Area: 990 ha (2,446 acres)
- Established: 3 September 1998

Petite Terre Islands National Nature Reserve (French: Réserve naturelle nationale des îles de la Petite-Terre) is a reserve of the Petite Terre Islands in Guadeloupe. The reserve was established by Decree No. 98-801 of 3 September 1998 as the nature reserve for the islands of Petite Terre. It covers an area of about 990 hectares (2,400 acres), which is demarcated by five points fixed with buoys, and includes a land area of 148.6 hectares (367 acres) with the balance as sea area.

The reserve conserves terrestrial and marine habitats, and the most notable fauna are Lesser Antillean Iguana (Iguana delicatissima), as well as many species of sea turtles. The flora of importance is guaiac, a small tree which is nearing extinction in the Lesser Antilles.

== Geography ==
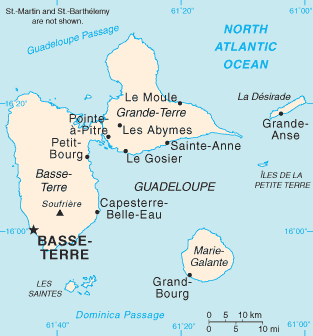

The reserve is located within the municipal limits of La Désirade. The land part of the reserve consists of two islands: Terre-de-Haut (High Earth, 31 hectares or 77 acres) and Terre-de-Bas (Low Earth, 117 hectares or 290 acres), with a narrow channel of 150 meters (490 ft) width between them, forming the lagoon. It is 12 kilometers (7.5 mi) south of La Désirade, and 8 kilometers (5.0 mi) east of Pointe des Chateaux.

Terre-de-Bas consists of three marine habitats made up of reef flats which house living or dead coral communities, submerged rock slabs, and some seagrass areas. Terre de Haut has coral reefs with diverse communities, invested with large corals (Acropora palmata). The coral reef between the two islets gives protection to the lagoon where juvenile fish species thrive.

== History ==
According to archaeological findings of pottery and other debris from the two islands, it is concluded that they were occupied between 600 and 1500 AD. In the later part of the 18th century, cotton planters and their slaves lived here. Census records of 1858 show that 28 people lived on the island and were engaged in farming of crops and vegetables such as cassava, sweet potatoes, yams, corn, peas, pumpkins, and watermelons. They also raised cattle and ran fishing operations. In 1947, the islands were abandoned. The last inhabitant to leave the island was the lighthouse keeper who left in 1974. It was only in 1994 that the Conservatoire du Littoral made the two islets central to their activity and later decreed the Biotope Protection Order as a reserve. Since 2002, the operation and maintenance of the reserve has been part of the activities of the Association désiradienne Ti Te.

== Flora ==
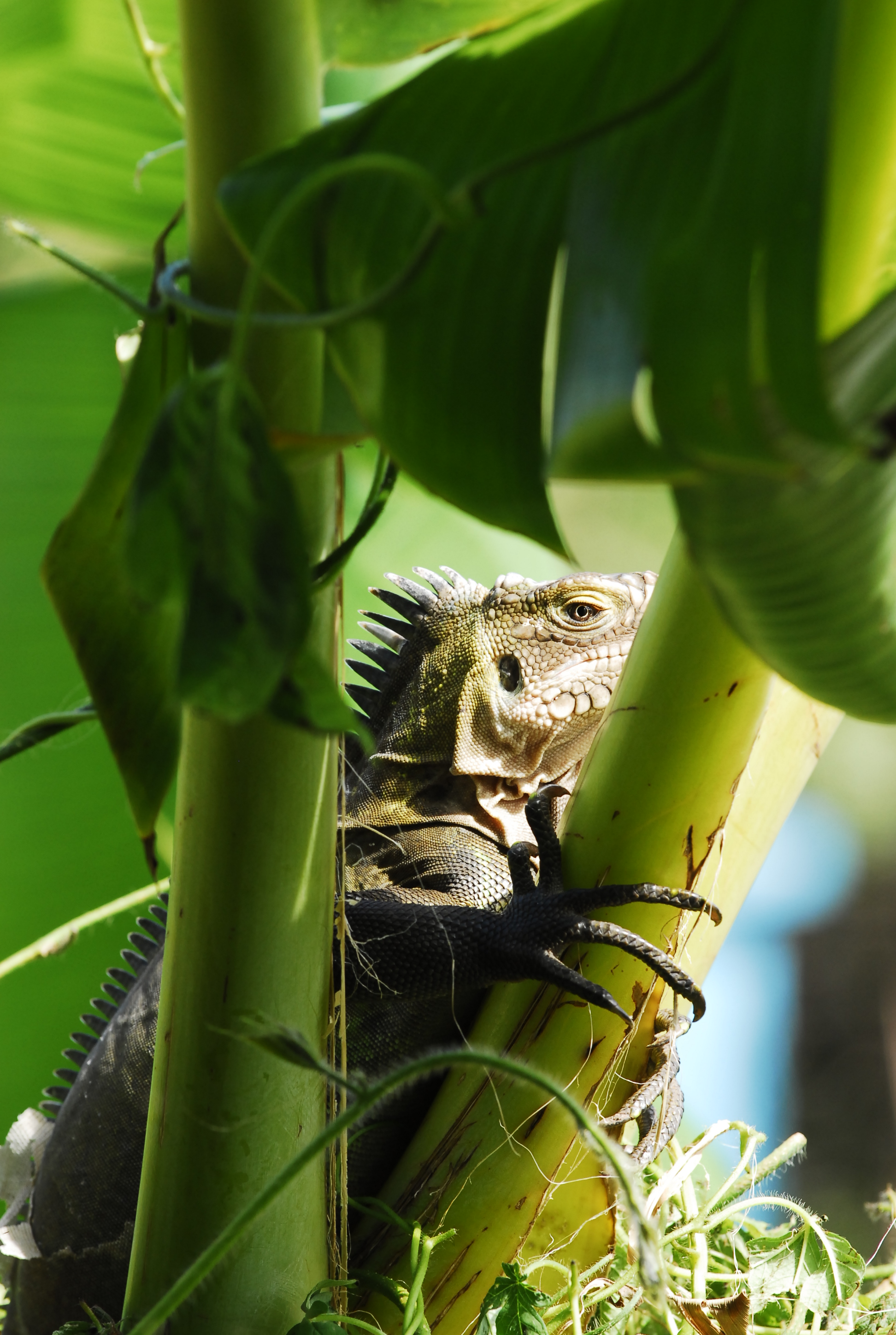
Lesser Antillean Iguana (Iguana delicatissima)

The flora species are limited due to inadequate fresh water source, dry climate and low soil water holding capacity. The species reported in the limestone areas are composed of guaiac, mapous, pear trees, and gum trees. In the coastal belt in sandy areas or in areas subject to frequent flooding, the vegetation types are mangroves, sea grapes, and mancenilliers. The endemic Agave karatto of the Lesser Antilles is found near the lighthouse.

== Fauna ==
In the coral reefs lagoon of Terre de Haut, juvenile fishes thrive. Other fish species recorded here are black surgeon (Acantharus bahianus), colas (Ocyurus chrysurus), the fin-tail cardinal (Holocentrus rufus). Marine Mammal species recorded are bottlenose dolphin (Tursiops truncatus) and Humpback whale (Megaptera novaenglia).

The reserve's land species endemic to the islands is Lesser Antillean Iguana, a protected species; the population is estimated here to be approximately 9,500.

Bird Life International has identified the reserve as an Important Bird Area (IBA) bird reserve. In the forest habitat of Basse-Terre, the IBA-identified species reported are: Least tern (Sterna antillarum), Purple-throated carib (Eulampis jugularis), Green-throated carib (Eulampis holosericeus), Antillean crested hummingbird (Orthorhyncus cristatus), Caribbean elaenia (Elaenia martinica), Scaly-breasted thrasher (Margarops fuscus), and Pearly-eyed thrasher (Margarops fuscatu). Ruddy turnstone (Arenaria interpres) and sandpipers are also reported.
