= La Désirade National Nature Reserve =

Reserve in Désirade Island in Guadeloupe

- IUCN category IV (habitat/species management area)
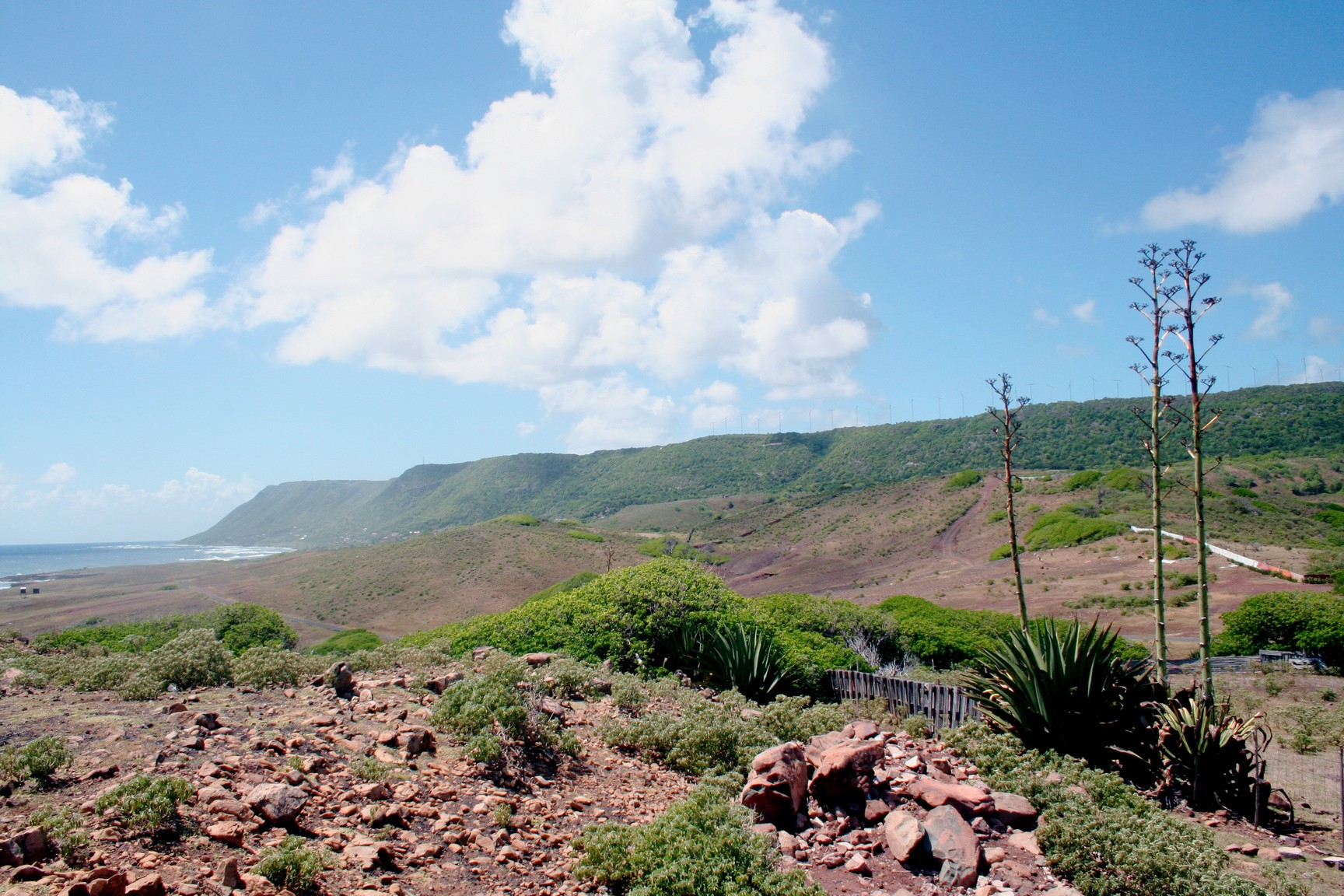
- Tip of Désirade Island

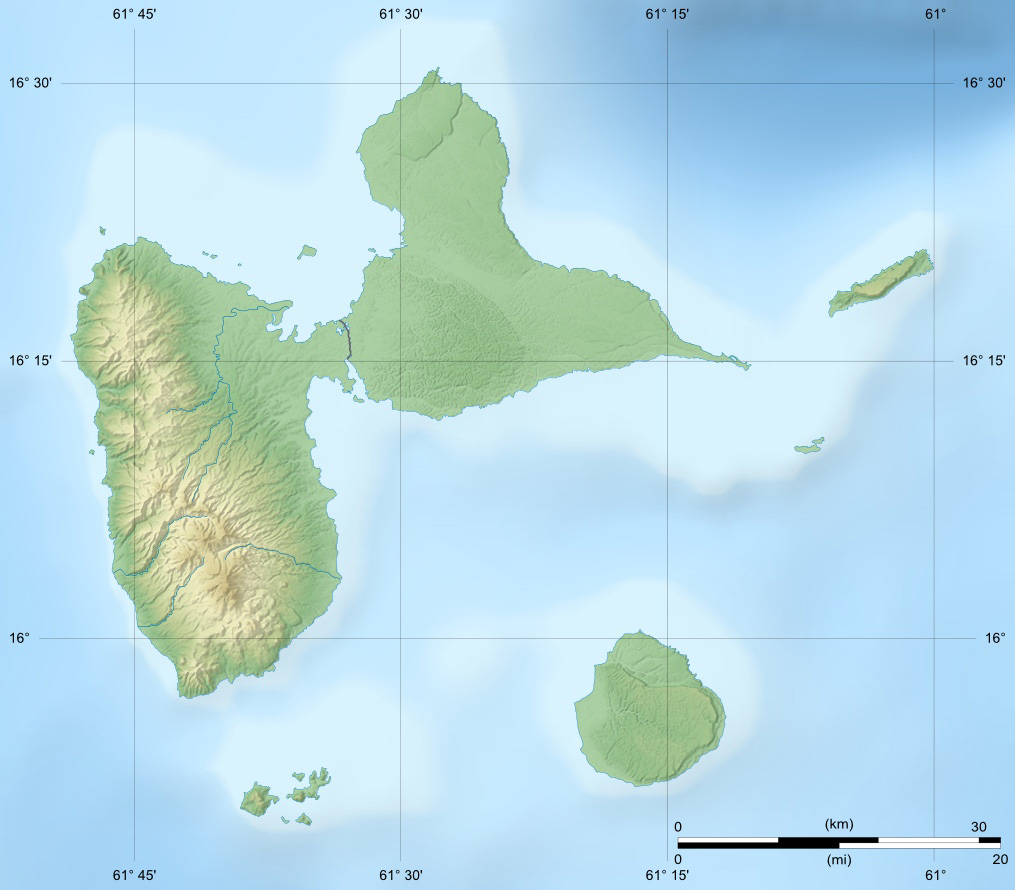
- Location within Guadeloupe
- Location: Desirade Island, Guadeloupe
- Nearest city: Desirade
- Coordinates: 16°20′21″N 61°00′30″W
- Area: 62 ha (153 acres)
- Established: 19 July 2011

La Désirade National Nature Reserve (French: Réserve naturelle nationale de La Désirade) is a reserve in Désirade Island in Guadeloupe. Established under the Ministerial Decree No. 2011-853 of 19 July 2011 for its special geological features it has an area of 62 ha (153 acres). The reserve represents the geological heritage of the Caribbean tectonic plate, with a wide spectrum of rock formations, the outcrops of volcanic activity being remnants of the sea level oscillations. It is one of thirty three geosites of Guadeloupe.

There is a large population of Lesser Antillean Iguana (Iguana delicatissima) and red crabs in the reserve.

== Location ==
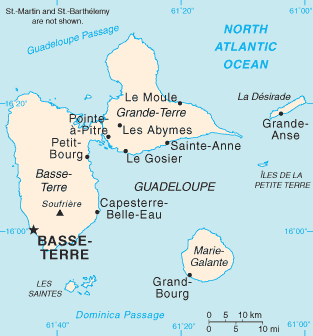

The reserve, with an officially designated area of 62 ha (153 acres), is in the eastern part of the island of Desirade which covers an area of 22 square kilometres (8.5 sq mi). It is to the east of Grande-Terre in the Guadeloupe archipelago.

== Features ==
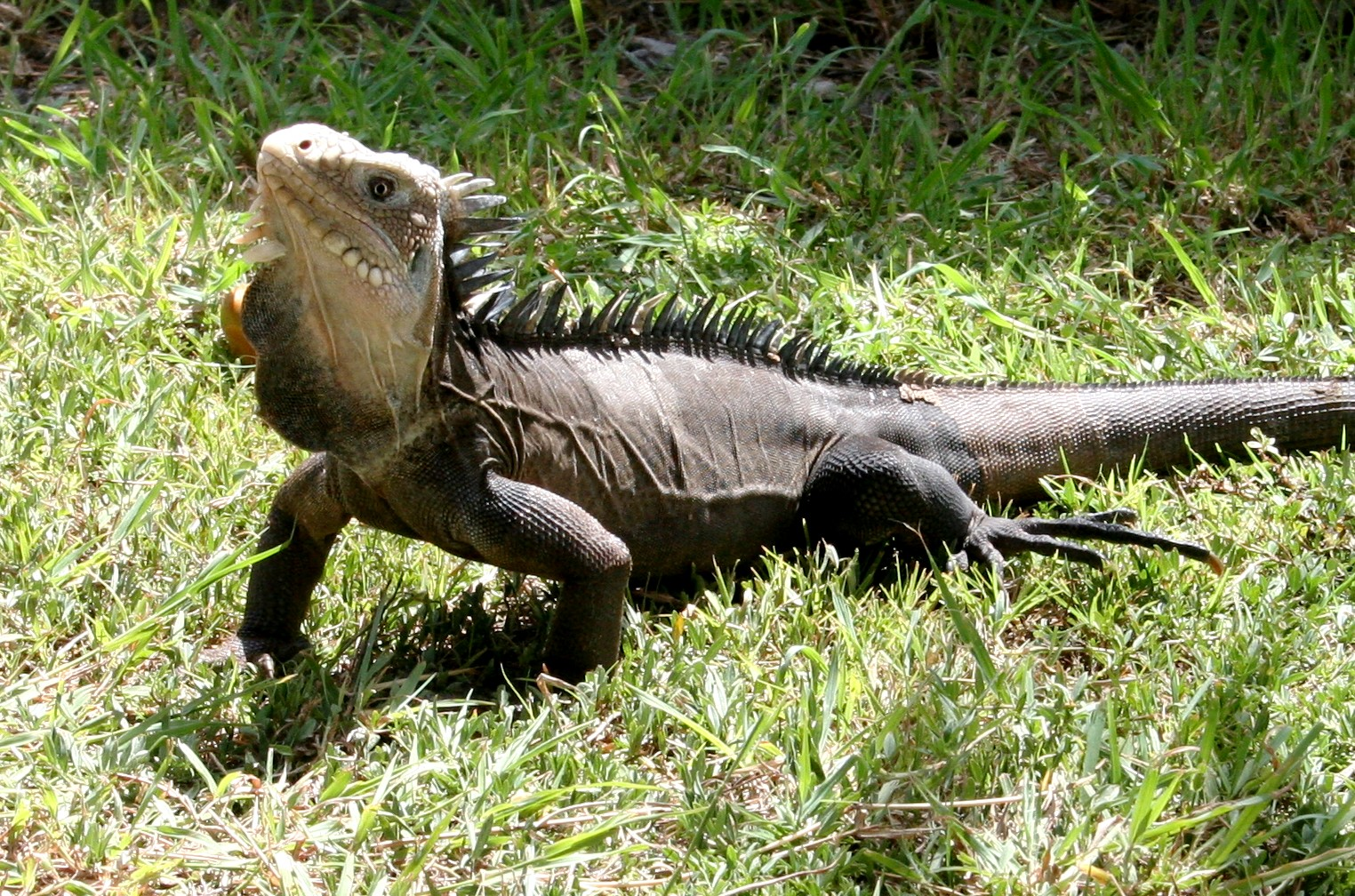
Lesser Antillean Iguana

The reserve exhibits surface features which are considered the earliest phase of the geological history of the Lesser Antilles. Geological formations consists of basalt flows or pillow lavas with radiolarites which represent underwater volcanic activity. Radiolarites are intercalated with thin beds of siliceous sedimentary rocks in laminated forms, in colours of red, brown and green. It is also reported that these formations are a result of the accumulation of shells in deep ocean areas. Paleontologists have identified the micro-fossils contained in the radiolarian species as typical of Tithonian floor which represents the top layer of the Jurassic system dated to 145 - 150 million years ago.

Apart from its geological features, the reserve is home for Xerophyte plant life comprising many plant species. Animal species are also noted in the reserve. The endemic animal species recorded are Skink Désirade, the Gaïac, and Iguana Lesser Antilles (Iguana delicatissima). There are also few Green Iguana (Iguana iguana), considered an invasive species which needs to be excluded from the reserve.

== Conservation ==
An advisory committee has been set up for the conservation and preservation of this reserve. This task is entrusted to the Titus Association and National Forest Department. The basic objective is to ensure maintenance of the biodiversity and conserving the many marine, terrestrial and geological outcrops of the reserve, apart from protecting the plant and wildlife.

=== IUGS geological heritage site ===
In respect of it being 'the oldest witness of back-arc spreading idge of the eastern Caribbean plate', the International Union of Geological Sciences (IUGS) included the 'Upper Jurassic ophiolitic sequence in La Désirade Island' in its assemblage of 100 'geological heritage sites' around the world in a listing published in October 2022. The organisation defines an IUGS Geological Heritage Site as 'a key place with geological elements and/or processes of international scientific relevance, used as a reference, and/or with a substantial contribution to the development of geological sciences through history.'
