= West Indian iguana =

West Indian iguana may refer to:

- The Lesser Antillean Iguana (Iguana delicatissima)
- Members of the genus Cyclura, more commonly called rock iguanas.
