= Petite Terre Islands =

Two uninhabited islands in Guadeloupe

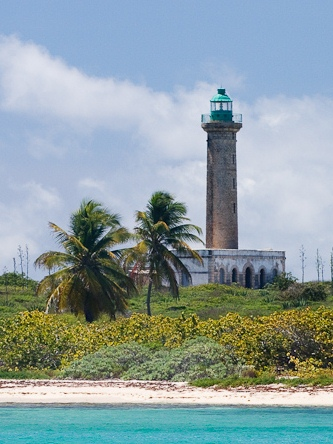
- Location: Petite Terre Islands, La Désirade, Guadeloupe, France
- Coordinates: 16°10′15″N 61°06′33″W

Tower
- Constructed: 1840
- Construction: brick (tower)
- Automated: 1974
- Height: 33 m (108 ft)
- Shape: Cylindrical tower with balcony and lantern atop a 1-storey keeper’s house
- Markings: unpainted (tower), green (lantern)
- Power source: solar power
- Heritage: monument historique inscrit

Light
- Focal height: 26 m (85 ft)
- Range: 15 nmi (28 km; 17 mi)
- Characteristic: Fl(3) W 12s

Petite Terre is also the name of Pamanzi island, Mayotte.

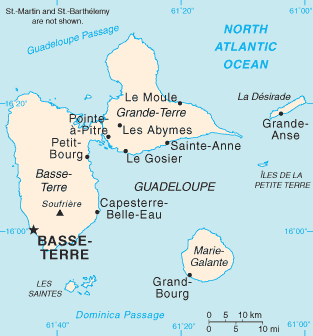
Petite Terre Islands appear about 10 km (6.2 mi) to the south-east of the island of Grande-Terre.

Petite Terre Islands (French: Îles de la Petite-Terre [il də la pətit tɛʁ], literally "Islands of the Small Land") are two small uninhabited islands located about 10 km (6 mi) to the south-east of the island of Grande-Terre (Guadeloupe), in the Lesser Antilles. They are named Petite Terre ("Small Land") in contrast with the much larger Grande-Terre ("Large Land").

The two islands are Terre de Bas island to the southwest and the smaller Terre de Haut island to the northeast. Their combined land area is 1.68 km^{2} (168 hectares). Terre de Bas island (literally "Low Land" or "Down Land") is so named because it is downwind compared to Terre de Haut island ("Upper Land" island) to its northeast, which first meets the trade winds blowing from the north-east in the Caribbean.

Administratively, the Petite Terre Islands are dependent on the commune (municipality) of La Désirade. The two islands and 842 hectares (2,081 acres) of the sea around them were declared a nature reserve, the National Nature Reserve of Îles de la Petite-Terree.

== Fauna and flora ==
The fauna of the two islands is essentially composed of Lesser Antillean iguana with 9,500 individuals, migratory birds and sea turtles previously hunted for their eggs, their fat and their shells. Beliefs even lend aphrodisiac virtues to the turtles' penises. The richness of the fauna is completed by a great variety of fish species and larvae protected from the swell by the lagoon and the coral reef. The island of Terre-de-Bas also hosts an endemic species of scorpion, the Oiclus.

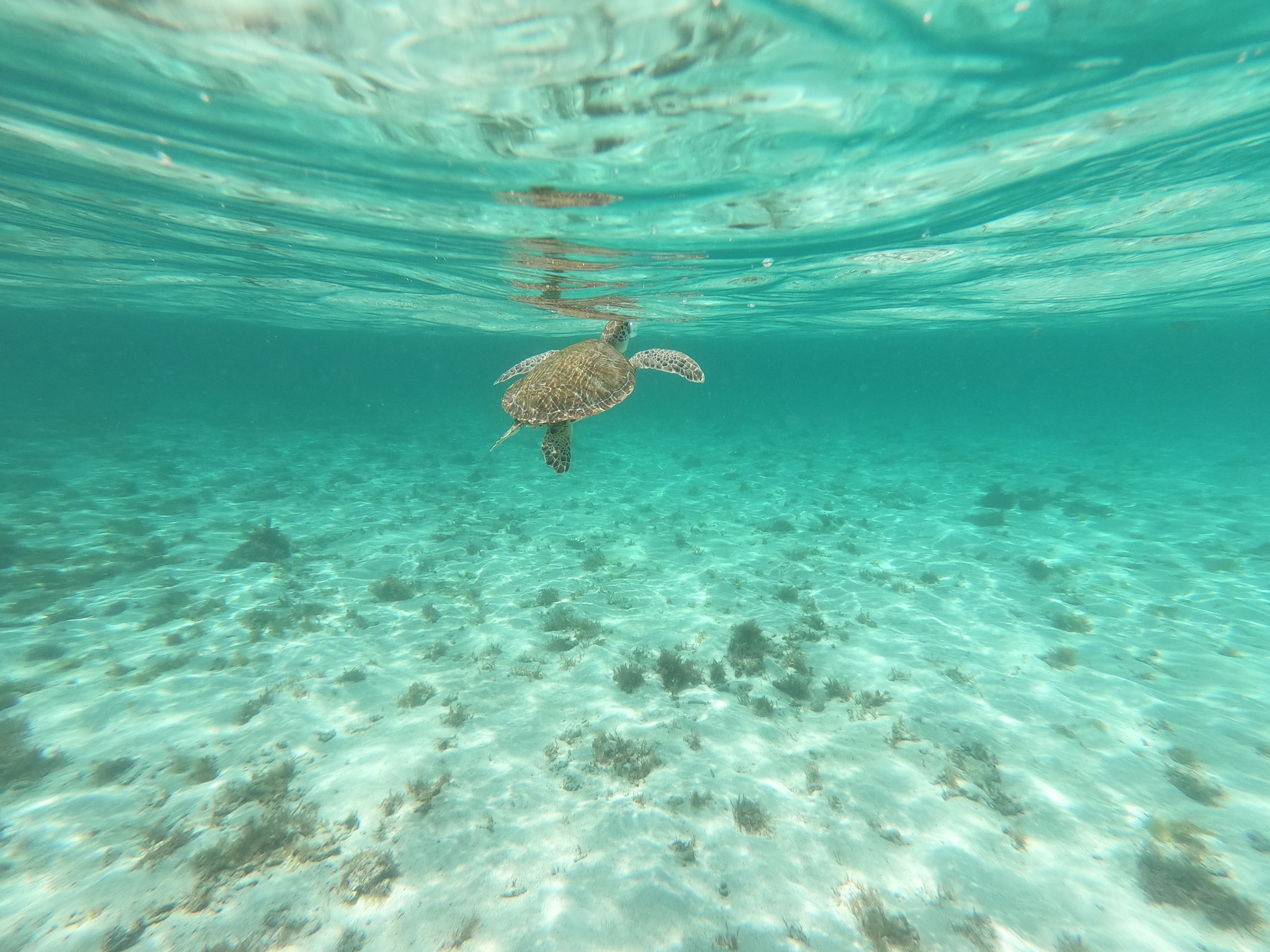
Green turtle

At the same time, the flora is very abundant and, for example, the guaiac tree - a protected species that has practically disappeared from the Lesser Antilles -, which was once used to make billiard balls and pulleys, and the agave, which blooms only once in its life, are protected species. Thus, for ecological reasons, to regulate the influx of tourists and for better conservation of this fauna and flora, the islands of Petite-Terre have been classified as a nature reserve since September 1998, with an extension to the 842-hectare marine area surrounding the two islets

== See also ==
- List of lighthouses in Guadeloupe
