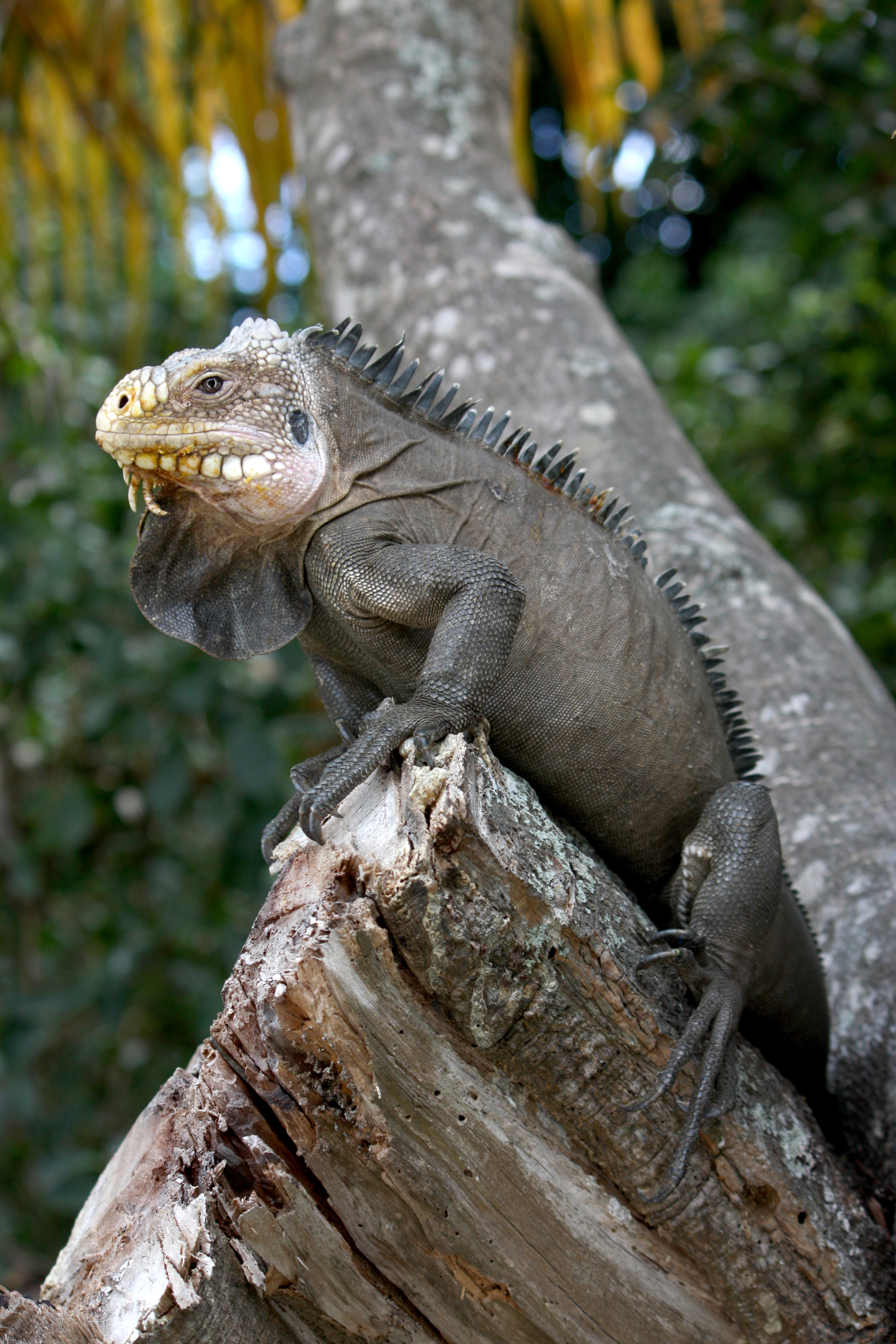
- A Lesser Antillean iguana in Coulibistrie, Dominica

Conservation status
- Critically Endangered (IUCN 3.1)
- CITES Appendix II

Scientific classification
- Kingdom: Animalia
- Phylum: Chordata
- Class: Reptilia
- Order: Squamata
- Suborder: Iguania
- Family: Iguanidae
- Genus: Iguana
- Species: I. delicatissima

Binomial name
- Iguana delicatissima Laurenti, 1768
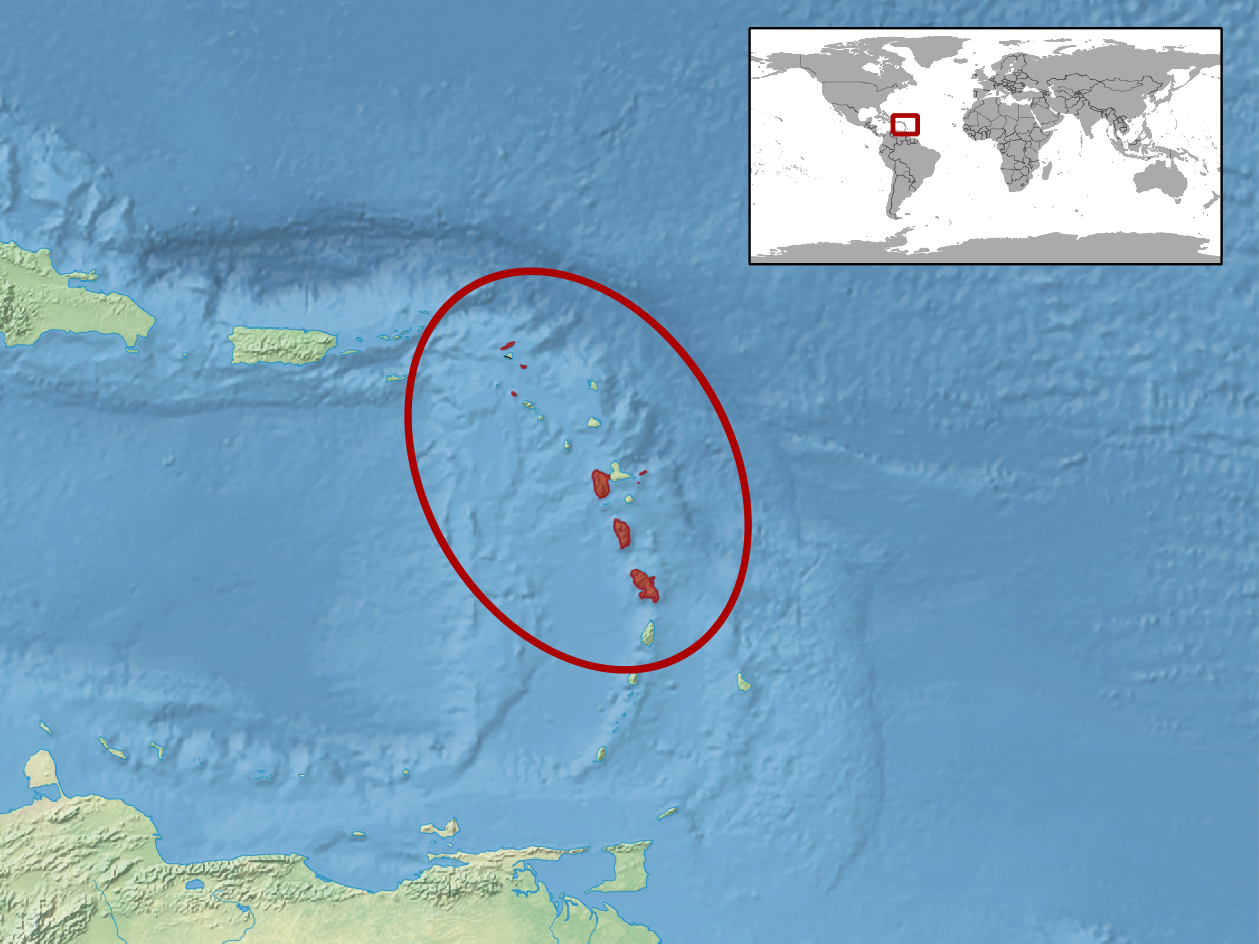

= Lesser Antillean iguana =

Species of reptile

The Lesser Antillean iguana (Iguana delicatissima) is a large arboreal lizard endemic to the Lesser Antilles. It is one of two species of lizard of the genus Iguana and is in severe decline due to habitat destruction, introduced feral predators, hunting, and hybridization with its introduced sister species, the green iguana (Iguana iguana).

Other common names for it are Lesser Antillean green iguana or West Indian iguana.

== Etymology and taxonomy ==
The generic name iguana is derived from iwana, a Spanish form of the Taino name for the species. Its specific name delicatissima is Latin for "delicate". The species was first officially described by Austrian naturalist Josephus Nicolaus Laurenti in 1768.

== Anatomy and morphology ==
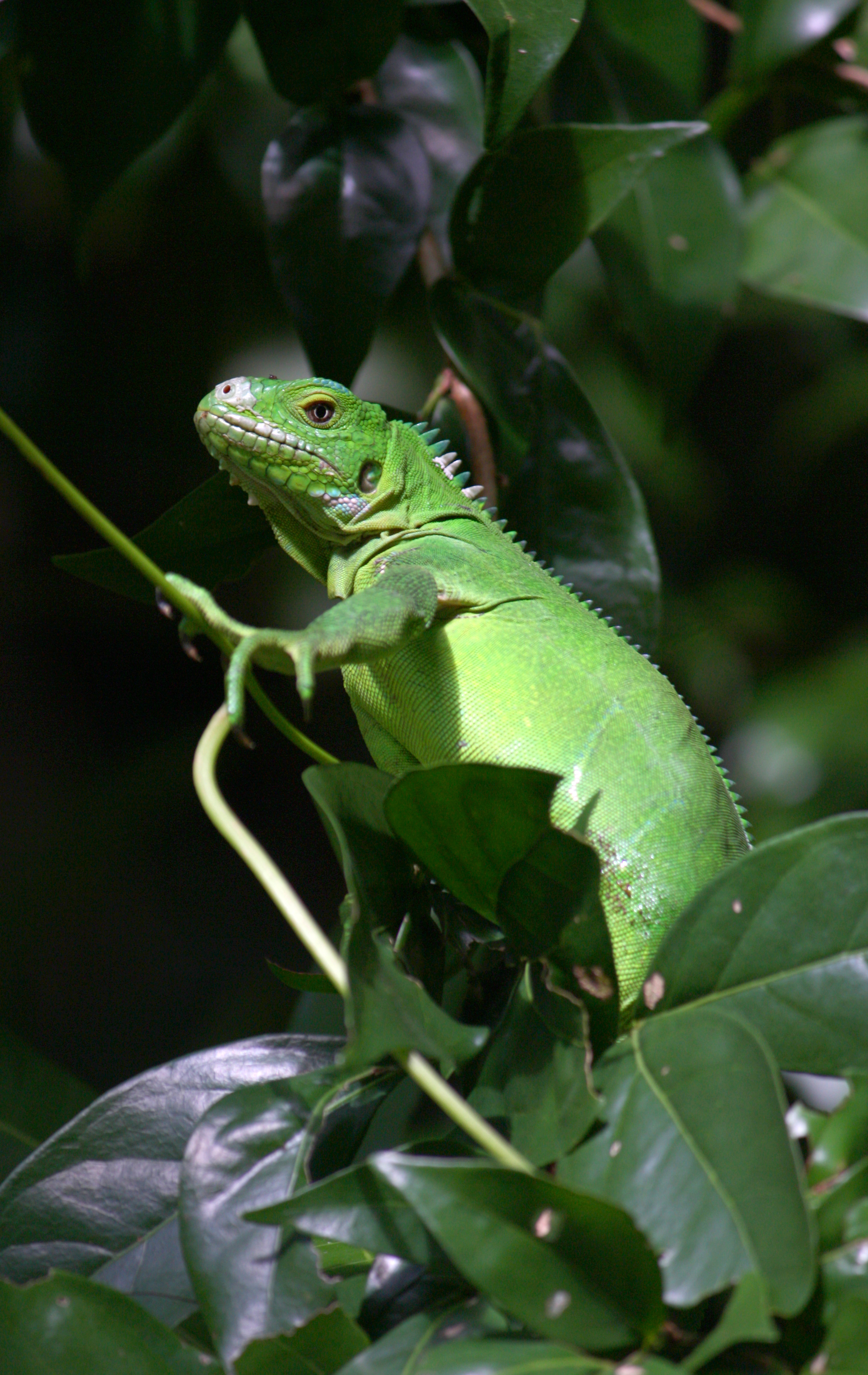
A juvenile Lesser Antillean iguana near the Coulibistrie River, Dominica

The Lesser Antilles iguana has a more blocky, shortened face than the green iguana and lacks the distinctive stripe pattern present along the green iguana's tail. The features that most easily distinguish these two species are the large, round scale below each ear as well as a striped tail which are both present in the green iguana but which the Lesser Antillean iguana lack. Recently, an assessment of morphometric and scale characteristics between green iguanas and the Lesser Antillean iguana showed another 13 characters that are different between both species, with green iguanas having relatively longer tails.

The Lesser Antillean iguana varies in color between different island populations, but the base color tends to be gray, with green splotching on the underside. They have large pale, ivory colored scales on their heads. The jowls of males are pink and the scales around the eyes are blue. Males also have femoral pores along each inner thigh that exude pheromones during breeding season; males on St. Eustatius have between 18–22 pores. Males are larger than females and can grow up to 43.4 cm (17 in) long, with an 80 cm (31.5 in) tail when full-grown. Females can grow to approximately 38.5 cm (15 in), and can lay up to 30 eggs.

== Habitat and distribution ==
The Lesser Antillean iguana is found in scrub woodlands, rainforests, and mangroves throughout the Lesser Antilles on Saint Barth, Anguilla, St. Eustatius, Guadeloupe, Dominica, and Martinique. Since European settlement the species has disappeared from Sint Maarten, Saint Kitts, Nevis, Barbuda, Antigua, Marie Galante, and Îles des Saintes. The exact reasons for their disappearance differs on each island.

== Ecology ==
Lesser Antillean iguanas are primarily herbivores, feeding on leaves, flowers, seeds, fruit, and growing shoots of upwards of 100 different species of plant. They are known to consume manchineel (Hippomane mancinella), a tree species that produces chemicals that are toxic to mammals and birds. During the wet season (August to December), they consume leaves from various plants and also eat fruits from multiple plant species, including Barbados cherry (Malpighia emarginata) and manchineel. During the dry season (January to May), Lesser Antillean iguanas tend to consume more foliage than fruit. They commonly consume fruits from chink bush (Bourreria succulenta). A study on nests from St. Eustatius showed that inquilines make use of nest tunnels and nest chambers dug by female Lesser Antillean iguanas, suggesting that this species should be considered as an ecosystem engineer.

== Conservation ==
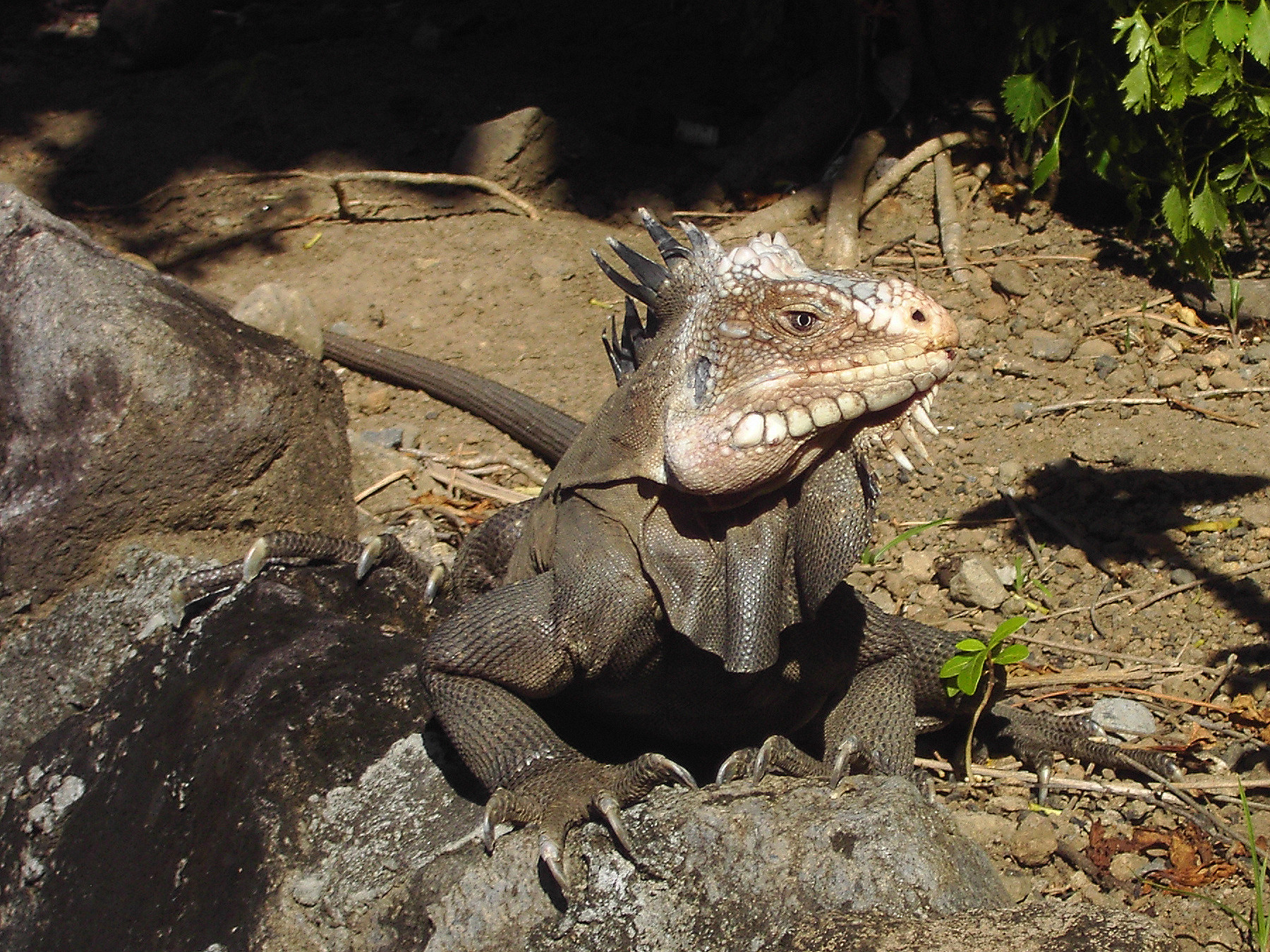
A Lesser Antillean iguana in Dominica

The Lesser Antillean iguana is a critically endangered and is on the IUCN Red List. While the Lesser Antillean iguana is legally protected from hunting throughout its range, but enforcement of these regulations is extremely difficult and therefore limited. Other threats include habitat loss to agriculture and human development, as well as the introduction of feral predators such as dogs, cats, and mongooses.

Another major threat comes from the green iguana. The green iguana has been introduced to the Lesser Antilles as an invasive species and directly competes with the Lesser Antillean iguana for food and resources. In addition, the green iguana has hybridized with the Lesser Antillean iguana, which has been the biggest reason for the latter species' decline on numerous islands (Basse Terre and Grande Terre (Guadeloupe), St. Barthélemy, Martinique) or complete disappearance (e.g., Les Iles des Saintes). Hybridization has also been observed on St. Eustatius. After a group of green iguanas washed ashore after Hurricane Luis in 1995 on the island of Anguilla, the endemic Lesser Antillean iguana population was gone within twenty years. Recently, non-native iguanas also arrived on Dominica, the last major stronghold of the species. These iguanas were translocated together with hurricane-aid supplies during the aftermath of Hurricane Maria in 2017.

Captive Lesser Antillean iguanas are currently kept at the Durrell Wildlife Conservation Trust, the Chester Zoo, the Memphis Zoo, and the San Diego Zoo's Center for Reproduction of Endangered Species. All individuals originate from the Commonwealth of Dominica. Maintaining and breeding the species in captivity is difficult. Mating and egg laying have occurred at each institution, but most eggs have been infertile. However, a single individual was successfully hatched at the Durrell Wildlife Conservation Trust in 1997 and in 2000 eight iguanas were hatched. Following these successes, eleven iguanas were hatched at Durrell in 2016. These individuals will be sent to zoos across Europe in an effort to promote and support conservation for the species. In 2018 four captured iguanas from Sint Eustatius were sent to Blijdorp zoo in Rotterdam, the Netherlands for a breeding programme.

In 2024, the Lesser Antillean iguana was moved from Appendix III to Appendix II of the SPAW Protocol (Specially Protected Areas and Wildlife Protocol), an amended protocol to the Convention for the Protection and Development of the Marine Environment of the Wider Caribbean Region. This change in status increases the species' regional protections, which include prohibitions on taking, possession or killing the iguanas, as well as disturbing them in the wild, particularly during periods of breeding, incubation, estivation or migration.
