= List of airports in the United Kingdom and Crown Dependencies =

Locations of UK and Crown Dependency airports with commercial airline services. Bold indicates international airports.

This list of airports in the United Kingdom and Crown Dependencies is a partial list of public active aerodromes (airports and airfields) in the UK and the British Crown Dependencies. Most private airfields are not listed.

The ICAO codes for airports in the United Kingdom (and its Crown Dependencies) begin with the two letters "EG". RAF Mount Pleasant on the Falkland Islands also uses the "EG" code.

Airport names in italics are listed in the UK Aeronautical Information Publication. Airport names in bold have scheduled commercial airline service(s). Runway information is for the longest runway when more than one is available.

== Airports in England ==
Location	County	ICAO	IATA	Airport name	Usage	Rwy length		Surface	Elevation (m)
Location	County	ICAO	IATA	Airport name	Usage	(m)	(ft)	Surface	Elevation (m)
East Midlands
Brackley	Northamptonshire	EG2A		Hinton-in-the-Hedges Airfield	Private	700	2,297	Asphalt	
Brackley	Northamptonshire	EGBT	QGT	Turweston Aerodrome	Public	915	3,002	Asphalt	
Bruntingthorpe	Leicestershire	EG74	LHB	Bruntingthorpe Aerodrome	Private	3000	9,842	Asphalt	
Castle Donington	Leicestershire	EGNX	EMA	**East Midlands Airport**	Public	2,893	9,491	Asphalt	93
Coningsby	Lincolnshire	EGXC	QCY	RAF Coningsby	Military	2,744	9,003	Concrete	
Cranwell	Lincolnshire	EGYD	QKY	RAF Cranwell	Military	2,082	6,831	Asphalt	
Derby	Derbyshire	EGBD		Derby Airfield	Public	602	1,975	Grass	
Grantham	Lincolnshire	EGYE		RAF Barkston Heath	Military	1,831	6,007	Asphalt	
Kettering	Northamptonshire			Deenethorpe Aerodrome	Private	1,200	3,937	Asphalt	
Leicester	Leicestershire	EGBG	QUL	Leicester Airport	Public	940	3,084	Asphalt	
Lincoln	Lincolnshire	EGCS		Sturgate Airfield	Public	820	2,690	Paved	
Lincoln	Lincolnshire	EGNW		Wickenby Aerodrome	Public	530	1,739	Concrete	
Newark-on-Trent	Nottinghamshire	EGXY		RAF Syerston	Military	1,827	5,994	Asphalt	
Retford	Nottinghamshire	EGNE	QKR	Retford Gamston Airport	Public	1,683	5,522	Asphalt	
Silverstone	Northamptonshire	EGBV		Silverstone Heliport	Public	450	1,476	Grass	
Spalding	Lincolnshire	EGCL		Fenland Airfield	Public	594	1,949	Grass	
Stamford	Lincolnshire	EGXT	QKX	RAF Wittering	Military	2,759	9,052	Asphalt	
Strubby	Lincolnshire	EGCG		Strubby Airfield	Public	750	2,461	Paved	
Sywell	Northamptonshire	EGBK	ORM	Sywell Aerodrome	Private	909	2,982	Grass	
Tollerton	Nottinghamshire	EGBN	NQT	Nottingham Airport	Private	1,050	3,445	Asphalt/concrete	
Waddington	Lincolnshire	EGXW	WTN	RAF Waddington	Military	2,743	9,000	Asphalt	
Worksop	Nottinghamshire	EGNF		Netherthorpe Airfield	Public	553	1,814	Grass	
East of England
Aldenham	Hertfordshire	EGTR		Elstree Aerodrome	Public	651	2,136	Asphalt	
Saffron Walden	Essex	EGO2		Audley End Airfield	Private	752	2,467	Grass	
Beccles	Suffolk	EGSM		Beccles Airfield	Public	696	2,283	Concrete/grass	
Bedford	Bedfordshire	EGBF		Bedford Aerodrome	Private	1,095	3,593	Concrete	
Bedford	Bedfordshire	EGSB		~~Castle Mill Airfield~~	Private	183	600	Grass	
Bourn	Cambridgeshire	EGSN		Bourn Airfield	Private	633	2,077	Bitumen	
Braintree	Essex	EGSL		Andrewsfield Aerodrome	Private	790	2,592	Grass	
Fowlmere	Cambridgeshire	EGMA		Fowlmere Airfield	Public	700	2,297	Grass	
Cambridge	Cambridgeshire	EGSC	CBG	Cambridge City Airport	Public	1,965	6,446	Concrete	15
Clacton-on-Sea	Essex	EGSQ		Clacton Airport	Public	610	2,001	Grass	
Cranfield	Bedfordshire	EGTC		Cranfield Airport	Private	1,799	5,902	Asphalt	
Cromer	Norfolk			Northrepps Aerodrome	Private	615	2,018	Grass	
Duxford	Cambridgeshire	EGSU	QFO	Duxford Aerodrome	Public	1,503	4,931	Paved	
Great Yarmouth	Norfolk	EGSD		Great Yarmouth - North Denes Airport	Private	480	1,575	Grass	
Halstead	Essex	EGSR	QGR	Earls Colne Airfield	Public	939	3,081	Grass/asphalt	
Henlow	Bedfordshire	EGWE		RAF Henlow	Military	1,199	3,934	Grass	
Honington	Suffolk	EGXH	BEQ	RAF Honington	Military	2,743	9,000	Concrete	
Ipswich	Suffolk	EGSO		Crowfield Airfield	Private	733	2,404	Grass	
Ipswich	Suffolk	EGST		Elmsett Airfield	Private	890	2,920	Grass	
Lakenheath	Suffolk	EGUL	LKZ	RAF Lakenheath	Military	2,743	9,000	Concrete/asphalt	
Luton	Bedfordshire	EGGW	LTN	**Luton Airport**	Public	2,160	7,086	Asphalt	160
Marham	Norfolk	EGYM	KNF	RAF Marham	Military	2,786	9,140	Concrete	
Mildenhall	Suffolk	EGUN	MHZ	RAF Mildenhall	Military	2,810	9,221	Concrete/asphalt	
North Weald	Essex	EGSX	QKN	North Weald Airfield	Public	1,930	6,332	Asphalt	
Norwich	Norfolk	EGSH	NWI	**Norwich Airport**	Public	1,840	6,040	Asphalt/concrete	36
Norwich	Norfolk	EGSJ		Seething Airfield	Public	800	2,625	Asphalt	
Norwich	Norfolk	EGSV		Old Buckenham Airfield	Public	800	2,625	Asphalt	
Norwich	Norfolk	EGYC	CLF	RAF Coltishall	Military	2,286	7,500	Asphalt	
Old Warden	Bedfordshire	EGTH		Shuttleworth (Old Warden) Aerodrome	Private	628	2,060	Grass	
Peterborough	Cambridgeshire	EGSF		Peterborough Business Airport	Private	987	3,238	Asphalt	
Peterborough	Cambridgeshire	EGSP		Peterborough/Sibson Airfield	Public	935	3,068	Grass	
Shipdham	Norfolk	EGSA		Shipdham Airfield	Private	905	2,969	Concrete	
St Ives	Cambridgeshire	EGUY	QUY	RAF Wyton	Military	2,507	8,225	Asphalt	
St Neots	Cambridgeshire	EGMJ		Little Gransden Airfield	Public	570	1,870	Grass	
Southend	Essex	EGMC	SEN	**London Southend Airport**	Public	1,856	6,089	Asphalt	17
Stansted Mountfitchet	Essex	EGSS	STN	**London Stansted Airport**	Public	3,048	10,000	Asphalt	106
Stapleford Tawney	Essex	EGSG	QGS	Stapleford Aerodrome	Public	1,077	3,533	Grass/asphalt	
Stowmarket	Suffolk	EGUW		Wattisham Flying Station	Military	2,424	7,953	Asphalt	
Thetford	Norfolk	EGXH	BEQ	RAF Honington	Military	2,747	9,012	Asphalt	
Greater London
Bromley	Greater London	EGKB	BQH	London Biggin Hill Airport	Public	1,802	5,912	Tarmac	
Havering	Greater London	EGML		Damyns Hall Aerodrome	Private	599	1,965	Grass	
Hillingdon	Greater London	EGLL	LHR	**Heathrow Airport**	Public	3,901	12,799	Asphalt	25
Hillingdon	Greater London	EGWU	NHT	RAF Northolt	Military	1,690	5,545	Asphalt	
Newham	Greater London	EGLC	LCY	**London City Airport**	Public	1,508	4,948	Concrete	6
Wandsworth	Greater London	EGLW		London Heliport	Public	39	125	Concrete	
North East England
Alnwick	Northumberland	EGQM		RAF Boulmer	Military				
Bockenfield	Northumberland			Eshott Airfield	Public			Asphalt	
Bishop Middleham	County Durham	GB-0002		Fishburn Airfield	public			Grass	
Darlington	County Durham	EGNV	MME	**Teesside International Airport**	Public	2,291	7,516	Asphalt	37
Shotton Colliery	County Durham	GB-0245		Shotton Airfield/Peterlee Parachute Centre	Public			Grass/tarmac	
Woolsington	Tyne and Wear	EGNT	NCL	**Newcastle International Airport**	Public	2,330	7,644	Asphalt	81
North West England
Barrow-in-Furness	Cumbria	EGNL	BWF	Barrow/Walney Island Airport	Public	1,014	3,327	Asphalt	
Blackpool	Lancashire	EGNH	BLK	Blackpool Airport	Private	1,868	6,129	Asphalt	10
Carlisle	Cumbria	EGNC	CAX	Carlisle Lake District Airport	Public	1,837	6,027	Asphalt	58
Eccles	Greater Manchester	EGCB	QGC	Manchester Barton Aerodrome	Public	621	2,037	Grass	78
Formby	Merseyside	EGOW		RAF Woodvale	Military	1,647	5,405	Asphalt	
Liverpool	Merseyside	EGGP	LPL	**Liverpool John Lennon Airport**	Public	2,286	7,500	Asphalt	24
Warton	Lancashire	EGNO	WRT	Warton Aerodrome	Private	2,422	7,946	Asphalt	
Ringway	Greater Manchester	EGCC	MAN	**Manchester Airport**	Public	3,050	10,007	Concrete/asphalt	
South East England
Abingdon	Oxfordshire	EGUD		RAF Abingdon	Military	1,802	5,912	Asphalt	
Andover	Hampshire	EGHO	QGO	Thruxton Aerodrome	Public	770	2,526	Asphalt	
Andover	Hampshire	EGVP		Middle Wallop Flying Station	Military	1,169	3,835	Grass	
Ascot Racecourse	Berkshire	EGLT		Ascot Racecourse Heliport	Public	800	2,625	Grass	
Bembridge	Isle of Wight	EGHJ	BBP	Bembridge Airport	Private	837	2,746	Concrete	
Benson	Oxfordshire	EGUB	BEX	RAF Benson	Military	1,825	5,981	Asphalt	
Bicester	Oxfordshire	EGDD		Bicester Airfield	Private	1,100	3,609	Grass	
Brize Norton	Oxfordshire	EGVN	BZZ	RAF Brize Norton	Military	3,050	10,007	Asphalt	
Chalgrove	Oxfordshire	EGLJ		Chalgrove Airfield	Private	1,830	6,004	Asphalt	
Challock	Kent	EGKE		Challock Airfield	Private	302	992	Grass	
Chobham	Surrey	EGTF	QKF	Fairoaks Airport	Private	813	2,667	Asphalt	
Crawley	West Sussex	EGKK	LGW	**Gatwick Airport**	Public	3,316	10,879	Asphalt/concrete	62
Denton	Kent			Clipgate Airfield	Private	490	1,607	Grass	
Dunsfold	Surrey	EGTD	QGD	Dunsfold Aerodrome	Private	1,676	5,496	Concrete	
Enstone	Oxfordshire	EGTN		Enstone Airfield	Public	1,100	3,609	Concrete/tarmac	
Farnborough	Hampshire	EGLF	FAB	Farnborough Airport	Private	2,440	8,005	Asphalt	73
Gerrards Cross	Buckinghamshire	EGLD	QKD	Denham Aerodrome	Public	775	2,543	Asphalt	
Goodwood Racecourse	West Sussex	EGKG		Goodwood Racecourse Heliport	Public	500	1,640	Grass	
Hammerwood Park	East Sussex			Hammerwood Helipad	Public	40	130	Grass	
Halton	Buckinghamshire	EGWN		RAF Halton	Military	1,161	3,809	Grass	
High Wycombe	Buckinghamshire	EGTB	HYC	Wycombe Air Park	Public	735	2,411	Asphalt	
Lancing	West Sussex	EGKA	ESH	Shoreham Airport	Public	1,036	3,399	Asphalt	
Lasham	Hampshire	EGHL	QLA	Lasham Airfield	Public	1,797	5,896	Asphalt	
Lydd	Kent	EGMD	LYX	Lydd Airport	Public	1,505	4,938	Asphalt	
Headcorn	Kent	EGKH		Headcorn Aerodrome	Private	840	2,756	Grass	
Manston	Kent	EGMH	MSE	Manston Airport	Public	2,748	9,016	Tarmac	
Nutfield	Surrey	EGKR	KRH	Redhill Aerodrome	Public	897	2,943	Grass	
Odiham	Hampshire	EGVO	ODH	RAF Odiham	Military	1,838	6,030	Asphalt	
Oxford	Oxfordshire	EGTK	OXF	London Oxford Airport	Private	1,552	5,092	Asphalt	80
Popham	Hampshire	EGHP		Popham Airfield	Public	914	3,000	Grass	
Ripe	East Sussex			Kittyhawk Aerodrome	Private	570	1870	Grass	
Rochester	Kent	EGTO	RCS	Rochester Airport	Private	963	3,159	Grass	
Sandown	Isle of Wight	EGHN	QGW	Isle of Wight/Sandown Airport	Public	884	2,900	Grass	
Southampton	Hampshire	EGHI	SOU	**Southampton Airport**	Public	1,723	5,653	Asphalt	13
Westhampnett	West Sussex	EGHR	QUG	Chichester/Goodwood Airfield	Public	1,255	4,117	Grass	
Weston-on-the-Green	Oxfordshire			RAF Weston-on-the-Green	Military	1,140	3,740	Grass	82
White Waltham	Berkshire	EGLM	QGL	White Waltham Airfield	Public	1,006	3,330	Grass	
Yateley	Hampshire	EGLK	BBS	Blackbushe Airport	Public	1,335	4,380	Asphalt	
South West England
Amesbury	Wiltshire	EGDM	QUA	MoD Boscombe Down	Military	3,212	10,538	Concrete/asphalt	
Bodmin	Cornwall	EGLA		Bodmin Aerodrome	Public	610	2,001	Grass	
Braunton	Devon	EGDC		Royal Marines Base Chivenor	Military	1,833	6,014	Asphalt	
Cheltenham Racecourse	Gloucestershire	EGBC		Cheltenham Racecourse Heliport	Public	400	1,312	Grass	
Churchdown	Gloucestershire	EGBJ	GLO	Gloucestershire Airport	Public	1,419	4,656	Asphalt	
Clyst Honiton	Devon	EGTE	EXT	**Exeter Airport**	Public	2,083	6,833	Asphalt	31
Davidstow	Cornwall			RAF Davidstow Moor	Public	610	2000	Asphalt	
Fairford	Gloucestershire	EGVA	FFD	RAF Fairford	Military	3,046	9,994	Asphalt	
Great Torrington	Devon	EGHU		Eaglescott Airfield	Public	600	1,969	Grass	
Helston	Cornwall	EGDR	QKZ	RNAS Culdrose	Military	1,831	6,006	Asphalt	
Henstridge	Somerset	EGHS		Henstridge Airfield	Public				
Honiton	Devon	EGTU	QKU	Dunkeswell Aerodrome	Private	968	3,176	Asphalt	
Hullavington	Wiltshire	EGDV		~~RAF Hullavington~~	Public				
Hurn	Dorset	EGHH	BOH	**Bournemouth Airport**	Public	2,271	7,451	Asphalt	12
Kemble	Gloucestershire	EGBP	GBA	Cotswold Airport	Private	2,008	6,591	Asphalt	
Lyneham	Wiltshire	EGDL	LYE	RAF Lyneham	Military	2,386	7,828	Asphalt	
Mawgan in Pydar	Cornwall	EGHQ	NQY	**Newquay Airport** / RAF St Mawgan	Public	2,745	9,006	Asphalt	119
Mullion	Cornwall	EGDO		RNAS Predannack	Military				
Netheravon	Wiltshire	EGDN		Netheravon Airfield	Military				
Oaksey	Wiltshire	EGTW		Oaksey Park Airfield	Public				
Penzance	Cornwall	EGHK	PZE	**Penzance Heliport**	Public	373	1,224	Grass	
Perranporth	Cornwall	EGTP	QKA	Perranporth Airfield	Public	940	3,084	Asphalt	
Portland Harbour	Dorset	EGDP		Portland Heliport	Military	229	750		
Salisbury	Wiltshire	EGLS		Old Sarum Airfield	Public	781	2,562	Grass	
Shaftesbury	Dorset	EGHA		Compton Abbas Airfield	Private	803	2,635	Grass	
St Just	Cornwall	EGHC	LEQ	**Land's End Airport**	Public	792	2,598	Grass	
St Mary's	Cornwall	EGHE	ISC	**St Mary's Airport**	Public	600	1,969	Asphalt	
Tresco	Cornwall	EGHT	TSO	**Tresco Heliport**	Public	30	98	Grass	
Truro	Cornwall	EGHY		Truro Aerodrome	Public	591	1,739	Grass	
Upavon	Wiltshire	EGDJ	UPV	former RAF Upavon	Military			Grass	
Lulsgate	Bristol	EGGD	BRS	**Bristol Airport**	Public	2,011	6,598	Asphalt	190
Middlezoy	Somerset			Middlezoy Aerodrome; RAF Weston Zoyland	Public	585	1,920	Grass	
Westonzoyland	Somerset			RAF Weston Zoyland	Public			Grass/asphalt	
Wroughton	Wiltshire	EGDT		RAF Wroughton	Military				
Yeovil	Somerset	EGDI	QKI	RNAS Merryfield	Military	1,820	5,970	Asphalt	
Yeovil	Somerset	EGDY	YEO	RNAS Yeovilton	Military	2,310	7,580	Concrete	
Yeovil	Somerset	EGHG		Yeovil Aerodrome	Public	1,386	4,547	Grass	
West Midlands
Albrighton	Shropshire	EGWC		RAF Cosford	Military	1,186	3,890	Asphalt	
Bickenhill	West Midlands	EGBB	BHX	**Birmingham Airport**	Public	3,052	10,013	Asphalt	100
Leominster	Herefordshire	EGBS	QKS	Shobdon Aerodrome	Public	900	2,953	Asphalt	
Shawbury	Shropshire	EGOS	QKO	RAF Shawbury	Military	1,831	6,007	Asphalt/concrete	
Shrewsbury	Shropshire	EGCV	QKV	Sleap Airfield	Public	802	2,631	Asphalt	
Tatenhill	Staffordshire	EGBM	QGM	Tatenhill Airfield	Public	788	2,585	Asphalt	
Ternhill	Shropshire	EGOE		RAF Ternhill	Military	989	3,215	Asphalt	
Wellesbourne	Warwickshire	EGBW	QGB	Wellesbourne Mountford Aerodrome	Private	917	3,009	Asphalt	
Wolverhampton	Staffordshire	EGBO	QKH	Wolverhampton Airport	Public	1,182	3,878	Asphalt	
Yorkshire and the Humber
Bagby	North Yorkshire	EGNG		Bagby Airfield	Private	640	2,100	Grass	
Beverley	East Riding of Yorkshire	EGNY		Beverley/Linley Hill Airfield	Public	635	2,083	Grass	
Brough	East Riding of Yorkshire	EGNB		Brough Aerodrome	Private	1,054	3,458	Asphalt	
Breighton	North Yorkshire	EGBR		Breighton Aerodrome	Private	850	2,790	Grass	
Church Fenton	North Yorkshire	EGCM	QKM	Leeds East Airport	Private	1,877	6,158	Asphalt	
Dishforth	North Yorkshire	EGXD		RAF Dishforth	Military	1,858	6,096	Asphalt	
Finningley	South Yorkshire	EGCN	DSA	Doncaster Sheffield Airport	Public	2,893	9,491	Asphalt	17
Huddersfield	West Yorkshire	EGND		Crosland Moor Airfield	Private	700	2,296	Asphalt/grass	
Kirmington	North Lincolnshire	EGNJ	HUY	**Humberside Airport**	Public	2,196	7,205	Asphalt/concrete	37
Leconfield	East Riding of Yorkshire			RAF Leconfield	Military				
Leeds	West Yorkshire	EGNM	LBA	**Leeds Bradford Airport**	Public	2,250	7,382	Concrete	208
Leeds	West Yorkshire	EGNP		Leeds Heliport	Private	13	43	Concrete	
Leeming Bar	North Yorkshire	EGXE	QKG	RAF Leeming	Military	2,292	7,520	Asphalt	
Linton-on-Ouse	North Yorkshire	EGXU	HRT	RAF Linton-on-Ouse	Military	1,835	6,020	Asphalt	
Scunthorpe, North Lincolnshire	Lincolnshire	EGCF		Sandtoft Airfield	Public	886	2,907	Asphalt	
Sherburn-in-Elmet	North Yorkshire	EGCJ		Sherburn-in-Elmet Airfield	Public	830	2,723	Tarmac	
Topcliffe	North Yorkshire	EGXZ		RAF Topcliffe	Military	1,834	5,951	Asphalt	
York	North Yorkshire	EGNU		Full Sutton Airfield	Public	772	2,533	Grass	
York	North Yorkshire	EGYK		Elvington Airfield	Public	3,094	10,151	Asphalt/concrete	

== Airports in Northern Ireland ==
Location	County	ICAO	IATA	Airport name	Usage	Rwy length		Surface	Elevation (m)
Location	County	ICAO	IATA	Airport name	Usage	(m)	(ft)	Surface	Elevation (m)
Aldergrove	County Antrim	EGAA	BFS	**Belfast International Airport**	Public	2,780	9,121	Asphalt	82
Belfast	County Down	EGAC	BHD	**Belfast City Airport**	Public	1,829	6,001	Asphalt	5
Eglinton	County Londonderry	EGAE	LDY	**City of Derry Airport**	Public	1,967	6,453	Asphalt	7
Enniskillen	County Fermanagh	EGAB	ENK	Enniskillen/St Angelo Airport	Private	1,326	4,350	Asphalt	47
Newtownards	County Down	EGAD	QGA	Newtownards Airport	Public	794	2,605	Asphalt	3

== Airports in Scotland ==
Location	Council area	ICAO	IATA	Airport name	Usage	Rwy length		Surface	Elevation (m)
Location	Council area	ICAO	IATA	Airport name	Usage	(m)	(ft)	Surface	Elevation (m)
Aberdeen	Aberdeen	EGPD	ABZ	**Aberdeen Airport**	Public	1,953	6,407	Asphalt	66
Ardchattan and Muckairn	Argyll and Bute	EGEO	OBN	**Oban Airport**	Public	1,240	4,068	Asphalt	7
Baltasound	Shetland	EGPW	UNT	Unst Airport	Public	640	2,100	Asphalt	
Benbecula	Na h-Eileanan Siar	EGPL	BEB	**Benbecula Airport**	Public	1,836	6,023	Asphalt	6
Barra	Na h-Eileanan Siar	EGPR	BRR	**Barra Airport**	Public	846	2,776	Sand	2
Campbeltown	Argyll and Bute	EGEC	CAL	**Campbeltown Airport** (RAF Machrihanish)	Public	3,049	10,003	Asphalt	13
Coll	Argyll and Bute	EGEL	COL	**Coll Airport**	Public	500	1,640	Asphalt	6
Colonsay and Oronsay	Argyll and Bute	EGEY	CSA	**Colonsay Airport**	Public	501	1,644	Asphalt	13
North Ronaldsay	Orkney	EGEN	NRL	**North Ronaldsay Airport**	Public	467	1,532	Graded hardcore	17
Cumbernauld	North Lanarkshire	EGPG	QGG	Cumbernauld Airport	Public	820	2,690	Asphalt	107
Dalcross	Highland	EGPE	INV	**Inverness Airport**	Public	1,887	6,191	Asphalt	9
Dundee	Dundee	EGPN	DND	**Dundee Airport**	Public	1,400	4,593	Asphalt	5
Dunrossness	Shetland	EGPB	LSI	**Sumburgh Airport**	Public	1,426	4,678	Asphalt	6
Eday	Orkney	EGED	EOI	**Eday Airport**	Public	467	1,532	Graded hardcore	6
Edinburgh	Edinburgh	EGPH	EDI	**Edinburgh Airport**	Public	2,560	8,399	Asphalt	41
Fair Isle	Shetland	EGEF	FIE	**Fair Isle Airport**	Private	486	1,594	Gravel	68
Foula	Shetland		FOA	**Foula Airfield**		457	1,500	Gravel	
Islay	Argyll and Bute	EGPI	ILY	**Islay Airport**	Public	1,545	5,068	Asphalt	17
Kinglassie	Fife	EGPJ		Fife Airport	Public	700	2,297	Asphalt	
Kinloss	Moray	EGQK	FSS	Kinloss Barracks	Military	2,311	7,582	Asphalt	
Sanday	Orkney	EGES	NDY	**Sanday Airport**	Public	467	1,532	Graded hardcore	20
Leuchars	Fife	EGQL	ADX	Leuchars Station	Military	2,588	8,491	Asphalt	
Lossiemouth	Moray	EGQS	LMO	RAF Lossiemouth	Military	2,749	9,019	Asphalt	
Out Skerries	Shetland		OUK	Out Skerries Airport					
Papa Stour	Shetland		PSV	Papa Stour Airport	Public	442	1,450	Gravel	
Papa Westray	Orkney	EGEP	PPW	**Papa Westray Airport**	Public	469	1,532	Graded hardcore	28
Paisley	Renfrewshire	EGPF	GLA	**Glasgow Airport**	Public	2,658	8,720	Asphalt	8
Prestwick	South Ayrshire	EGPK	PIK	**Glasgow Prestwick Airport**	Public	2,987	9,799	Concrete/asphalt	20
Mainland, Orkney	Orkney	EGPA	KOI	**Kirkwall Airport**	Public	1,428	4,685	Asphalt	18
Scone	Perth and Kinross	EGPT	PSL	Perth Airport	Public	853	2,799	Asphalt	
Stornoway	Na h-Eileanan Siar	EGPO	SYY	**Stornoway Airport**	Public	2,200	7,218	Asphalt	8
Ashaig	Highland	EGEI	SKL	Broadford Airfield	Public	793	2,602	Grass	
Stronsay	Orkney	EGER	SOY	**Stronsay Airport**	Public	515	1,690	Graded hardcore	12
Tingwall	Shetland	EGET	LWK	**Tingwall Airport**	Public	764	2,507	Asphalt	14
Tiree	Argyll and Bute	EGPU	TRE	**Tiree Airport**	Public	1,472	4,829	Asphalt	
Westray	Orkney	EGEW	WRY	**Westray Airport**	Public	467	1,532	Gravel	9
Whalsay	Shetland	EGEH	WHS	Whalsay Airstrip	Public	457	1,499	Asphalt	
Wick	Highland	EGPC	WIC	**Wick Airport**	Public	1,825	5,988	Asphalt	

== Airports in Wales ==
Location	County	ICAO	IATA	Airport name	Usage	Rwy length		Surface	Elevation (m)
Location	County	ICAO	IATA	Airport name	Usage	(m)	(ft)	Surface	Elevation (m)
Aberporth	Ceredigion	EGFA		Aberporth Airport	Public	1,257	4,124	Asphalt	
Anglesey	Isle of Anglesey	EGOQ		RAF Mona	Military	1,579	5,180	Asphalt	
Caernarfon	Gwynedd	EGCK	QKC	Caernarfon Airport	Public	1,080	3,543	Asphalt	
Cardiff	Cardiff	EGFC		Cardiff Heliport	Public	300	984	Grass	
Haverfordwest	Pembrokeshire	EGFE	HAW	Haverfordwest Airport	Public	1,524	5,000	Asphalt	
Hawarden (Note: Hawarden is in Wales, but the airport also serves Chester in England.)	Flintshire	EGNR	CEG	Chester Hawarden Airport	Public	2,043	6,702	Asphalt/concrete	
Llanbedr	Gwynedd	EGFD	QGF	Llanbedr Airfield	Private	2,286	7,500	Asphalt	
Llanfair yn Neubwll	Isle of Anglesey	EGOV	VLY	Anglesey Airport	Public	2,290	7,513	Asphalt	
Llanfair yn Neubwll	Isle of Anglesey	EGOV	VLY	RAF Valley	Military	2,290	7,513	Asphalt	
Pembrey	Carmarthenshire	EGFP	QKP	Pembrey Airport	Private	805	2,614	Concrete	
Pennard	Swansea	EGFH	SWS	Swansea Airport	Public	1,350	4,429	Asphalt/concrete	
Rhoose	Vale of Glamorgan	EGFF	CWL	**Cardiff Airport**	Public	2,392	7,848	Asphalt	67
St Athan	Vale of Glamorgan	EGSY	DGX	MOD St Athan	Public	1,825	5,988	Asphalt	
Welshpool	Powys	EGCW	QKW	Welshpool Airport	Public	1,020	3,346	Asphalt	

== Airports in the Crown Dependencies ==
Parish	Crown Dependency	ICAO	IATA	Airport name	Usage	Rwy length		Surface	Elevation (m)
Parish	Crown Dependency	ICAO	IATA	Airport name	Usage	(m)	(ft)	Surface	Elevation (m)
Alderney	Guernsey	EGJA	ACI	**Alderney Airport**	Public	880	2,887	Asphalt/grass	88
Andreas	Isle of Man			RAF Andreas	Private			Closed	
Forest	Guernsey	EGJB	GCI	**Guernsey Airport**	Public	1,463	4,800	Asphalt	102
Malew	Isle of Man	EGNS	IOM	**Isle of Man Airport** (Ronaldsway)	Public	2,110	6,923	Asphalt/concrete	16
St Peter	Jersey	EGJJ	JER	**Jersey Airport**	Public	1,706	5,597	Asphalt	84

Another closed airfield on the Isle of Man was Jurby, which was more important than Andreas.

== See also ==
- Aviation in the United Kingdom
- List of air stations of the Royal Navy
- List of airfields of the Army Air Corps (United Kingdom)
- List of Royal Air Force stations
- List of airports by ICAO code: EB-EG#EG – United Kingdom (and British Crown dependencies)
- Wikipedia:WikiProject Aviation/Airline destination lists: Europe#United Kingdom

=== Airports in British overseas territories ===
Map showing airports

- List of airports in Anguilla
- List of airports in Bermuda
- List of airports in the British Indian Ocean Territory
- List of airports in the British Virgin Islands
- List of airports in the Cayman Islands
- List of airports in the Falkland Islands
- List of airports in Gibraltar
- List of airports in Montserrat
- List of airports in Saint Helena, Ascension and Tristan da Cunha
- List of airports in the Turks and Caicos Islands
