= Lists of airports in North America =

This page contains the lists of airports in North America by country, grouped by region. The lists include both military air bases and civilian airports.

== Northern America ==
- List of airports in Bermuda
- List of airports in Canada
- List of airports in Greenland
- List of airports in Saint Pierre and Miquelon
- List of airports in the United States

== Central America ==
- List of airports in Belize
- List of airports in Costa Rica
- List of airports in El Salvador
- List of airports in Guatemala
- List of airports in Honduras
- List of airports in Mexico
- List of airports in Nicaragua
- List of airports in Panama

== Caribbean ==
- List of airports in Anguilla
- List of airports in Antigua and Barbuda
- List of airports in Aruba
- List of airports in the Bahamas
- List of airports in Barbados
- List of airports in British Virgin Islands
- List of airports in the Cayman Islands
- List of airports in Cuba
- List of airports in Curaçao
- List of airports in Dominica
- List of airports in Dominican Republic
- List of airports in Grenada
- List of airports in Guadeloupe
- List of airports in Haiti
- List of airports in Jamaica
- List of airports in Martinique
- List of airports in Montserrat
- List of airports in Puerto Rico
- List of airports in Saint Barthélemy
- List of airports in Saint Kitts and Nevis
- List of airports in Saint Lucia
- List of airports in Saint Vincent and the Grenadines
- List of airports in Sint Maarten
- List of airports in Trinidad and Tobago
- List of airports in the Turks and Caicos Islands
- List of airports in United States Virgin Islands

== See also ==
- Lists of airports
- List of busiest airports in North America
- Airports Council International-North America, the industry group collectively representing North America's airports
- Wikipedia:WikiProject Aviation/Airline destination lists: North America
