= Clacton (disambiguation) =

Clacton-on-Sea is a large town in Essex, England.

Clacton may also refer to the following things associated with it:

- Clacton (constituency), a county constituency represented in the House of Commons around Clacton-on-Sea
- Clacton-on-Sea railway station, a railway station in Clacton-on-Sea
- Clacton Airport, an airport serving Clacton-on-Sea
- Clacton Pier, a pier in Clacton-on-Sea
- Clacton Coastal Academy, a coeducational high school serving the western part of Clacton-on-Sea
- Clacton County High School, a comprehensive secondary school located in Clacton-on-Sea
- Clacton Town F.C., a football club based in Clacton-on-Sea
- Great Clacton, a village north of Clacton-on-Sea
- HMS Clacton (J151), a turbine engined Bangor class minesweeper of World War II named after Clacton-on-Sea
- Little Clacton, a small rural village close to Clacton-on-Sea
- Clactonian, a flint tool
- Butlin's Clacton, a former holiday camp
- Clacton Spear, the oldest known worked wooden implement
