= Veritair =

Wales-based helicopter charter company

Veritair Aviation
IATA	ICAO	Call sign
—	EGFC	Veritair
- Founded: 1982
- Ceased operations: 2008
- Hubs: Cardiff Heliport
- Fleet size: 4
- Destinations: UK & Europe
- Headquarters: Cardiff, Wales
- Key people: Capt Julian Verity, Capt Phill Hall-Davis.
- Website: https://web.archive.org/web/20110202063906/http://veritair.com/

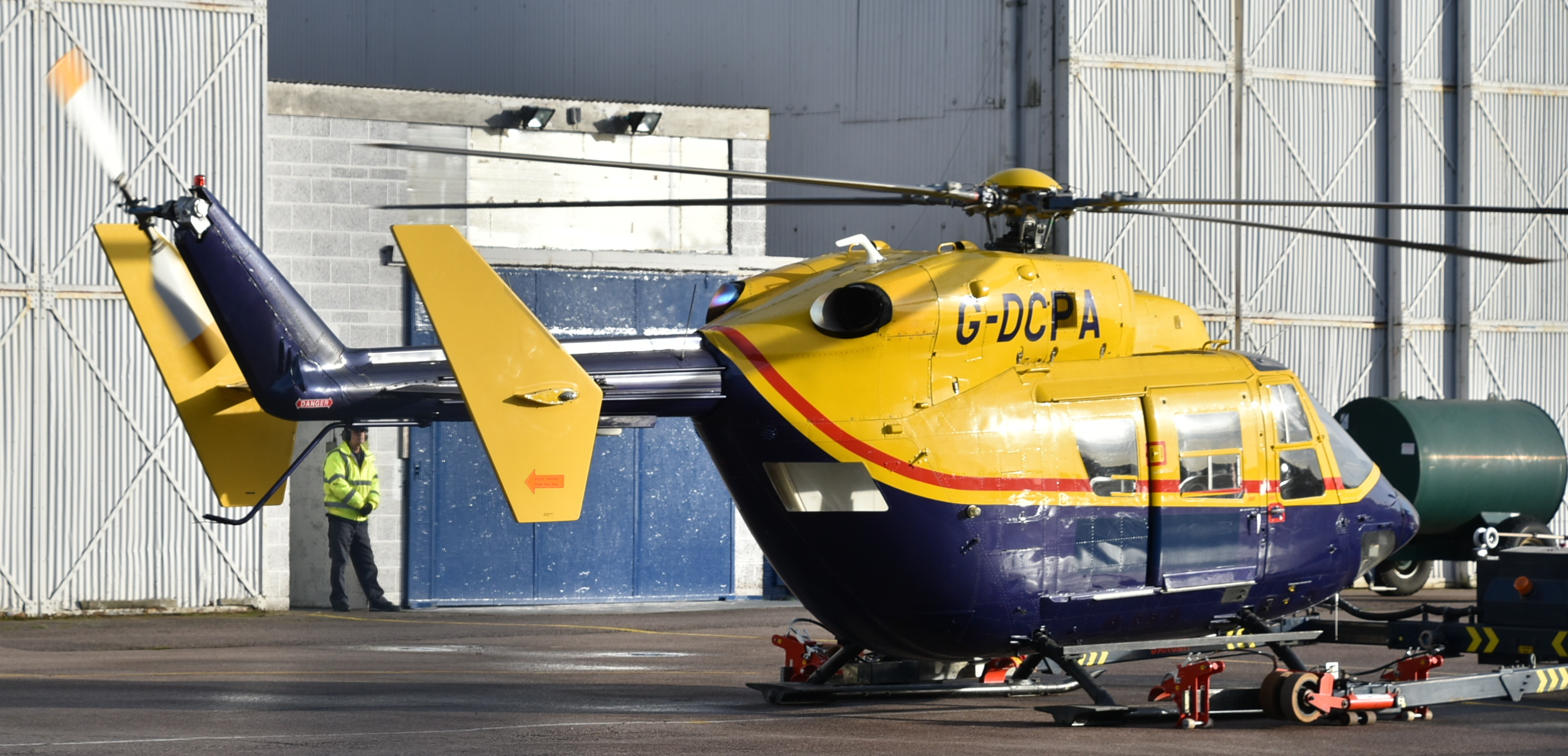
MBB-Kawasaki BK117-C1 of Veritair at Coventry

Veritair Aviation Limited is a helicopter charter company based at Cardiff Heliport, in Cardiff, Wales. It operates year-round charter and contract helicopter services throughout United Kingdom and Europe. Veritair Aviation has major contracts with the BBC for measurement of transmitting antenna radiation patterns throughout the UK and further afield, QinetiQ for recovering MOD targets offshore and provides a British Transport Police helicopter to patrol and secure railway lines throughout the UK.

Veritair Aviation was created following a management buyout in 2008 of Veritair from British International Helicopters led by Captain Julian Verity. Veritair Aviation holds a United Kingdom Civil Aviation Authority Air Operator Certificate, which permits it to carry passengers for public air transportation.

== History ==
Veritair was founded by Julian Verity, its present managing director, in 1982 based at Cardiff Wales Airport operating a solitary Bell Jetranger helicopter. TV and Broadcasters were and remain major users of the company's services both home and abroad; Verity was credited as a helicopter pilot in the Welsh history television series The Dragon Has Two Tongues. The company quickly expanded with 2 Bell helicopters and in 1985 moved “downtown” into the first Cardiff Heliport, opened by Jim Callahan MP. Branching into both police, BBC and MoD work in the 1990s saw the Company grow and diversify.

Veritair operates both single and twin-engine helicopters and now occupies the new £4m Cardiff Heliport opened in 2000 by HRH Prince of Wales in Cardiff Bay. Veritair's progress has seen its ownership change hands several times over the past 27 years but its name, management and Welsh identity has remained throughout.

Previous owners include significant world-class helicopter operators including CHC Helicopter Corporation and more recently British International Helicopters (whose roots go back to British Airways Helicopters).

== Fleet ==
The Veritair Aviation fleet consists of the following aircraft:

- 1 x MBB BK117C1
- 1 x Aerospatiale AS355N Twin Squirrel
- 1 x MBB Bo 105Db4

== See also ==
- List of defunct airlines of the United Kingdom
