= Bembridge Airport =

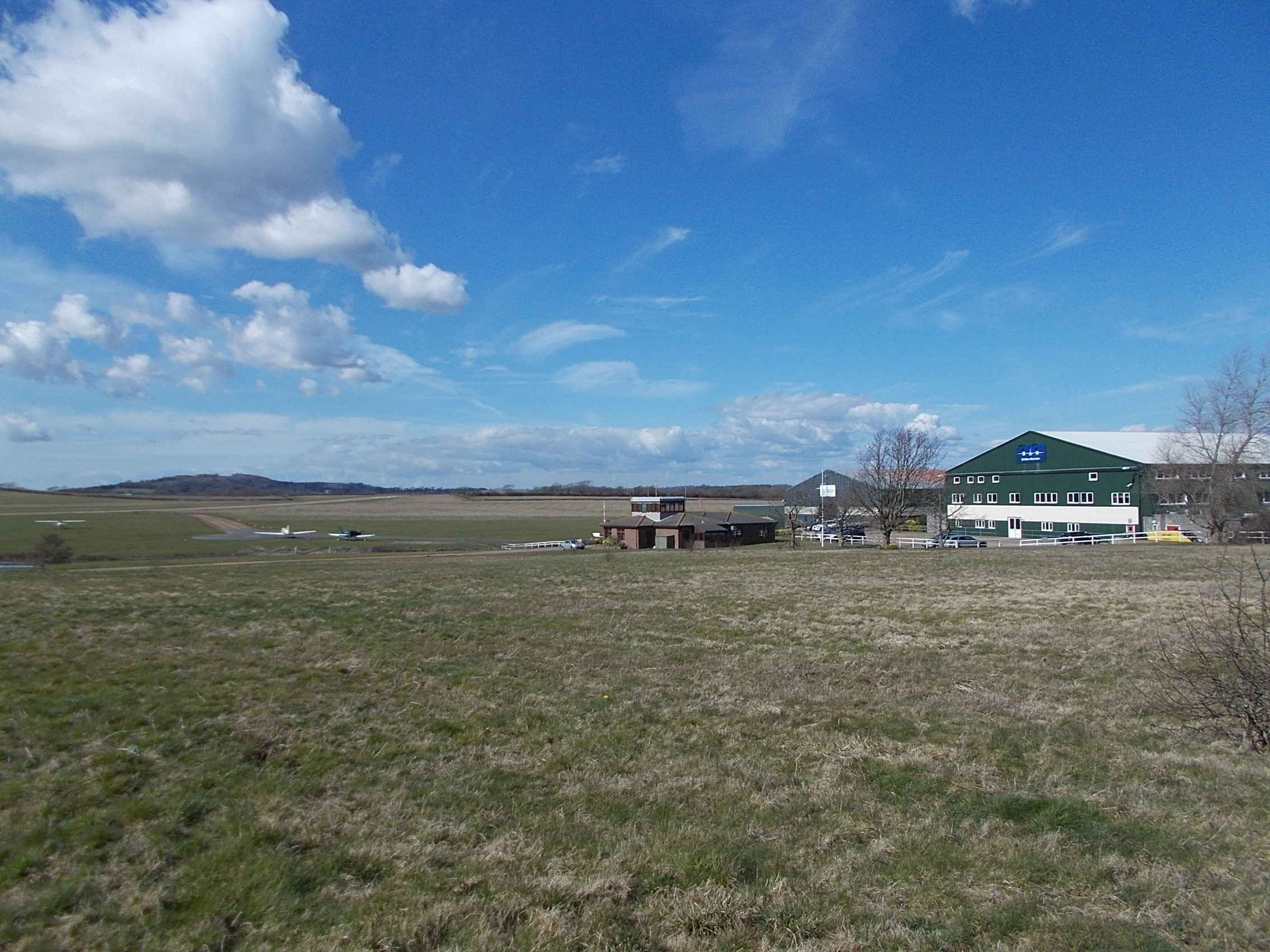
- IATA: BBP; ICAO: EGHJ

Summary
- Airport type: Public
- Operator: Vectis Gliding Club Ltd
- Location: Bembridge
- Elevation AMSL: 53 ft (16 m)
- Coordinates: 50°40′41″N 001°06′34″W
- Website: https://eghj.extremelynice.net/eghj/

Map
- Location on the Isle of Wight

Runways
Direction	Length		Surface
Direction	m	ft	Surface
12/30	827	2,713	Concrete

Statistics (2007)
- Movements: 13,354
- Sources: Aerodrome information from Bembridge Airport; Statistics from the UK Civil Aviation Authority

Bembridge Airport (IATA: BBP, ICAO: EGHJ) is an unlicensed aerodrome located about a mile south-west of the village of Bembridge, Isle of Wight, England. It is one of four airstrips on the Isle of Wight, and one of two large airfields, the other major one being Isle of Wight/Sandown Airport about four miles to the south-west.

Bembridge Airport is open to non-residents PPR (prior permission required).

Gliding no longer takes place from Bembridge.

== History ==
Bembridge opened in 1920 with commercial airline service starting in 1934. In 1965, Britten-Norman began production, adjacent to the airport, with their prototype Islander aircraft.

== Accidents and incidents ==
=== 2000 ===
7 October
A Piper Cub towplane and a glider collided over the airfield. The Piper Cub had released a different glider and was returning to the airfield. Both pilots survived the collision.

=== 2010 ===
4 September
A Mooney M20J, and a Vans RV-4, "participating in the Merlin Trophy Air Race, which started and finished at Bembridge Airport", collided 3.7 nm from the airport. The Mooney broke up and crashed killing both occupants. The Vans was able to land at Bembridge, with both occupants receiving minor injuries.

=== 2016 ===
16 February
A Cessna R172M Skyhawk inverted following a nose-over with minor injuries to three occupants.

=== 2018 ===
12 July
A Beagle B121 Pup experienced loss of power after takeoff and made a forced landing outside the airfield. Both occupants survived with injuries.
