= RAF Sturgate =

Former RAF station in Lincolnshire, England

RAF Sturgate
- Lincoln, Lincolnshire in England

Site information
- Type: Royal Air Force station
- Owner: Ministry of Defence
- Operator: Royal Air Force; United States Air Force
- Controlled by: RAF Bomber Command; Strategic Air Command

Location
- Shown within Lincolnshire RAF Sturgate (the United Kingdom)
- Coordinates: 53°22′45″N 000°40′59″W

Site history
- Built: 1944
- In use: 1944-1946; 1953-1964
- Battles/wars: European theatre of World War II

Airfield information
- Identifiers: ICAO: EGCS
- Elevation: 16 metres (52 ft) AMSL
Runways
| Direction | Length and surface |
|---|---|
| 00/00 | Asphalt |
| 00/00 | Asphalt |
| 00/00 | Asphalt |

Royal Air Force Sturgate or more simply RAF Sturgate is a former Royal Air Force station located 10 miles (16 km) north west of Lincoln, Lincolnshire, England.

== Royal Air Force use ==
The airfield was opened in 1944 at Royal Air Force Sturgate. Originally used for blind flying training two operational Lancaster squadrons arrived in June 1945 but both then moved to RAF Waddington in January 1946. The station closed to flying between 1946 and 1953.

=== RAF units and aircraft ===
| Unit | Dates | Aircraft | Variant | Notes |
|---|---|---|---|---|
| No. 50 Squadron RAF | 1945-1946 | Avro Lancaster | I & III | Four-engined heavy bomber. |
| No. 61 Squadron RAF | 1945-1946 | Avro Lancaster | II | Four-engined heavy bomber. |

== United States Air Force use ==
In 1953 the station was allocated for use by the United States Air Force Strategic Air Command and the 508th Strategic Fighter Wing operating the Republic F-84 Thunderjet. It was also used to house SAC bombers on temporary duty (TDY) from the United States. From 1959, it was used for logistical support facilities for 99th Munitions Maintenance Squadron (USAF) located at the PGM-17 Thor missile unit at nearby RAF Hemswell. The airfield was closed in 1964.

== Current use ==
A corner of the original airfield is now used as an unlicensed aerodrome for civil use as Sturgate Airfield.
