= List of airports by ICAO code: T =

List of airports by ICAO code: A - B - C - D - EB-EG - EH-EY - FA-FM - FN-FZ - G - H - ~~I~~ - J - KA-KH - KI-KP - KR-KZ - LA-LJ - LK-LZ - M - N - O - P - Q - R - SA-SC - SD-SH - SI - SJ - SK-SM - SN-SP - SQ - SS-SU - SV-SY - T - U - V - W - ~~X~~ - Y - Z

ICAO	IATA	Airport name	Community	Coordinates	Notes
TAPA	ANU	V. C. Bird International Airport	Saint John's, Antigua, Antigua and Barbuda	17°08′12″N 061°47′35″W	
TAPH	BBQ	Codrington Airport	Codrington, Barbuda, Antigua and Barbuda	17°38′09″N 061°49′37″W	
TAPT		Coco Point Lodge Airstrip	Coco Point, Barbuda, Antigua and Barbuda	17°33′21″N 061°45′52″W	Closed
TBPB	BGI	Grantley Adams International Airport	Bridgetown, Barbados	13°04′29″N 059°29′33″W	
TBPO		Bridgetown Heliport	Bridgetown, Barbados	13°05′45″N 059°37′07″W	Closed
TDCF	DCF	Canefield Airport	Roseau, Dominica	15°20′12″N 061°23′32″W	
TDPD	DOM	Douglas–Charles Airport	Marigot, Dominica	15°32′49″N 061°18′00″W	
TFFA	DSD	La Désirade Airport	Beauséjour, La Désirade, Guadeloupe	16°17′50″N 061°05′00″W	
TFFB	BBR	Baillif Airport	Baillif, Basse-Terre, Guadeloupe	16°00′50″N 061°44′35″W	
TFFC	SFC	Saint-François Airport	Saint-François, Grande-Terre, Guadeloupe	16°15′28″N 061°15′45″W	
TFFF	FDF	Martinique Aimé Césaire International Airport	Le Lamentin, Fort-de-France, Martinique	14°35′32″N 060°59′47″W	
TFFG	SFG	L'Espérance Airport	Grand Case, Collectivity of Saint Martin	18°06′02″N 063°02′56″W	
TFFJ	SBH	Gustaf III Airport	St. Jean, Saint Barthélemy	17°54′16″N 062°50′38″W	
TFFM	GBJ	Marie-Galante Airport	Grand-Bourg, Marie-Galante, Guadeloupe	15°52′07″N 061°16′20″W	
TFFR	PTP	Pointe-à-Pitre International Airport	Pointe-à-Pitre, Grande-Terre, Guadeloupe	16°15′51″N 061°31′33″W	
TFFS	LSS	Les Saintes Airport	Terre-de-Haut, Les Saintes, Guadeloupe	15°51′52″N 061°34′50″W	
TGPG		Pearls Airport	Grenville, Grenada	12°08′37″N 061°37′00″W	Closed
TGPY	GND	Maurice Bishop International Airport	St. George's, Grenada	12°00′15″N 061°47′10″W	
TGPZ	CRU	Lauriston Airport (Carriacou Island Airport)	Hillsborough, Carriacou Island, Grenada	12°28′37″N 061°28′20″W	
TIST	STT	Cyril E. King Airport	St. Thomas, United States Virgin Islands	18°20′14″N 064°58′24″W	
TISX	STX	Henry E. Rohlsen Airport	St. Croix, United States Virgin Islands	17°42′16″N 064°48′06″W	
TJAB	ARE	Antonio (Nery) Juarbe Pol Airport	Arecibo, Puerto Rico	18°27′04″N 066°40′32″W	
TJBQ	BQN	Rafael Hernández Airport	Aquadilla, Puerto Rico	18°29′42″N 067°07′46″W	Formerly Ramey Air Force Base (TJFF)
TJCP	CPX	Benjamin Rivera Noriega Airport	Culebra, Puerto Rico	18°18′48″N 065°18′16″W	
TJFA	FAJ	Diego Jimenez Torres Airport	Fajardo, Puerto Rico	18°18′29″N 065°39′43″W	
TJIG	SIG	Fernando Luis Ribas Dominicci Airport (Isla Grande Airport)	San Juan, Puerto Rico	18°27′24″N 066°05′54″W	
TJMZ	MAZ	Eugenio María de Hostos Airport	Mayagüez, Puerto Rico	18°15′20″N 067°08′54″W	
TJPS	PSE	Mercedita International Airport	Ponce, Puerto Rico	18°00′30″N 066°33′47″W	
TJRV	NRR	José Aponte de la Torre Airport	Ceiba, Puerto Rico	18°14′43″N 065°38′36″W	Formerly Roosevelt Roads Naval Station (TJNR)
TJSJ	SJU	Luis Muñoz Marín International Airport	San Juan, Puerto Rico	18°26′21″N 066°00′07″W	
TJVQ	VQS	Antonio Rivera Rodríguez Airport	Vieques, Puerto Rico	18°08′05″N 065°29′38″W	
TKPK	SKB	Robert L. Bradshaw International Airport	Basseterre, Saint Kitts, Saint Kitts and Nevis	17°18′41″N 062°43′07″W	
TKPN	NEV	Vance W. Amory International Airport	Charlestown, Nevis, Saint Kitts and Nevis	17°12′20″N 062°35′24″W	
TLPC	SLU	George F. L. Charles Airport (formerly Vigie Airport)	Castries, Saint Lucia	14°01′13″N 060°59′35″W	
TLPL	UVF	Hewanorra International Airport	Vieux-Fort, Saint Lucia	13°44′00″N 060°57′09″W	
TNCA	AUA	Queen Beatrix International Airport	Oranjestad, Aruba	12°30′05″N 070°00′55″W	
TNCB	BON	Flamingo International Airport	Kralendijk, Bonaire	12°07′52″N 068°16′07″W	
TNCC	CUR	Curaçao International Airport (Hato International Airport)	Willemstad, Curaçao	12°11′20″N 068°57′35″W	
TNCE	EUX	F. D. Roosevelt Airport	Sint Eustatius	17°29′47″N 062°58′46″W	
TNCM	SXM	Princess Juliana International Airport	Philipsburg, Sint Maarten	18°02′27″N 063°06′34″W	
TNCS	SAB	Juancho E. Yrausquin Airport	Saba	17°38′44″N 063°13′14″W	
TQPF	AXA	Clayton J. Lloyd International Airport	The Valley, Anguilla	18°12′17″N 063°03′18″W	
TRPG	MNI	John A. Osborne Airport	Gerald's, Montserrat	16°47′29″N 062°11′36″W	
TRPM	MNI	W.H. Bramble Airport (Blackburne)	Plymouth, Montserrat	16°45′32″N 062°09′23″W	Closed
TTCP	TAB	Arthur Napoleon Raymond Robinson International Airport	Scarborough, Tobago, Trinidad and Tobago	11°08′59″N 060°49′56″W	
TTPP	POS	Piarco International Airport	Port of Spain, Trinidad, Trinidad and Tobago	10°35′43″N 061°20′14″W	
TUPA	NGD	Auguste George Airport	Anegada, British Virgin Islands	18°43′39″N 064°19′41″W	
TUPG		Virgin Gorda North Sound Water Aerodrome	Virgin Gorda, British Virgin Islands	18°30′05″N 064°22′59″W	
TUPJ	EIS	Terrance B. Lettsome International Airport	Beef Island / Tortola, British Virgin Islands	18°26′44″N 064°32′35″W	
TUPW	VIJ	Virgin Gorda Airport	Virgin Gorda, British Virgin Islands	18°26′44″N 064°25′41″W	
TVSA	SVD	Argyle International Airport	Argyle, Saint Vincent, Saint Vincent and the Grenadines	13°09′23″N 061°09′01″W	
TVSB	BQU	J. F. Mitchell Airport	Bequia, Grenadines, Saint Vincent and the Grenadines	12°59′18″N 061°15′43″W	
TVSC	CIW	Canouan Airport	Canouan, Grenadines, Saint Vincent and the Grenadines	12°41′57″N 061°20′33″W	
TVSM	MQS	Mustique Airport	Mustique, Grenadines, Saint Vincent and the Grenadines	12°53′17″N 061°10′49″W	
TVSU	UNI	Union Island Airport	Union Island, Grenadines, Saint Vincent and the Grenadines	12°35′55″N 061°24′53″W	
TVSV	SVD	E. T. Joshua Airport	Arnos Vale, Saint Vincent, Saint Vincent and the Grenadines	13°08′40″N 061°12′39″W	Closed
TXKF	BDA	L. F. Wade International Airport	Ferry Reach, Bermuda	32°21′51″N 064°40′43″W	

== See also ==
Lists of airports:

- Anguilla
- Antigua and Barbuda
- Aruba
- Barbados
- Bermuda
- Bonaire
- British Virgin Islands
- Curaçao
- Dominica
- Grenada
- Guadeloupe
- Martinique
- Montserrat
- Puerto Rico
- Saba
- Saint Barthélemy
- Saint Kitts and Nevis
- Saint Lucia
- Saint Martin
- Saint Vincent and the Grenadines
- Sint Eustatius
- Sint Maarten
- Trinidad and Tobago
- United States Virgin Islands
