= RAF Bourn =

Former RAF Base in Cambridgeshire, England

RAF Bourn
- Near Bourn, Cambridgeshire in England
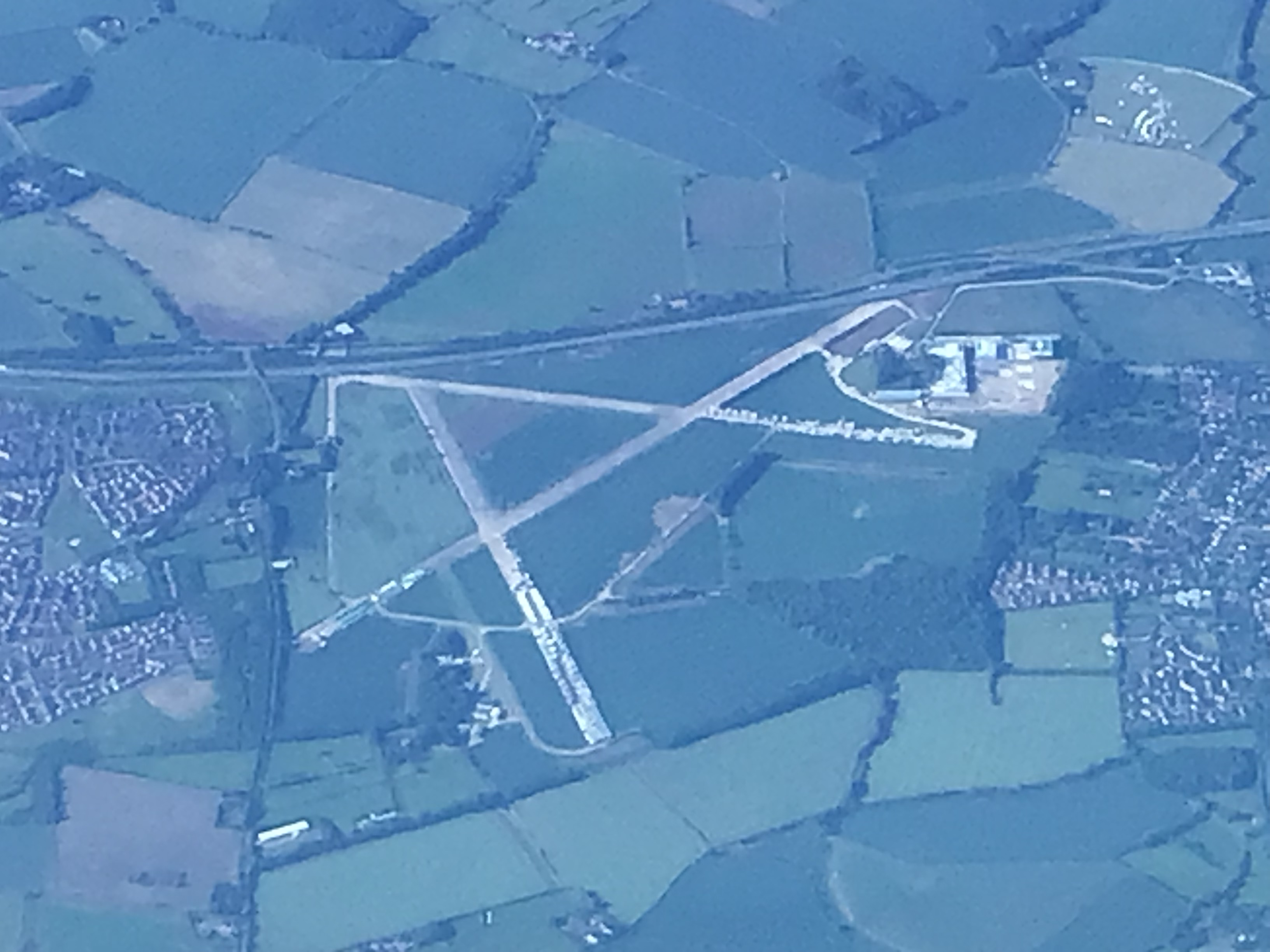
- RAF Bourn (2024)

Site information
- Type: Royal Air Force station
- Code: AU
- Owner: Air Ministry
- Operator: Royal Air Force
- Controlled by: RAF Bomber Command * No. 1 Group RAF * No. 2 Group RAF * No. 3 Group RAF * No. 5 Group RAF * No. 8 (PFF) Group RAF

Location
- Shown within Cambridgeshire RAF Bourn (the United Kingdom)
- Coordinates: 52°12′58″N 000°02′26″W

Site history
- Built: 1940/41
- In use: April 1941 - 1948
- Battles/wars: European theatre of World War II

Airfield information
- Elevation: 235 feet (72 m) AMSL
Runways
Direction	Length and surface
00/00	Concrete
06/24	Concrete
18/36	Concrete

Royal Air Force Bourn or more simply RAF Bourn is a former Royal Air Force station located 2 miles (3.2 km) north of Bourn, Cambridgeshire and 7 miles (11 km) west of Cambridge, Cambridgeshire, England.

== History ==
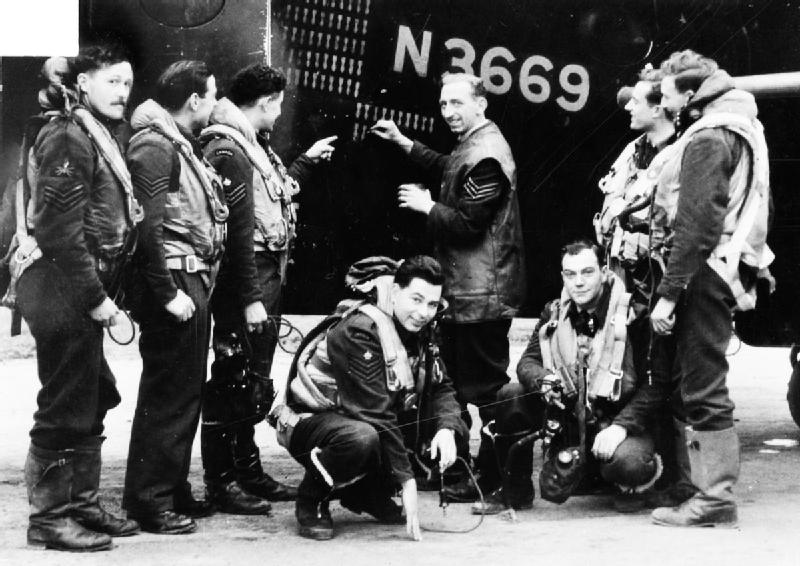
The crew of the Short Stirling Mark I, N3669 'LS-H', of No. 15 Squadron RAF watch as the scoreboard tally on their aircraft is chalked up with their 62nd raid, at Bourn, Cambridgeshire. N3669 went on to complete 67 operations, a record for the Stirling, before she was reduced to an instructional airframe in February 1943.

Bourn Airfield was constructed for RAF Bomber Command in 1940 as a satellite airfield for nearby RAF Oakington. It was used by No. 101 Squadron RAF Vickers Wellingtons for training purposes from 23 July 1941, and from October of that year 101 and 7 Squadrons used the airfield when Oakington became unavailable.

On 9 April 1941, the airfield was subjected to the first of four raids when a Junkers Ju 88C strafed the airfield buildings and bombed the runway; however, little damage was done and there were no injuries. Two more raids on 8 and 23 May 1944 were made, the latter damaging two parked de Havilland Mosquitoes.

As the strategic bombing offensive intensified, the losses mounted. By the time of the last operational sortie on 4 April 1945, a total of 164 aircraft had been lost, either from the squadrons based at Bourn or from others trying, and failing, to land on the field. The average age of aircrew was 23 and over a third of these were under 20 years of age. Of the 886 listed names, 648 were killed and many of the 35 injured subsequently died of their wounds. The number killed was probably greater than that of the entire population of the village at the time.

97 Squadron's Avro Lancasters were replaced by the Mosquito IXs of 105 Sqn in March 1944. These Oboe-equipped aircraft were able to identify targets with great precision and then mark them accurately.

In December 1944, 162 Squadron was formed at Bourn with Canadian-built Mosquito XXs and XXVs which flew almost nightly to Berlin, target-marking for the Light Night Strike Force. The two squadrons operated together from Bourn for much of the rest of the war.

From 1941 to 1945, damaged Short Stirlings were repaired and test-flown from Bourn. These were transported to the airfield from the Sebro factory near Madingley which later continued its work with RAF and United States Army Air Forces (USAAF), Consolidated B-24 Liberators. The Bourn and Madingley units together employed up to 4,500 personnel.

The following units were here at some point:

- Detachment of No. 23 Operational Training Unit RAF (May - June 1942)
- No. 1323 Automatic Gun Laying Turret Flight RAF (November 1944 - January 1945)
- No. 1409 (Meteorological) Flight RAF (November 1943 - January 1944)
- No. 1696 Bomber (Defence) Training Flight RAF (October 1944 - June 1945)
- No. 2708 Squadron RAF Regiment

== Post-war ==
The airfield was passed on to RAF Maintenance Command in 1947. By 1948, the station was closed and the last sections were sold off for agricultural use in 1961.

== Current use ==
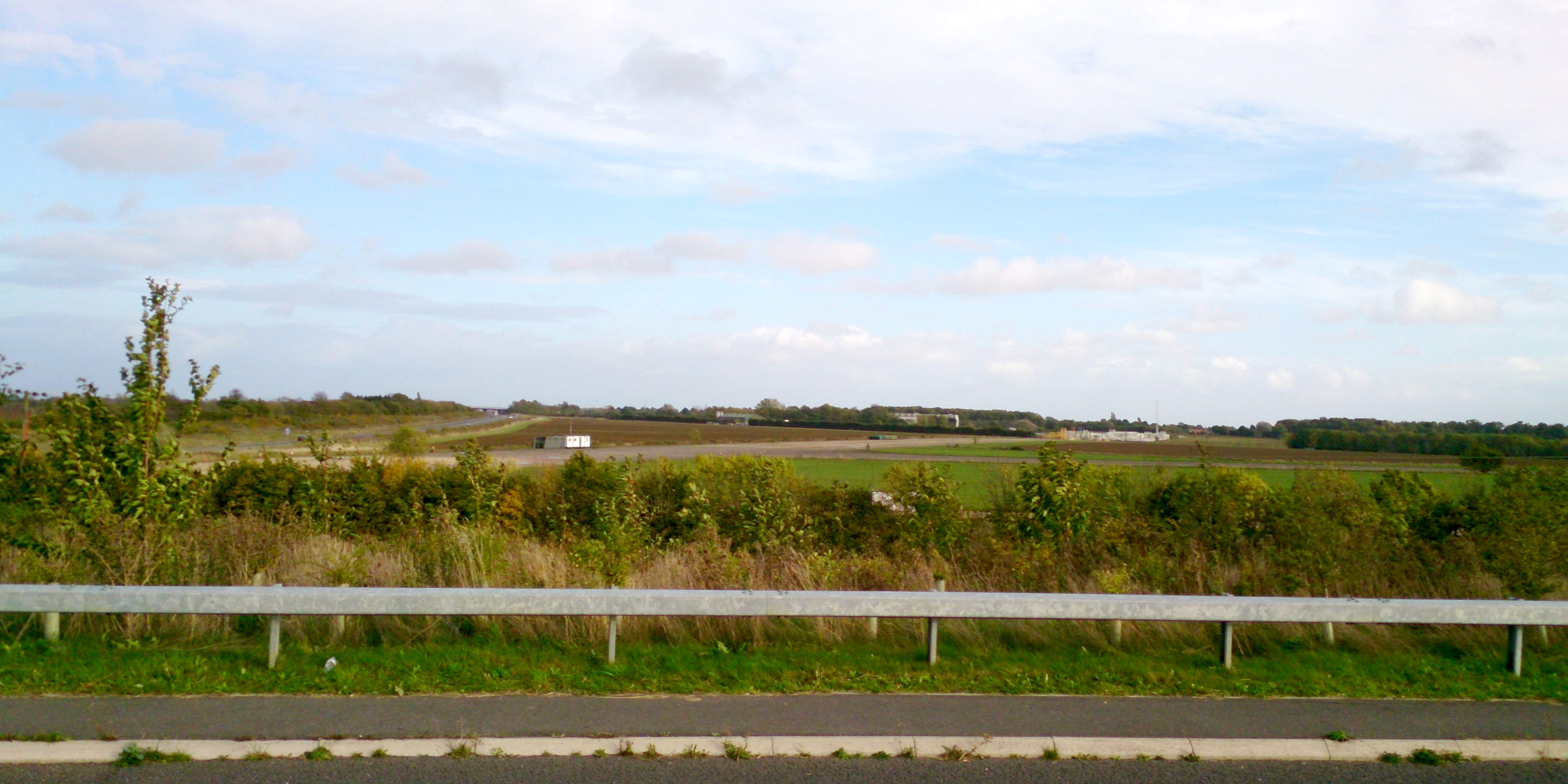
Bourn Airfield viewed from Broadway in October 2013

Now the Rural Flying Corps uses part of the runway for light aircraft; small industrial developments occupy other areas of the site. On Bank Holidays, Bourn Market uses much of the old runways for stalls.

== See also ==
- Bourn Airfield
- List of former Royal Air Force stations
