= Clacton Airport =

Clacton Aerodrome Clacton Airport
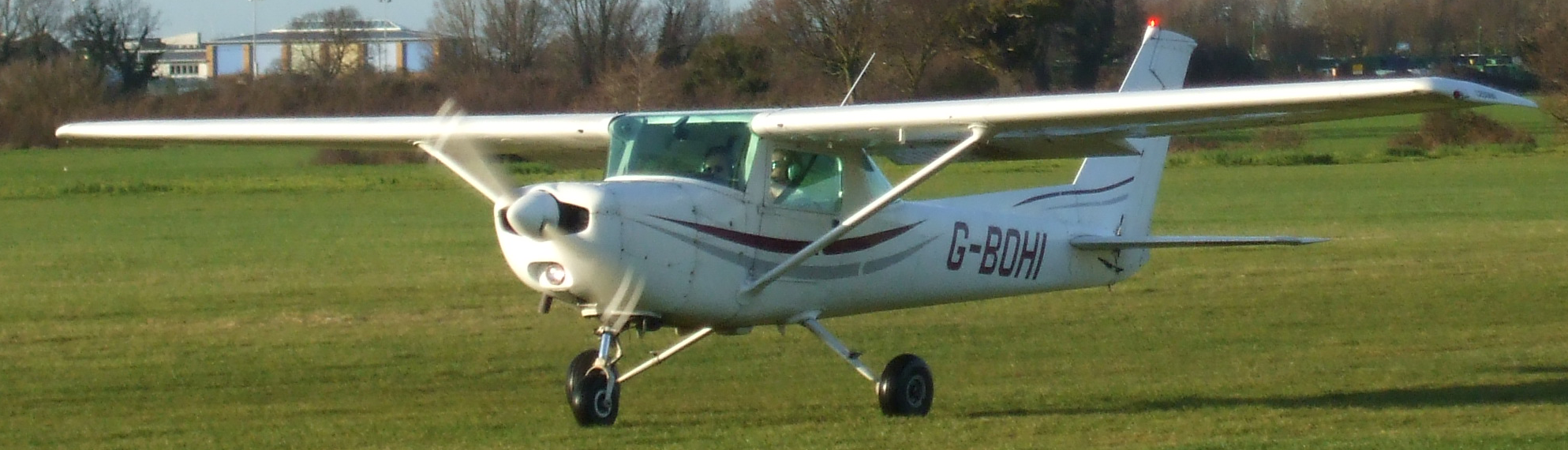
- IATA: none; ICAO: EGSQ

Summary
- Airport type: Private
- Operator: Clacton Aero Club
- Location: Clacton-on-Sea, Essex, England
- Elevation AMSL: 37 ft / 11 m
- Coordinates: 51°47′06″N 001°07′48″E
- Website: www.clactonaeroclub.co.uk

Map
- Location in Essex

Runways
Direction	Length		Surface
Direction	m	ft	Surface
18/36	542	1,778	Grass
- Source: Clacton Aero Club

Clacton Aerodrome (ICAO: EGSQ), also known as Clacton Airfield, is a small grass-runway airfield serving Clacton-on-Sea, Essex, England. It lies about 2 nautical miles (3.7 km) west of the town and is operated by the Clacton Aero Club. The field is presently unlicensed and is used primarily for flight training and recreational flying.

== History ==
The present aerodrome dates from the early 1960s, with sources placing its establishment around 1963. Clacton Aero Club formally opened in 1988 and has since operated the airfield as a flying school.

Earlier aviation activity in the area, particularly in the 1930s, took place from temporary or farm fields such as Earls Hall Farm and Plough Lane, but these have no direct continuity with the current site.

During its early years, Clacton Aerodrome was best known for pleasure flights and local sightseeing trips along the Essex coast. These became less central after the Aero Club made flight training its main activity.

Licensing status has varied over time. An AAIB report into a 2009 incident recorded that Clacton was then a licensed airfield. As of 2025, Clacton is not listed among the UK CAA’s certificated aerodromes and operates as an unlicensed general aviation field.

== Facilities and operations ==
The aerodrome has one grass runway, aligned 18/36. Declared distances are:

- Runway 18: LDA 505 m; TORA 542 m
- Runway 36: LDA 530 m; TORA 505 m

Radio is provided on 118.155 MHz when the field is staffed. Operations are PPR (Prior Permission Required) by telephone; non-radio aircraft are accepted, but helicopters and microlights are not permitted.

A distinctive feature of the airfield is the public footpath which crosses the runway about 180 m from the Runway 18 threshold. The operator inspects the path daily and manages it as part of its safety procedures.

The airfield is used mainly for training towards the PPL and LAPL, trial lessons, and aircraft hire.

== Accidents and incidents ==
- 17 April 2022 – A Grob G115B (G-BYDB) overran the runway after touching down just before the footpath on Runway 18, coming to rest in the boundary hedge. No injuries were reported. The AAIB drew attention to the short declared distances at Clacton in its report.
- 9 May 2009 – A Cessna 152 (G-BNUS) suffered a nose-gear collapse after a bounced landing on Runway 18. The aircraft crossed the public footpath before coming to a halt. There were no injuries. The AAIB noted that the transition across the footpath was appropriately managed.
- 19 June 1999 – A Cessna 172M (G-BSCR) was written off after a heavy landing bent both wings rearwards. No injuries occurred.
- 18 August 1996 – A DH.82A Tiger Moth (G-ANPK) suffered engine failure shortly after takeoff from Runway 18 and struck a sea wall during a forced landing attempt. The pilot and two pedestrians were injured. The AAIB investigation suggested possible fuel contamination and raised concerns about harness integrity.

== In popular culture ==
Clacton Aerodrome has inspired modern digital interest:

- Microsoft Flight Simulator 2020 mod (2023): Clacton Aerodrome was faithfully reproduced by Vortex Scenery Designs, including features such as the grass runway and the public footpath crossing the field.

== See also ==
- List of airports in the United Kingdom
- General aviation in the United Kingdom
