= List of airports in the Dutch Caribbean =

This is a list of airports in the Dutch Caribbean, sorted by location.

The Caribbean part of the Kingdom of the Netherlands is made of 6 islands: the dependent countries of Aruba, Curaçao and Sint Maarten, and the special municipalities of Bonaire, Sint Eustatius and Saba. From 1954 to 2010, it constituted the dependent country of the Netherlands Antilles, from which Aruba split in 1986.

== List ==
Island (city/location)	ICAO	IATA	Airport name	Coordinates
Oranjestad	TNCA	AUA	Queen Beatrix International Airport Formerly Dakota Field	12°30′05″N 70°00′55″W
Bonaire (Kralendijk)	TNCB	BON	Flamingo International Airport	12°07′51″N 068°16′06″W
Curaçao (Willemstad)	TNCC	CUR	Curaçao International Airport, also known as Hato International Airport	12°11′19″N 068°57′35″W
Saba (Flat Point, Zion's Hill)	TNCS	SAB	Juancho E. Yrausquin Airport	17°38′43″N 063°13′14″W
Sint Eustatius (Oranjestad)	TNCE	EUX	F. D. Roosevelt Airport	17°29′47″N 062°58′45″W
Sint Maarten (Philipsburg)	TNCM	SXM	Princess Juliana International Airport	18°02′27″N 063°06′32″W

== See also ==
- List of airports by ICAO code: T#TN - Caribbean Netherlands, Aruba, Curaçao and Sint Maarten
- Communications in the Dutch Caribbean
- Wikipedia:WikiProject Aviation/Airline destination lists: North America § The Caribbean
