= Sturgate Airfield =

Airfield in Lincolnshire, England

- IATA: none; ICAO: EGCS

Summary
- Airport type: Private
- Operator: Eastern Air Executive Ltd
- Location: Lincolnshire
- Elevation AMSL: 57 ft / 17 m
- Coordinates: 53°22′50″N 000°41′19″W

Map
- Location in Lincolnshire

Runways
Direction	Length		Surface
Direction	m	ft	Surface
09/27	820	2,690	Paved
- runway 14/32 disused

Sturgate Airfield (ICAO: EGCS) is an aerodrome located 10 miles (16 km) north of Lincoln, Lincolnshire, England.

== History ==
=== Second World War ===
Originally opened in 1944 as RAF Sturgate, the airfield was planned as an operational bomber air station, but opened too late to see active use.

=== Post war ===
The RAF station was closed down between 1946 and 1953, but saw further service as a Royal Air Force base until 1964, providing a relief airfield for USAF SAC fighter units being relocated to other bases.

The Lincoln Parachute Centre operated from 1980, but closed in May 1988.

== Current ownership ==
Tenanted and operated by Eastern Air Executive Ltd, the airfield has recently undergone improvement works since acquisition by the MPS Group of Companies.
