= List of airports in the British Virgin Islands =

This is a list of airports in the British Virgin Islands, sorted by location.

== Airports ==
Airport names shown in bold indicate the airport has scheduled service on commercial airlines.

**Location**	**ICAO**	**IATA**	**Airport name**	Coordinates
Anegada	TUPA	NGD	**Auguste George Airport**	18°43′39″N 64°19′41″W
Beef Island / Tortola	TUPJ	EIS	**Terrance B. Lettsome International Airport**	18°26′44″N 064°32′35″W
Virgin Gorda	TUPW	VIJ	**Virgin Gorda Airport**	18°26′44″N 64°25′41″W
Virgin Gorda / Spanish Town	TUPG	NSX	North Sound Water Aerodrome	18°30′00″N 064°22′00″W

== See also ==
- Transport in the British Virgin Islands
- List of airports by ICAO code: T#TU - British Virgin Islands
- List of airports in the United Kingdom and the British Crown Dependencies
- Wikipedia:WikiProject Aviation/Airline destination lists: North America#British Virgin Islands (United Kingdom)
