= Bourn Airfield =

Airfield in Cambridgeshire, England

Bourn Airport
- IATA: none; ICAO: EGSN

Summary
- Airport type: Private
- Operator: Rural Flying Corps
- Location: Cambridge, Cambridgeshire, England
- Elevation AMSL: 226 ft / 69 m
- Coordinates: 52°12′38″N 000°02′33″W
- Website: www.rfcbourn.flyer.co.uk

Map
- Location in Cambridgeshire

Runways
Direction	Length		Surface
Direction	m	ft	Surface
06/24	568	1,864	Bitumen
18/36	633	2,077	Bitumen
- Sources: Last entry from the UK AIP originally at NATS

Bourn Airport (IATA: n/a, ICAO: EGSN) is located 7 NM (13 km; 8.1 mi) west of Cambridge, Cambridgeshire, England. The airfield was originally constructed during World War II as RAF Bourn and was principally used as a base for heavy bombers - Wellingtons, Stirlings and Lancasters were all based at Bourn at one time or another. Nowadays, the airfield is used for recreational use, and flight training has been provided by the Bourn Rural Flying Corps for in excess of 30 years.

The airfield is owned by the Taylor Family.

== Development ==
The airfield is allocated for a new village of 3,500 homes in the South Cambridgeshire Local Plan.
