= List of airports in Bermuda =

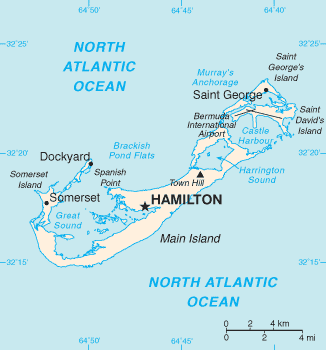
Map of Bermuda

This is a list of airports in Bermuda.

Bermuda, officially the Bermuda Islands, is a British overseas territory in the North Atlantic Ocean. Located off the east coast of the United States, its nearest landmass is Cape Hatteras, North Carolina, about 1,030 kilometres (640 mi) to the west-northwest. It is about 1,373 km (853 mi) south of Halifax, Nova Scotia, Canada, and 1,770 km (1,100 mi) northeast of Miami, Florida. The territory consists of approximately 138 islands, with a total area of 71.7 km^{2} (27.7 sq. mi.). Its capital city is Hamilton.

== Airports ==
Parish	Island	ICAO	IATA	Airport name	Coordinates
Current airport
St. George's	St. David's Island	TXKF	BDA	L.F. Wade International Airport (formerly Bermuda Int'l)	32°21′51″N 064°40′43″W
Former military airports
St. George's	St. David's Island			Kindley AFB (1948–1970) / NAS Bermuda (1970–1995)	32°21′51″N 064°40′43″W
Sandys	Boaz Island			RNAS Boaz Island (HMS Malabar) (1939–1944)	32°18′31″N 064°51′06″W

== See also ==
- Transport in Bermuda
- List of airports by ICAO code: T#TX - Bermuda
- List of airports in the United Kingdom and the British Crown Dependencies
- Wikipedia:WikiProject Aviation/Airline destination lists: North America#Bermuda (United Kingdom)
