= List of airports in Saint Kitts and Nevis =

List of airports in Saint Kitts and Nevis, sorted by location.

== List ==
Location	ICAO	IATA	Airport name	Coordinates
Basseterre, Saint Kitts	TKPK	SKB	Robert L. Bradshaw International Airport	17°18′41″N 062°43′07″W
Charlestown, Nevis	TKPN	NEV	Vance W. Amory International Airport	17°12′20″N 62°35′24″W

== See also ==
- Transport in Saint Kitts and Nevis
- List of airports by ICAO code: T#TK - Saint Kitts and Nevis
- Wikipedia: WikiProject Aviation/Airline destination lists: North America#Saint Kitts and Nevis
