= Cardiff Heliport =

Heliport in Cardiff, Wales

Cardiff Heliport Cardiff City Heliport

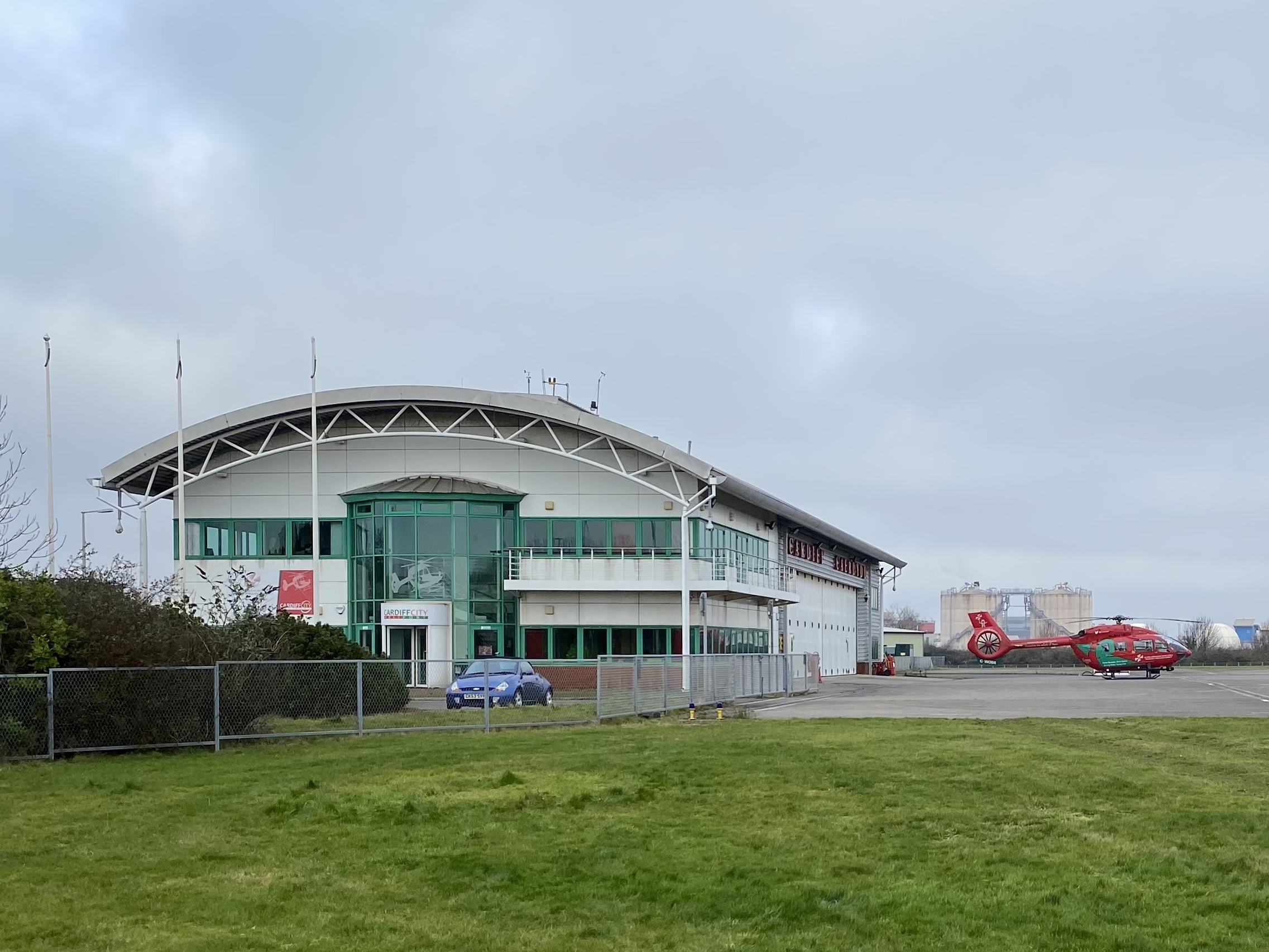
- IATA: None; ICAO: EGFC

Summary
- Airport type: Private
- Owner: Cardiff Council
- Operator: Wales Air Ambulance
- Serves: Cardiff
- Location: Foreshore Road, Cardiff. CF10 4LZ
- Coordinates: 51°28′03″N 003°08′15″W
- Website: www.cardiffheliport.com

Map
- Location in Cardiff

Runways
Direction	Length		Surface
Direction	ft	m	Surface
20/02	984	300	Grass

Cardiff Heliport (Welsh: Maes Hofrenyddion Caerdydd), (ICAO: EGFC) is a heliport located in Tremorfa, Cardiff, Wales, approximately 2 miles (3.2 km) from the city centre.

== History ==
Julian Verity, founder of helicopter charter business Veritair lobbied Cardiff South MP and Prime Minister, Jim Callaghan, for support and funds to establish a dedicated heliport for the Welsh capital. Veritair was based at Cardiff Airport at the time. The facility was opened in 1984, near to the current Tremorfa site, next to the Cardiff industrial docklands. The site was relocated ahead of the 1999 Rugby World Cup, including the addition of the current terminal with conference facilities. The airport was owned by Cardiff City Council, and operated Veritair Utilities Division of British International Helicopters. The facility became increasingly popular during major events at the Principality Stadium, particularly during the redevelopment of Wembley Stadium, when the venue hosted football finals such as the FA Cup. Episodes of the popular BBC television series, Doctor Who, have been filmed at the heliport. The heliport was heavily utilised during the 2014 NATO summit, which included Gulf Aviation supporting a significantly higher than normal jet fuel use.

British International Helicopters were acquired by Coventry Airport operator, Rigby Group, in 2013. In 2014, the group withdrew from their operating contract, and all helicopters were removed from the site. In April 2016, the heliport reopened when Huw Evans and Roy Steptoe signed a 50 year lease agreement. The heliport was heavily utilised when Cardiff hosted the 2017 UEFA Champions League Final between Juventus and Real Madrid. Direct flights by dignatries, and a shuttle between Bristol Airport and the heliport increased traffic to over 150 flights.

Since 2018, the lease and operation of the site has been held by Wales Air Ambulance. The Wales Air Ambulance fleet operate a number of helicopters at the site, including an Airbus EC135 complete with in-flight incubators to transport babies.

== Accidents and incidents ==
- 21 April 2000: A Eurocopter AS355F2 (registered G-SAEW) used by South Wales Police, based at Cardiff Heliport, crashed during a live police exercise in pursuit of a stolen vehicle. The helicopter was written off, after landing on a property in Cardiff.

== See also ==
- Cardiff Airport - International airport located near to Cardiff Heliport in Rhoose
