= Isle of Wight/Sandown Airport =

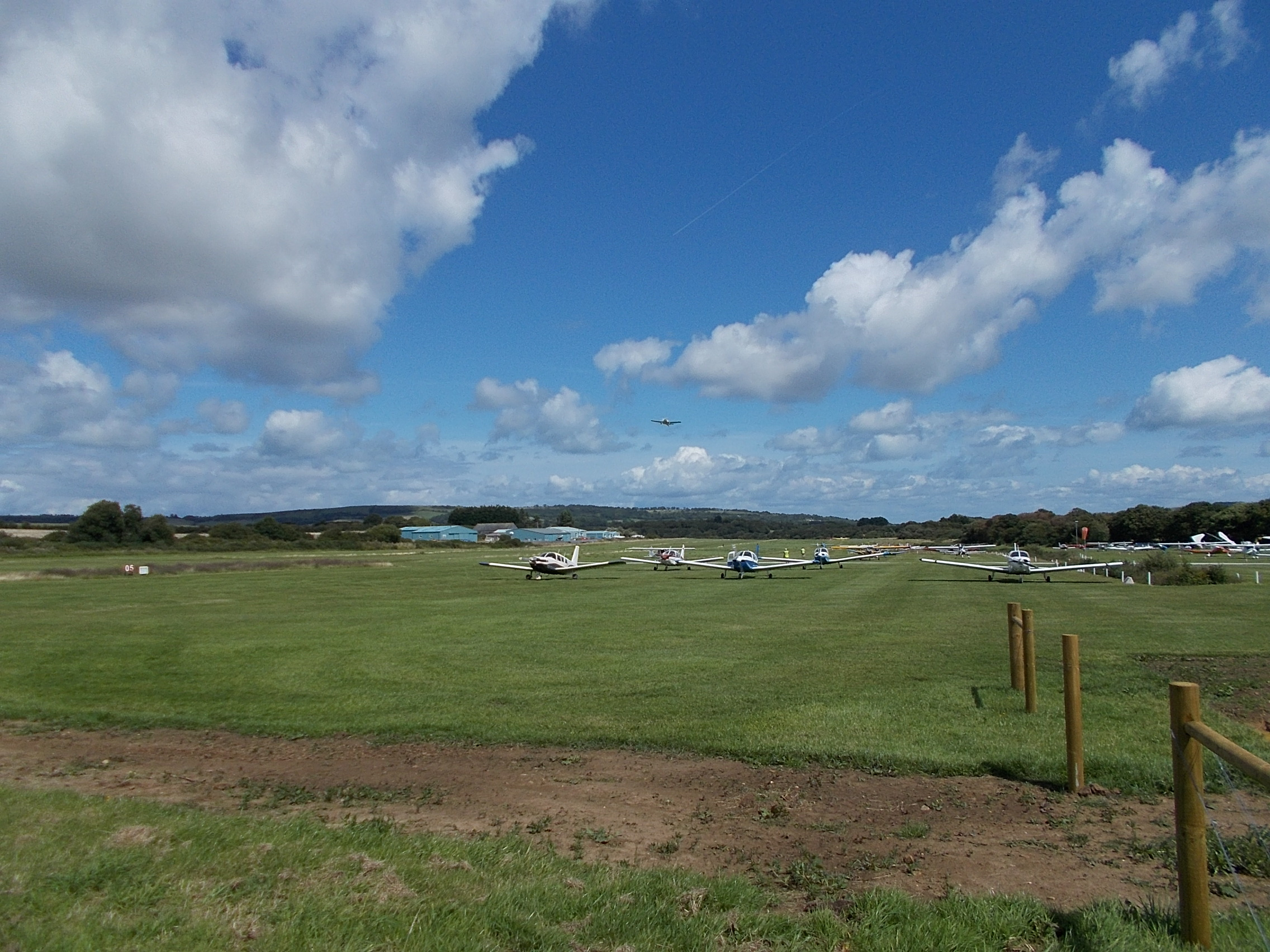
- IATA: none; ICAO: EGHN

Summary
- Airport type: Public
- Operator: Isle of Wight Airport Ltd
- Serves: Isle of Wight
- Location: Sandown
- Elevation AMSL: 55 ft (17 m)
- Coordinates: 50°39′11″N 001°10′56″W
- Website: www.eghn.org.uk

Map
- Location on the Isle of Wight

Runways
Direction	Length		Surface
Direction	m	ft	Surface
05/23	884	2,900	Grass

Statistics
- Sources: Isle of Wight/Sandown Airport

Isle of Wight/Sandown Airport (ICAO: EGHN) is an unlicensed aerodrome located 1 nautical mile (1.9 km; 1.2 mi) west of Sandown, Isle of Wight, England. It is close to the village of Lake.

Isle of Wight Sandown Aerodrome formerly had a CAA Ordinary Licence (Number P883) that allows flights for the public transport of passengers or for flying instruction as authorised by the licensee (Isle of Wight Aviation Limited).

== Recent history ==
On 25 August 2025, a helicopter crashed after taking off from Sandown Airport. The incident killed three people, and the only survivor was seriously injured.
