= Guadeloupe =

Overseas department and region of France

Guadeloupe Gwadloup (Guadeloupean Creole French) Karukera (Arawakan languages)
- Overseas department and region of France and outermost region of the European Union
- Region of Guadeloupe; Réjyon Gwadloup
- Logo
- Nicknames: Karukera, Butterfly Island, Land of Champions
- Location in the Lesser Antilles

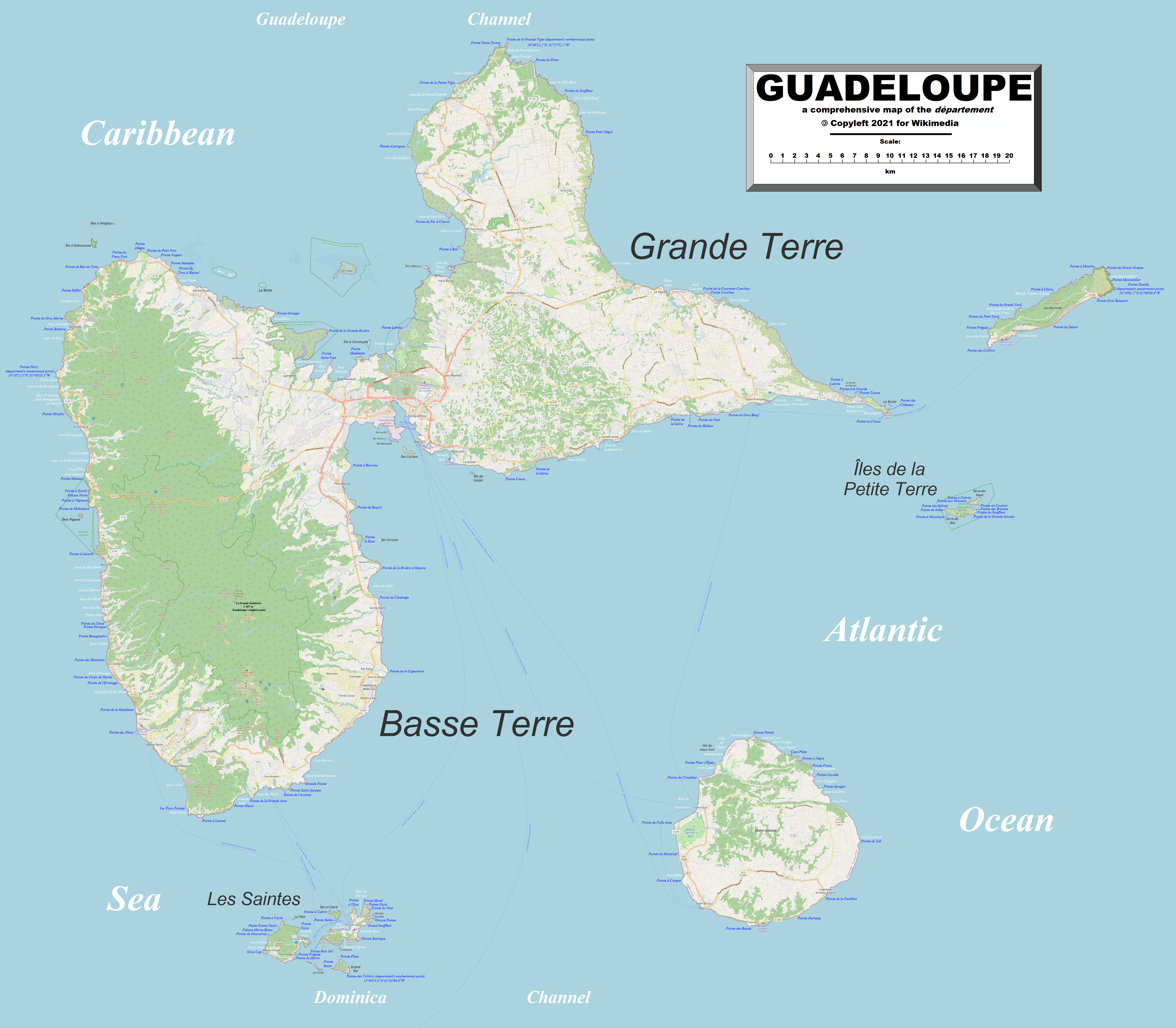
- Map of mainland Guadeloupe
- Coordinates: 16°15′N 61°30′W
- Sovereign state: France
- Regional Capital: Basse-Terre
- Largest metropolitan area: Pointe-à-Pitre
- French colony: 1648
- British occupation: 1759
- Restitution to France: 10 February 1763
- Second British occupation: 1782
- Second restitution to France: 30 May 1814 ^{a}
- Communes: 32

Government
  - President of the Departmental Council: Guy Losbar
  - President of the Regional Council: Ary Chalus

Area
  - Total: 1,628 km^{2} (629 sq mi)
  - Rank: 16th region
- Highest elevation (La Grande Soufriere): 1,467 m (4,813 ft)

Population (1 January 2024)
  - Total: 378,561
  - Density: 232.5/km^{2} (602.3/sq mi)
  - Ethnic groups: 75% Afro-Caribbean/Mulatto; 11% European/Béké; 9% Indian; 3% Arab; 2% Chinese/others
  - Religion: 95.87% Christianity; 85.87% Catholicism; 7.10%% Protestantism; 0.50% Hinduism; 0.37% Islam; 0.36% Baháʼí; 2.48% irreligion; 2.9% other
- Demonym: Guadeloupean

Languages
  - Official: French
  - Regional: Guadeloupean French Creole

GDP
  - Total: €11.878 billion (2024)
  - Per capita: €28,760 (2024)
- Time zone: UTC−4:00 (AST)
- Area code: +590
- ISO 3166 code: GP; FR-971
- Internet TLD: .fr; .gp
- Currency: Euro (€) (EUR)
- Website: www.lesilesdeguadeloupe.com www.guadeloupe.pref.gouv.fr www.nic.gp
- ^{a} Not effective until 1816.

Guadeloupe (Note: /ˌɡwɑːdəˈluːp/ GWAHD-ə-LOOP; French: [ɡwad(ə)lup]; Guadeloupean Creole French: Gwadloup [ɡwadlup]) is an overseas department and region of France in the Caribbean. It consists of six inhabited islands—Basse-Terre, Grande-Terre, Marie-Galante, La Désirade, and two Îles des Saintes—and 30 uninhabited islets and 3 inhabited islets. It is south of Antigua and Barbuda and Montserrat and north of Dominica. The capital city is Basse-Terre, on the southern west coast of Basse-Terre Island; the most populous city is Les Abymes and the main centre of business is neighbouring Pointe-à-Pitre, both on Grande-Terre Island. It had a population of 395,726 in 2024.

Like the other overseas departments, it is an integral part of France. As a constituent territory of the European Union (EU) and the eurozone, the euro is its official currency and any EU citizen is free to settle and work there indefinitely, but it is not part of the Schengen Area. It included Saint Barthélemy and Saint Martin until 2007, when they were detached from Guadeloupe following a 2003 referendum.

Christopher Columbus visited Guadeloupe in 1493 and gave the island its name, after Guadalupe, Cáceres. The native language is Guadeloupean Creole known as "Kréyòl Gwadloup"; the official language is French, spoken by 84% of the population.

== Etymology ==
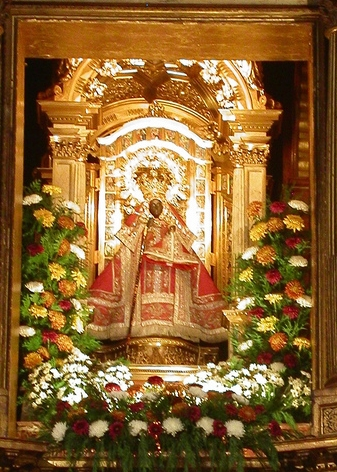
Our Lady of Guadalupe in the Monastery of Santa María de Guadalupe, after whom the island gets its name

The archipelago was called Karukera (or 'The Island of Beautiful Waters') by the Indigenous Arawakan-speaking people.

Christopher Columbus named the island Santa María de Guadalupe in 1493 after Our Lady of Guadalupe, a shrine to the Virgin Mary venerated in the Spanish town of Guadalupe, Extremadura. When the area became a French colony, the Spanish name was retained – though altered to French orthography and phonology. The islands are locally known as Gwada.

== History ==
=== Pre-colonial era ===
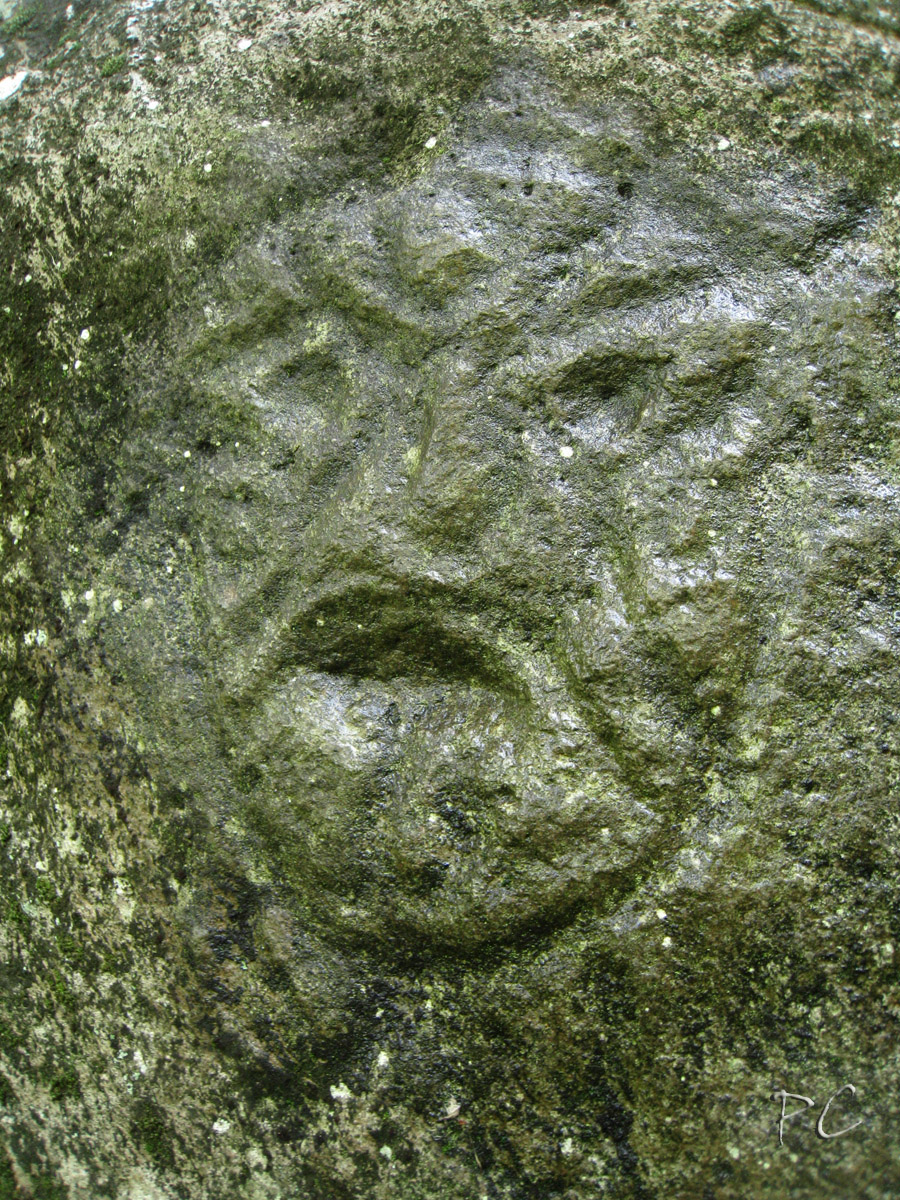
Ancient petroglyph in Baillif

The islands were first populated by Indigenous peoples of the Americas, possibly as far back as 3000 BC. The Arawak people are the first identifiable group, but they were later displaced by Kalinagos.

The Morel site in Le Moule, Grande-Terre, is one of numerous archaeological sites in Guadeloupe where pre-Columbian artefacts have been found, and is now an archaeological park open to the public. A skeleton found at Morel, sometimes known as the "Woman of Guadeloupe", caused a scientific furore in the 19th century, when initial reports suggested that it dated from the Miocene – long before modern humans are thought to have evolved. However, after examining the specimen and the "stone" that it was embedded in, Georges Cuvier concluded that what had been taken for Miocene stone was a concretion of hardened sand, dating from relatively recent times. Artefacts are still being discovered at the site, and range from 400 BC to 1400 AD.

=== 15th–17th centuries ===
Christopher Columbus was the first European to see Guadeloupe, landing in November 1493 and giving it its current name. Several attempts at colonisation by the Spanish in the 16th century failed due to Native peoples defending their land from outsiders. In 1626, the French, under the trader and adventurer Pierre Belain d'Esnambuc, began to take an interest in Guadeloupe, expelling Spanish settlers. The Compagnie des Îles de l'Amérique settled in Guadeloupe in 1635, under the direction of the French colonial leaders Charles Liénard de L'Olive and Jean du Plessis d'Ossonville; they formally stole the island for France and brought in French farmers to colonise the land. This led to the death of many Indigenous people by disease and violence. By 1640, however, the Compagnie des Îles de l'Amérique had gone bankrupt, and they thus sold Guadeloupe to Charles Houël du Petit Pré who began plantation agriculture, with the first African slaves arriving in 1650. Slave resistance was immediately widespread, with an open uprising in 1656 lasting several weeks and a simultaneous spate of mass desertions that lasted at least two years until the French compelled indigenous peoples to stop assisting them. Ownership of the island passed to the French West India Company before it was annexed to France in 1674 under the tutelage of their Martinique colony. Institutionalised slavery, enforced by the Code Noir from 1685, led to a booming sugar plantation economy.

=== 18th–19th centuries ===
During the Seven Years' War, British forces captured and occupied the islands until the 1763 Treaty of Paris. During that time, Pointe-à-Pitre became a major harbour, and markets in British America were opened to Guadeloupean sugar, which was traded for foodstuffs and timber. The economy expanded quickly, creating vast wealth for the French colonists. So prosperous was Guadeloupe at the time that, under the 1763 Treaty of Paris, France forfeited its Canadian colonies in exchange for the return of Guadeloupe. Coffee planting began in the late 1720s, also worked by slaves and, by 1775, cocoa had become a major export product as well.

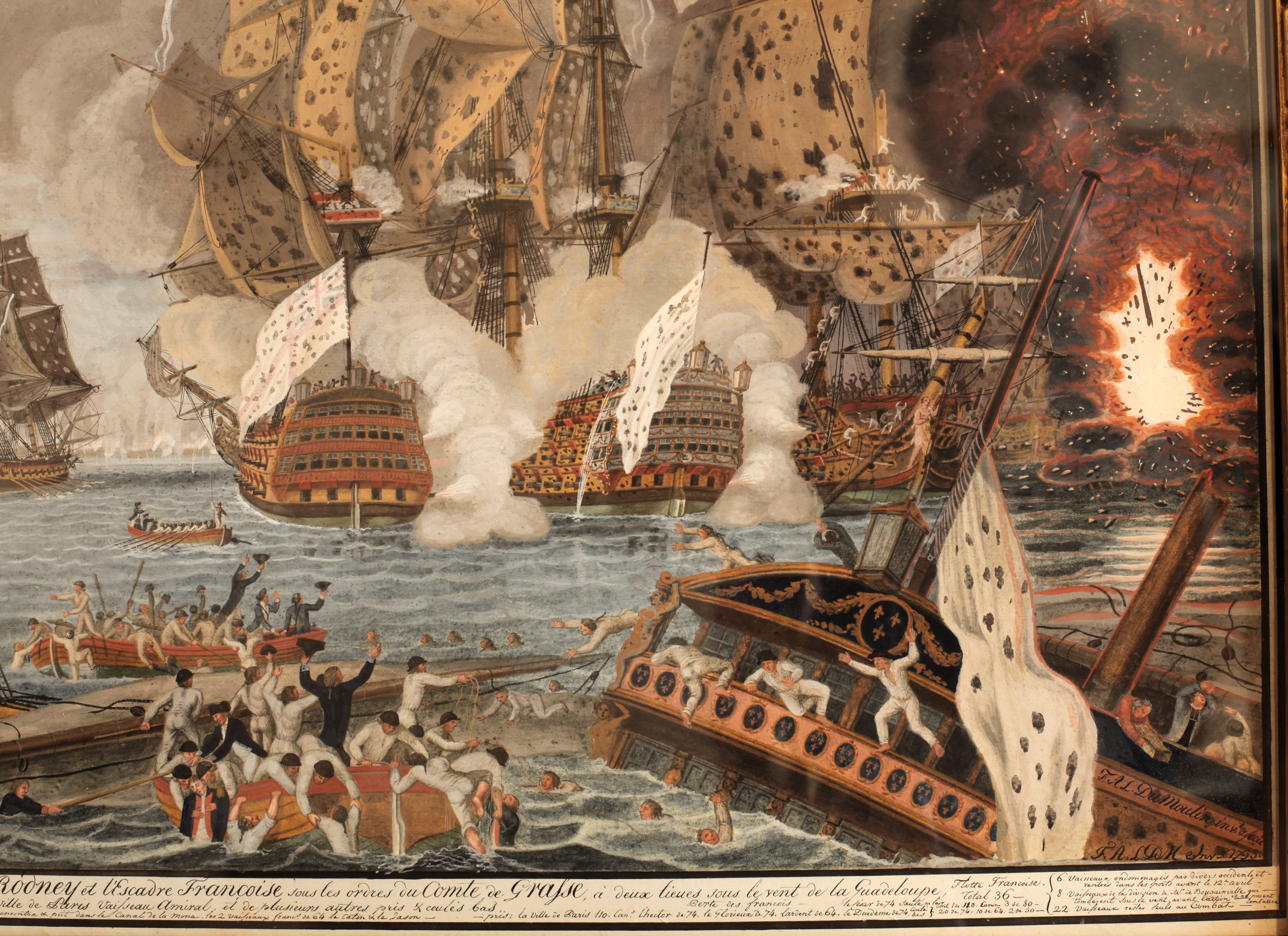
The Battle of the Saintes was fought between France and Britain in 1782.

The French Revolution brought chaos to Guadeloupe. Under new revolutionary law, freedmen were entitled to equal rights. Taking advantage of the chaotic political situation, Britain captured Guadeloupe in 1794. The French responded by sending an expeditionary force under Victor Hugues, which retook the colony by December and abolished slavery. More than 1,000 French colonists were killed in the aftermath.

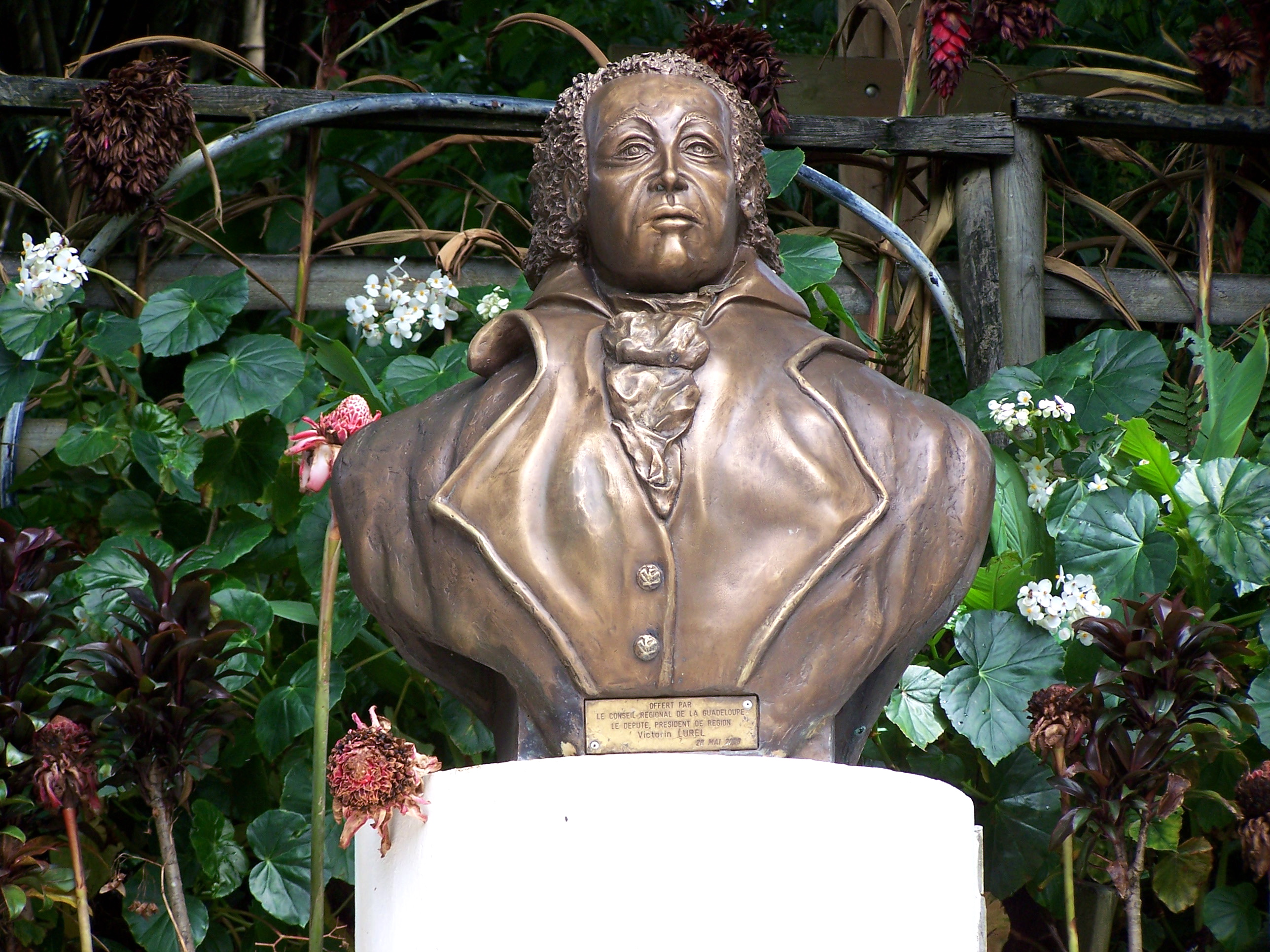
Bust of Louis Delgrès, leader of the 1802 slave rebellion

In 1802, a French expeditionary force under Antoine Richepanse arrived in Guadeloupe, prompting a rebellion led by black officers who had until then been the de facto rulers of the colony. Richepanse and his troops acted quickly against the rebels, culminating in the Battle of Matouba on 28 May 1802. Realising they had no chance of success, Louis Delgrès and his followers committed mass suicide by deliberately exploding their gunpowder stores. A consular decree published on 6 July 1802 discreetly ordered the reestablishment of slavery in Guadeloupe. An insurgency against the French, who officially reestablished slavery in Guadeloupe on 14 May 1803, continued until 1804. In 1810, the British captured the island again, ceding it to Sweden under the 1813 Treaty of Stockholm. However, the Swedes never took formal possession of the island, which remained under British military occupation.

In the 1814 Treaty of Paris, Sweden ceded Guadeloupe to France, giving rise to the Guadeloupe Fund. In 1815, the Treaty of Vienna acknowledged French control of Guadeloupe.

Slavery was abolished in the French Empire in 1848, though the island's landed interests imposed strict regulations on the rights of emancipated slaves to "support themselves as subsistence farmers, work irregularly, and to change jobs freely". After 1854, indentured labourers from the French colony of Pondicherry, and, with permission from the British government, India more broadly, were brought in: some 41,000 total. Emancipated slaves then earned the right to vote in 1849.

=== 20th–21st centuries ===
French nationality and the vote were granted to Indian citizens in 1923, when a long campaign, led by Henry Sidambarom, finally achieved success.In 1936, Félix Éboué became the first black governor of Guadeloupe. During World War II, Guadeloupe initially came under the control of the Vichy government, later joining Free France in 1943. In 1946, the colony of Guadeloupe became an overseas department of France.

Tensions arose in the post-war era over the social structure of Guadeloupe and its relationship with mainland France. The 'Massacre of St Valentine' occurred in 1952, when striking factory workers in Le Moule were shot at by the Compagnies républicaines de sécurité, resulting in four deaths. In May 1967 racial tensions exploded into rioting following a racist attack on a black Guadeloupean, Raphael Balzinc, resulting in eight deaths.

An independence movement grew in the 1970s, prompting France to declare Guadeloupe a French region in 1974. The Union populaire pour la libération de la Guadeloupe (UPLG) campaigned for complete independence, and by the 1980s the situation had turned violent with the actions of groups such as Groupe de libération armée (GLA) and Alliance révolutionnaire caraïbe (ARC).

Greater autonomy was granted to Guadeloupe in 1982. Through a referendum in 2003, Saint-Martin and Saint Barthélemy voted to separate from the administrative jurisdiction of Guadeloupe, this being fully enacted by 2007.

In January 2009, labour unions and others known as the Liyannaj Kont Pwofitasyon went on strike for more pay. Strikers were angry with low wages, the high cost of living, high levels of poverty relative to mainland France and levels of unemployment that are amongst the worst in the European Union. The situation quickly escalated, exacerbated by what was seen as an ineffectual response by the French government, turning violent and prompting the deployment of extra police after a union leader (Jacques Bino) was shot and killed. The strike lasted 44 days and had also inspired similar actions on nearby Martinique. President Nicolas Sarkozy later visited the island, promising reform. Tourism suffered greatly during this time and affected the 2010 tourist season as well.

== Geography ==
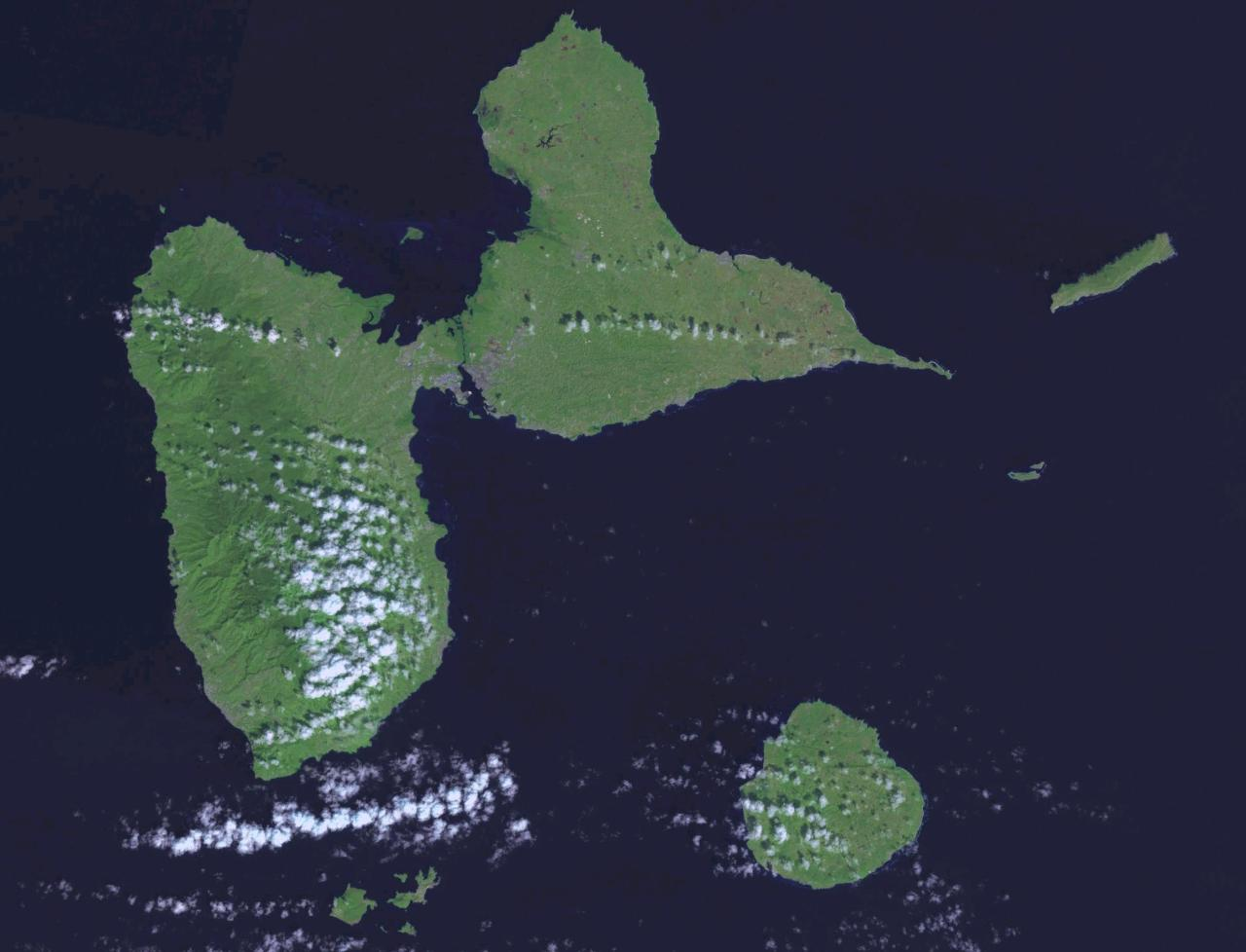
Satellite photo of Guadeloupe

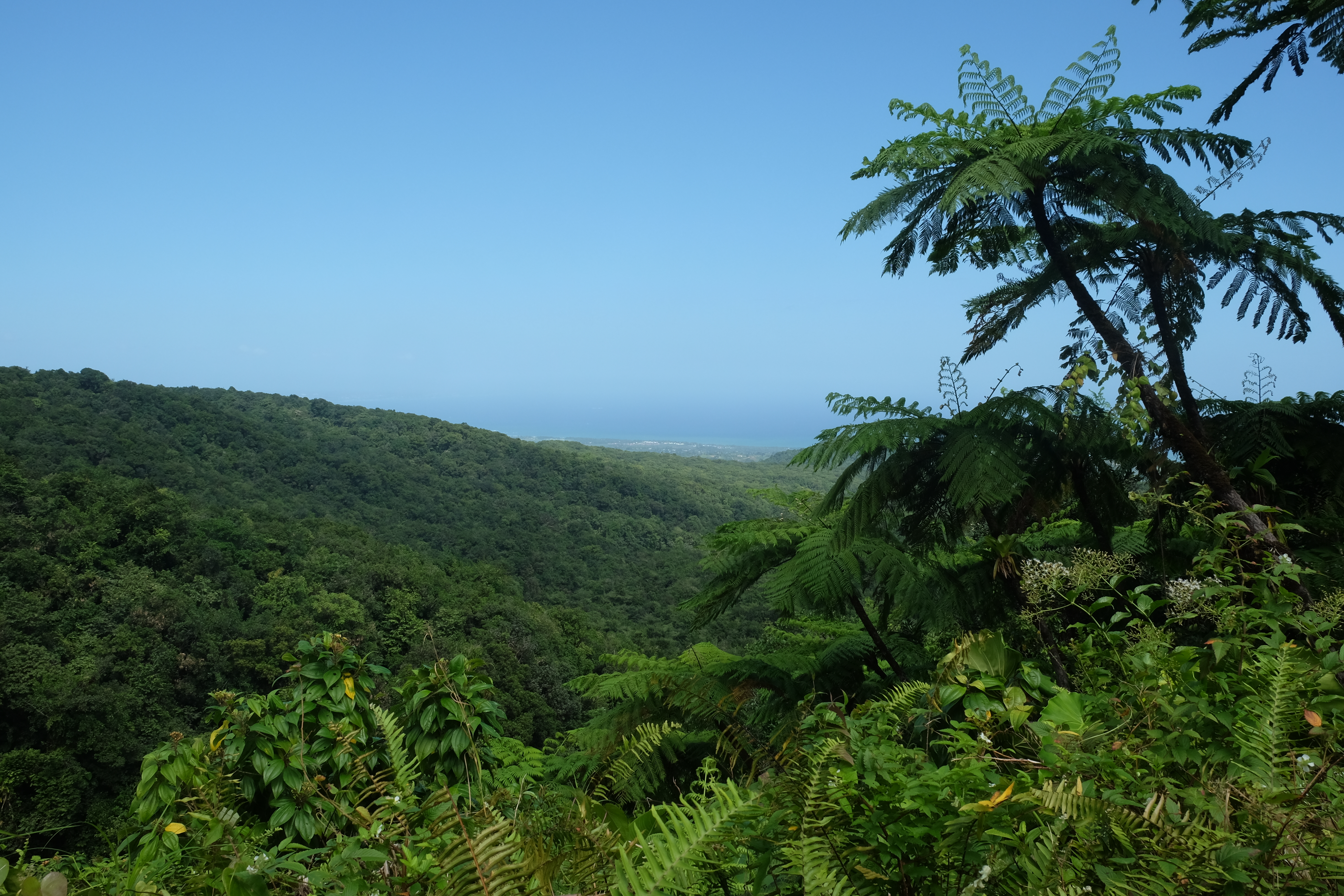
Lush forest on Basse-Terre

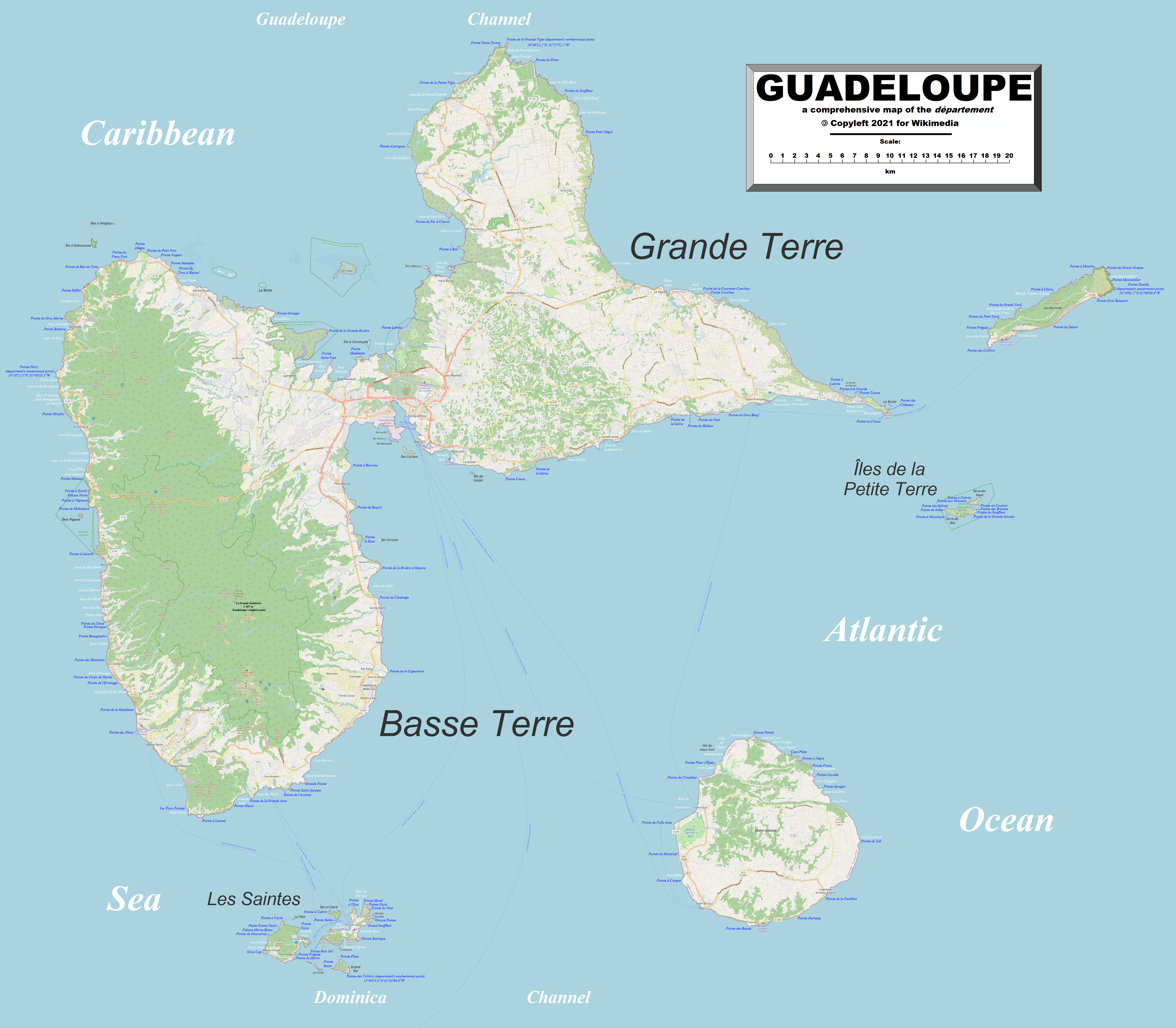
Detailed map of Guadeloupe

Guadeloupe is an archipelago of more than 12 islands, as well as islets and rocks situated where the northeastern Caribbean Sea meets the western Atlantic Ocean. It is located in the Leeward Islands in the northern part of the Lesser Antilles, a partly volcanic island arc. To the north lie Antigua and Barbuda and the British Overseas Territory of Montserrat, with Dominica lying to the south.

The two main islands are Basse-Terre (west) and Grande-Terre (east), which form a butterfly shape as viewed from above, the two 'wings' of which are separated by the Grand Cul-de-Sac Marin, Rivière Salée and Petit Cul-de-Sac Marin. More than half of Guadeloupe's land surface consists of the 847.8 km^{2} (327¼ sq. mi.) Basse-Terre. The island is mountainous, containing the peaks of Mount Sans Toucher (1,354 m; 4,442 ft) and Grande Découverte (1,263 m; 4,143 ft), culminating in the active volcano La Grande Soufrière, the highest mountain peak in the Lesser Antilles with an elevation of 1,467 metres (4,813 ft). In contrast Grande-Terre is mostly flat, with rocky coasts to the north, irregular hills at the centre, mangrove at the southwest, and white sand beaches sheltered by coral reefs along the southern shore. This is where the main tourist resorts are found.

Marie-Galante is the third-largest island, followed by La Désirade, a north-east slanted limestone plateau, the highest point of which is 275 metres (902 ft). To the south lie the Îles de Petite-Terre, which are two islands (Terre de Haut and Terre de Bas) totalling 2 km^{2} (¾ sq. mi.).

Les Saintes is an archipelago of eight islands of which two, Terre-de-Bas and Terre-de-Haut are inhabited. The landscape is similar to that of Basse-Terre, with volcanic hills and irregular shoreline with deep bays.

There are 30 uninhabited islets and 3 inhabited islets around the two main islands and near Les Saintes.

Gosier Islet, Caret Islet, Fajou Islet, Cochon Islet, Fortune Islet, Tome Islet, Rat Islet, Duberran Islet, Macou Islet, La Biche, Kahouanne Islet, Pigeon Islets, Blanc Islet, Le Boyer Islet, Îlet des Petits Pompons, Îlet Haie Bébel, Îlet Mangue à Laurette, Îlet aux Fous and Carénage Islet, around the Saintes: Cabrit Islet, Grand Islet, Les Augustins, La Coche, Le Paté, La Vierge and Islet Roches Percées, the two islets of Petite Terre: Terre de haut and Terre de bas, and another Cabrit Islet and Islet à Nègre (off Petit-Bourg) are all uninhabited.

Feuille Islet, Boissard Islet and Chasse Islet are the only inhabited islets of the archipelago.

=== Geology ===
Basse-Terre is a volcanic island. The Lesser Antilles are at the outer edge of the Caribbean Plate, and Guadeloupe is part of the outer arc of the Lesser Antilles Volcanic Arc. Many of the islands were formed as a result of the subduction of oceanic crust of the Atlantic Plate under the Caribbean Plate in the Lesser Antilles subduction zone. This process is ongoing and is responsible for volcanic and earthquake activity in the region. Guadeloupe was formed from multiple volcanoes, of which only La Grande Soufrière is not extinct. Its last eruption was in 1976, and led to the evacuation of the southern part of Basse-Terre. 73,600 people were displaced before the eruption, although the eventual damage was much less than feared. Some of the drama of the evacuation was captured in the 1977 documentary La Soufrière by German filmmaker Werner Herzog.

K–Ar dating indicates that the three northern massifs on Basse-Terre Island are 2.79 million years old. Sections of volcanoes collapsed and eroded within the last 650,000 years, after which the Sans Toucher volcano grew in the collapsed area. Volcanoes in the north of Basse-Terre Island mainly produced andesite and basaltic andesite. There are several beaches of dark or "black" sand.

La Désirade, east of the main islands, has a basement from the Mesozoic, overlaid with thick limestones from the Pliocene to Quaternary periods.

Grande-Terre and Marie-Galante have basements probably composed of volcanic units of Eocene to Oligocene, but there are no visible outcrops. On Grande-Terre, the overlying carbonate platform is 120 metres (400 feet) thick.

=== Climate ===
The islands are part of the Leeward Islands, so called because they are downwind of the prevailing trade winds, which blow out of the northeast. This was significant in the days of sailing ships. Grande-Terre is so named because it is on the eastern, or windward side, exposed to the Atlantic winds. Basse-Terre is so named because it is on the leeward south-west side and sheltered from the winds. Guadeloupe has a tropical climate tempered by maritime influences and the Trade Winds. There are two seasons, the dry season called "Lent" from January to June, and the wet season called "winter", from July to December.

Climate data for Guadeloupe
Month	Jan	Feb	Mar	Apr	May	Jun	Jul	Aug	Sep	Oct	Nov	Dec	Year
Mean daily maximum °C (°F)	29.1 (84.4)	29.1 (84.4)	29.4 (84.9)	30.1 (86.2)	30.7 (87.3)	31.3 (88.3)	31.5 (88.7)	31.6 (88.9)	31.5 (88.7)	31.2 (88.2)	30.5 (86.9)	29.6 (85.3)	30.5 (86.9)
Daily mean °C (°F)	24.5 (76.1)	24.5 (76.1)	24.9 (76.8)	25.9 (78.6)	26.9 (80.4)	27.5 (81.5)	27.6 (81.7)	27.7 (81.9)	27.4 (81.3)	27.0 (80.6)	26.3 (79.3)	25.2 (77.4)	26.3 (79.3)
Mean daily minimum °C (°F)	19.9 (67.8)	19.9 (67.8)	20.4 (68.7)	21.7 (71.1)	23.1 (73.6)	23.8 (74.8)	23.8 (74.8)	23.7 (74.7)	23.3 (73.9)	22.9 (73.2)	22.1 (71.8)	20.9 (69.6)	22.1 (71.8)
Average precipitation mm (inches)	84 (3.3)	64 (2.5)	73 (2.9)	123 (4.8)	148 (5.8)	118 (4.6)	150 (5.9)	198 (7.8)	236 (9.3)	228 (9.0)	220 (8.7)	137 (5.4)	1,779 (70.0)
Average precipitation days	15.0	11.5	11.5	11.6	13.6	12.8	15.4	16.2	16.6	18.1	16.6	15.7	174.6
Mean monthly sunshine hours	235.6	229.1	232.5	240.0	244.9	237.0	244.9	248.0	216.0	217.0	207.0	223.2	2,775.2
Source: Hong Kong Observatory

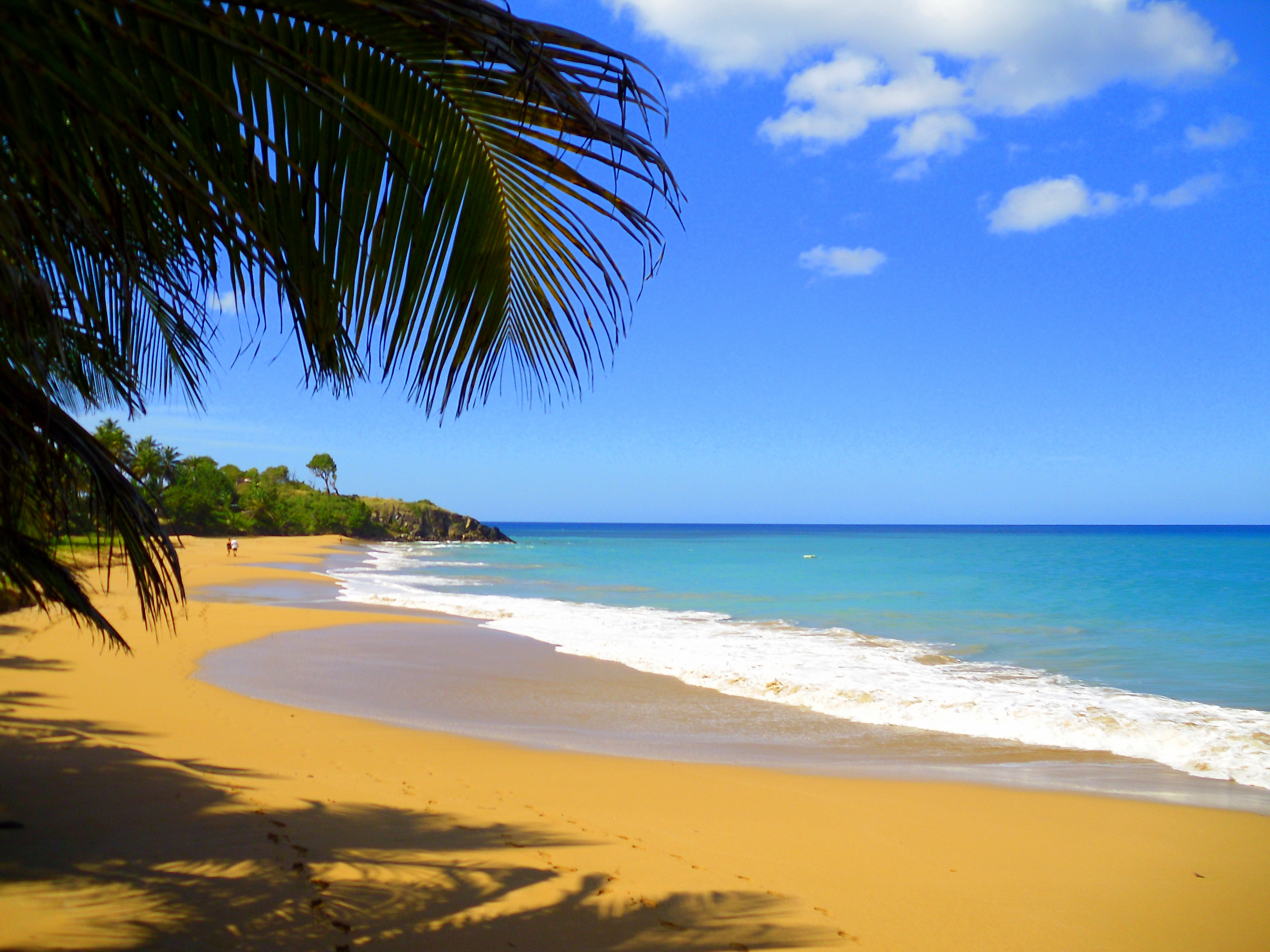
Grande Anse Beach

=== Tropical cyclones and storm surges ===
Located in a very exposed region, Guadeloupe and its dependencies have to face many cyclones. The deadliest hurricane to hit Guadeloupe was the Pointe-à-Pitre hurricane of 1776, which killed at least 6,000 people.

In 1989, Hurricane Hugo caused severe damage to the islands of the archipelago and left a deep mark on the memory of the local inhabitants. In 1995, three hurricanes (Iris, Luis and Marilyn) hit the archipelago in less than three weeks. Other notable hurricanes include Okeechobee in 1928, Betsy in 1965, Cleo in 1964, Inez in 1966, and Irma and Maria in 2017.

=== Flora ===
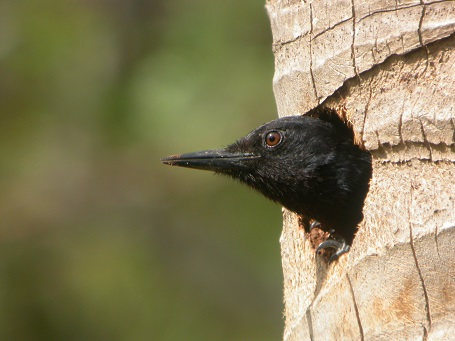
The Guadeloupe woodpecker is endemic to the islands.

With fertile volcanic soils, heavy rainfall and a warm climate, vegetation on Basse-Terre is lush. Most of the island's forests are on Basse-Terre, containing such species as mahogany, ironwood and chestnut trees. Mangrove swamps line the Salée River. Much of the forest on Grande-Terre has been cleared, with only a few small patches remaining.

Between 300 and 1,000 metres (980 and 3,280 ft) of altitude, the rainforest that covers a large part of the island of Basse-Terre develops. Vegetation there includes the white gum tree, the acomat-boucan or chestnut tree, the marbri or bois-bandé or the oleander; shrubs and herbaceous plants such as the mountain palm, the balisier or ferns; many epiphytes: bromeliads, philodendrons, orchids and lianas. Above 1,000 m (3,300 ft), the humid savannah develops, composed of mosses, lichens, sphagnum or more vigorous plants such as mountain mangrove, high altitude violet or mountain thyme.

The dry forest occupies a large part of the islands of Grande-Terre, Marie-Galante, Les Saintes, La Désirade and also develops on the leeward coast of Basse-Terre. The coastal forest is more difficult to develop because of the nature of the soil (sandy, rocky), salinity, sunshine and wind and is the environment where the sea grape, the mancenilla (a very toxic tree whose trunk is marked with a red line), the icaquier or the Coconut tree grow. On the cliffs and in the Arid zones are found cacti such as the cactus-cigar (Cereus), the prickly pear, the chestnut cactus, the "Tête à l'anglais" cactus and the aloes.

The Mangrove forest that borders some of Guadalupe's coasts is structured in three levels, from the closest to the sea to the farthest. On the first level are the red mangroves; on the second, about 10 metres (33 ft) from the sea, the black mangroves form the shrubby mangrove; on the third level the white mangroves form the tall mangrove. Behind the mangrove, where the tide and salt do not penetrate, a swamp forest sometimes develops, unique in Guadeloupe. The representative species of this environment is the Mangrove-medaille.

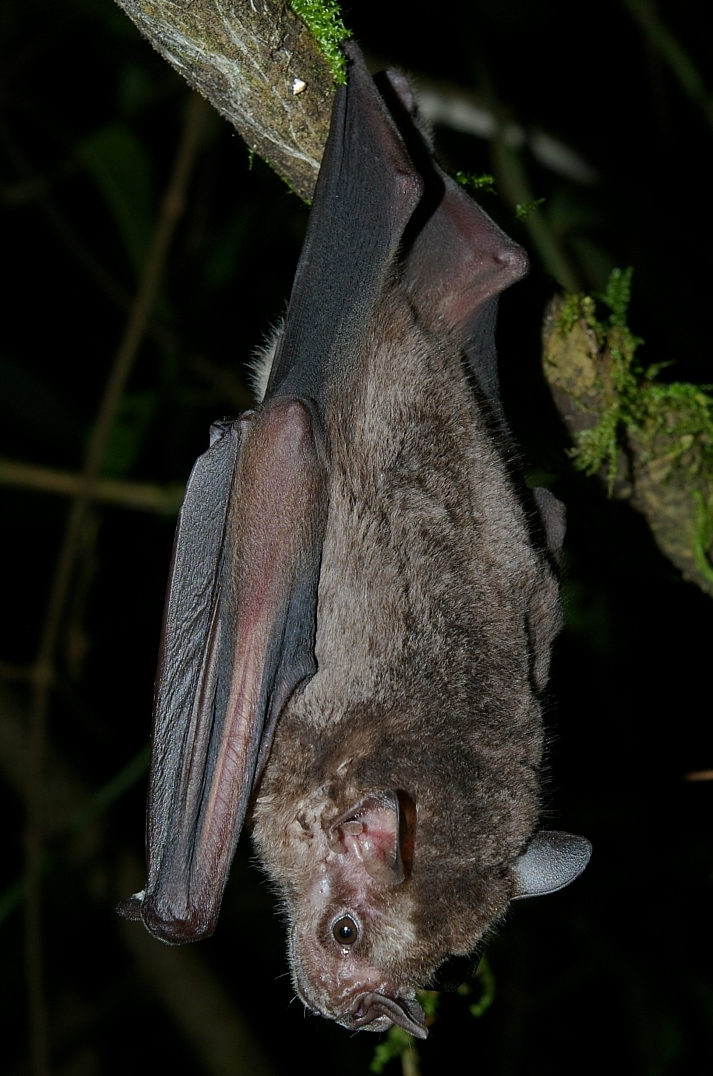
The Jamaican fruit bat can be found throughout the department.

=== Fauna ===
Few terrestrial mammals, aside from bats and raccoons, are native to the islands. The introduced Javan mongoose is also present on Guadeloupe. Bird species include the endemic purple-throated carib and the Guadeloupe woodpecker. The waters of the islands support a rich variety of marine life.

However, by studying 43,000 bone remains from six islands in the archipelago, it was found that 50 to 70% of snakes and lizards on the Guadeloupe Islands became extinct after European colonists arrived; they had brought with them mammals such as cats, mongooses, rats, and raccoons, which might have preyed upon the native reptiles.

=== Environmental preservation ===
In recent decades, Guadeloupe's natural environments have been affected by hunting and fishing, forest retreat, urbanization and suburbanization. They also suffer from the development of intensive crops (banana and sugar cane, in particular), which reached their peak in the years 1955–75. This has led to the following situation: seagrass beds and reefs have degraded by up to 50% around the large islands; mangroves and mantids have almost disappeared in Marie-Galante, Les Saintes and La Désirade; the salinity of the fresh water table has increased due to "the intensity of use of the layer"; and pollution of agricultural origin (pesticides and nitrogenous compounds).

In addition, the ChlEauTerre study, unveiled in March 2018, concludes that 37 different anthropogenic molecules (more than half of which come from residues of now-banned pesticides, such as chlordecone) were found in "79% of the watersheds analyzed in Grande-Terre and 84% in Basse-Terre." A report by the Guadeloupe Water Office notes that in 2019 there is a "generalized degradation of water bodies."

Despite everything, there is a will to preserve these environments whose vegetation and landscape are preserved in some parts of the islands and constitute a sensitive asset for tourism. These areas are partially protected and classified as ZNIEFF, sometimes with nature reserve status, and several caves are home to protected chiropterans.

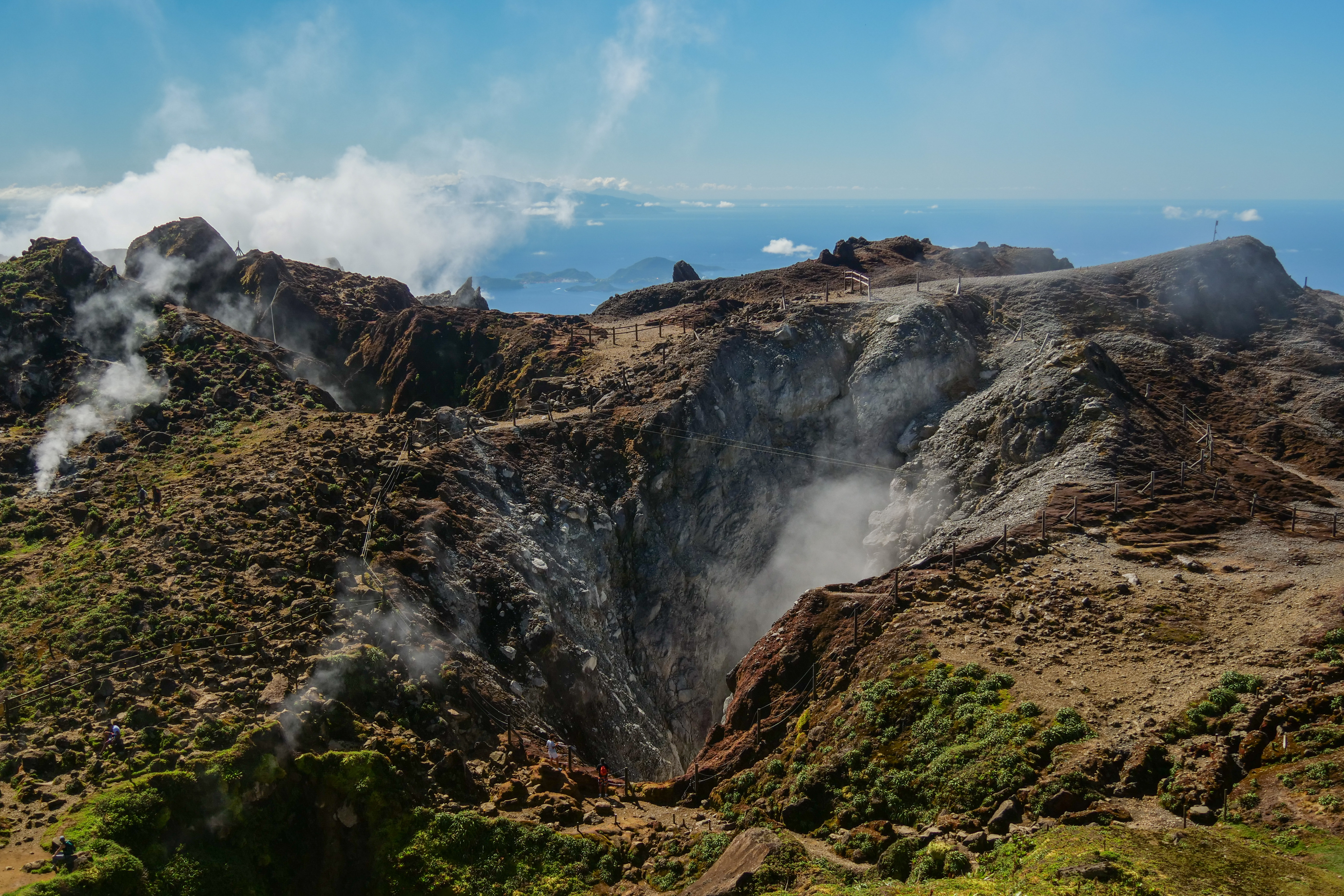
La Soufrière Volcano crater and its fumaroles

The Guadalupe National Park was created on 20 February 1989. In 1992, under the auspices of UNESCO, the Biosphere Reserve of the Guadeloupe Archipelago (Réserve de biosphère de l'archipel de la Guadeloupe) was created. As a result, on 8 December 1993, the marine site of Grand Cul-de-sac was listed as a wetland of international importance. The island thus became the overseas department with the most protected areas.

=== Earthquakes and tsunamis ===
The archipelago is crossed by numerous geological faults such as those of la Barre or la Cadoue, while in depth, in front of Moule and La Désirade begins the Désirade Fault, and between the north of Maria-Galante and the south of Grande-Terre begins the Maria Galante Fault. Because of these geological characteristics, the islands of the department of Guadeloupe are classified in zone III according to the seismic zoning of France and are subject to a specific risk prevention plan.

The 1843 earthquake in the Lesser Antilles is, to this day, the most violent earthquake known. It caused the death of more than a thousand people, as well as major damage in Pointe-à-Pitre.

On 21 November 2004, the islands of the department, in particular Les Saintes archipelago, were shaken by a violent earthquake that reached a magnitude of 6.3 on the Richter scale and caused the death of one person, as well as extensive material damage.

=== Waterfalls ===
Guadeloupe is home to 100 waterfalls and cascades. Some of the most well-known or visited include Acomat Falls (Saut de l'Acomat), Carbet Falls (Chutes du Carbet), Crayfish Waterfall (Cascade aux Écrevisses), and Lézarde Falls (Saut de la Lézarde). All of the waterfalls are located on the island of Basse-Terre.

== Demographics ==
Historical population

Year	Pop.	±% p.a.
1954	223,675	—
1961	276,545	+2.96%
1967	305,312	+1.66%
1974	315,848	+0.49%
1982	317,269	+0.06%
1990	353,431	+1.36%

Year	Pop.	±% p.a.
1999	386,566	+1.00%
2007	400,584	+0.46%
2012	403,314	+0.14%
2017	390,253	−0.66%
2023	384,160	−0.26%

Source: INSEE (1967-2023)

The population of Guadeloupe was estimated to be 378,561 on 1 January 2024. The population is mainly Afro-Caribbean. European, Indian (Tamil, Telugu, and other South Indians) around 35,617, Lebanese around 9,000, Syrians around 10,000, and Chinese are all minorities. There is also a substantial population of Haitians in Guadeloupe who work mainly in construction and as street vendors. Basse-Terre is the political capital; however, the largest city and economic hub is Pointe-à-Pitre.

The population of Guadeloupe has been decreasing by 0.8% per year since 2013. In 2023 the average population density in Guadeloupe was 236 inhabitants per square kilometre (610/sq mi), which is very high in comparison to France's average of 108/km^{2} (280/sq mi). One third of the land is devoted to agriculture and all mountains are uninhabitable; this lack of space and shelter makes the population density even higher.

=== Major urban areas ===
The most populous urban unit (agglomeration) is Pointe-à-Pitre-Les Abymes, which covers 11 communes and 65% of the population of the department. The three largest urban units are:

Urban unit	Population (2019)
Pointe-à-Pitre-Les Abymes	249,815
Basse-Terre	50,104
Capesterre-Belle-Eau	25,362

=== Health ===
In 2011, life expectancy at birth was recorded at 77.0 years for males and 83.5 for females.

Medical centres in Guadeloupe include: University Hospital Centre (CHU) in Pointe-à-Pitre, Regional Hospital Centre (CHR) in Basse-Terre, and four hospitals located in Capesterre-Belle-Eau, Pointe-Noire, Bouillante and Saint-Claude.

The Institut Pasteur de la Guadeloupe, is located in Pointe-à-Pitre and is responsible for researching environmental hygiene, vaccinations, and the spread of tuberculosis and other mycobacteria.

=== Immigration ===
The relative wealth of Guadeloupe contrasts with the extreme poverty of several islands in the Caribbean region, which makes the community an attractive place for the populations of some of these territories. In addition, other factors, such as political instability and natural disasters, explain this immigration. As early as the 1970s, the first illegal immigrants of Haitian origin arrived in Guadeloupe to meet a need for labour in the agricultural sector; alongside this Haitian immigration, which is more visible because it is more numerous, Guadeloupe has also seen the arrival and settlement of populations from the island of Dominica and the Dominican Republic. In 2005, the prefecture, which represents the State in Guadeloupe, reported figures of between 50,000 and 60,000 foreigners in the department.

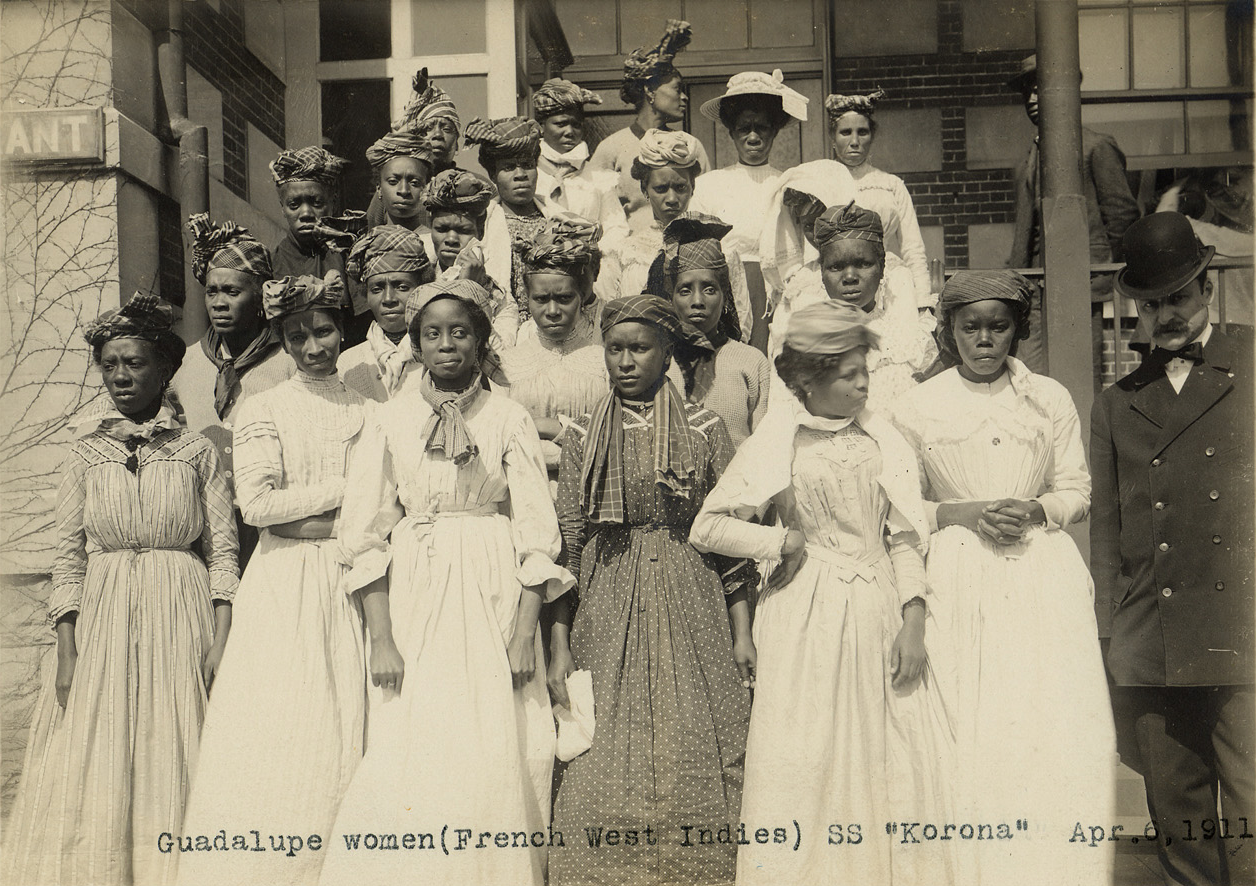
Guadeloupe women (1911) on Ellis Island.

=== Migration ===
Created in 1963 by Michel Debré, Bumidom's objective was to "[...] contribute to the solution of demographic problems in the overseas departments". To this end, its missions were multiple: information for future emigrants, vocational training, family reunification and management of reception centres. At the time, this project was also seen as a means to diminish the influence of the West Indian independence movements, which were gaining strength in the 1960s.

Between 1963 and 1981, an estimated 16,562 Guadeloupeans emigrated to metropolitan France through Bumidom. The miniseries Le Rêve français (The French Dream) sets out to recount some of the consequences of the emigration of West Indians and Reunionese to France.

An estimated 50,000 Guadeloupeans and Martinicans participated in the construction of the Panama Canal between 1904 and 1914. In 2014, it was estimated that there were between 60,000 and 70,000 descendants of these West Indians living in Panama. Other waves of migration to North America, especially to Canada, occurred at the beginning of the 20th century.

== Governance ==
Together with Martinique, La Réunion, Mayotte and French Guiana, Guadeloupe is one of the French overseas departments, being both a region and a department. It is also an outermost region of the European Union. The inhabitants of Guadeloupe are French citizens with full political and legal rights.

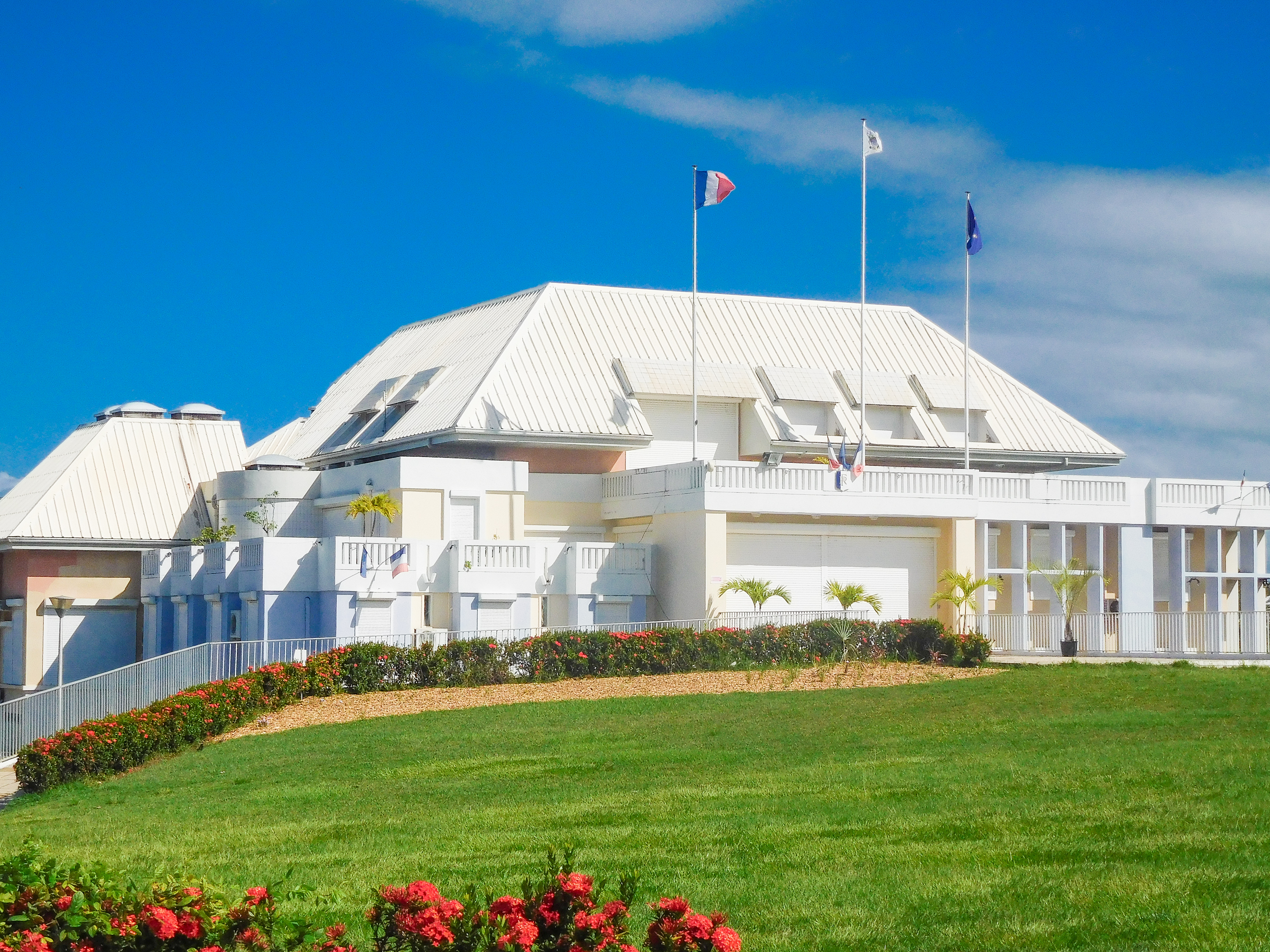
Goyave Town Hall

Legislative powers are centred on the separate departmental and regional councils. The elected president of the Departmental Council of Guadeloupe is currently Guy Losbar (1 July 2021); its main areas of responsibility include the management of a number of social and welfare allowances, of junior high school (collège) buildings and technical staff, and local roads and school and rural buses. The Regional Council of Guadeloupe is a body, elected every six years, consisting of a president (currently Ary Chalus) and eight vice-presidents. The regional council oversees secondary education, regional transportation, economic development, the environment, and some infrastructure, among other things.

Guadeloupe elects one deputy from one of each of the first, second, third, and fourth constituencies to the National Assembly of France. Three senators are chosen for the Senate of France by indirect election. For electoral purposes, Guadeloupe is divided into two arrondissements (Basse-Terre and Pointe-à-Pitre), and 21 cantons.

Most of the French political parties are active in Guadeloupe. In addition there are also regional parties such as the Guadeloupe Communist Party, the Progressive Democratic Party of Guadeloupe, the Guadeloupean Objective, the Pluralist Left, and United Guadeloupe, Solidary and Responsible.

The prefecture (regional capital) of Guadeloupe is Basse-Terre. Local services of the state administration are traditionally organised at departmental level, where the prefect represents the government.

=== Administrative divisions ===
For the purposes of local government, Guadeloupe is divided into 32 communes. Each commune has a municipal council and a mayor. Revenues for the communes come from transfers from the French government, and local taxes. Administrative responsibilities at this level include water management, civil register, and municipal police.

Name	Area (km^{2})	Population (2019)	Arrondissement	Map
Les Abymes	81.25	53,514	Pointe-à-Pitre	
Anse-Bertrand	62.5	4,001	Pointe-à-Pitre	
Baie-Mahault	46	30,837	Basse-Terre	
Baillif	24.3	5,203	Basse-Terre	
Basse-Terre	5.78	9,861	Basse-Terre	
Bouillante	43.46	6,847	Basse-Terre	
Capesterre-Belle-Eau	103.3	17,741	Basse-Terre	
Capesterre-de-Marie-Galante	46.19	3,298	Pointe-à-Pitre	
Deshaies	31.1	3,998	Basse-Terre	
La Désirade	21.12	1,419	Pointe-à-Pitre	
Le Gosier	45.2	26,489	Pointe-à-Pitre	
Gourbeyre	22.52	7,760	Basse-Terre	
Goyave	59.91	7,621	Basse-Terre	
Grand-Bourg	55.54	4,870	Pointe-à-Pitre	
Lamentin	65.6	16,354	Basse-Terre	
Morne-à-l'Eau	64.5	16,495	Pointe-à-Pitre	
Le Moule	82.84	22,149	Pointe-à-Pitre	
Petit-Bourg	129.88	24,753	Basse-Terre	
Petit-Canal	72	8,203	Pointe-à-Pitre	
Pointe-à-Pitre	2.66	15,181	Pointe-à-Pitre	
Pointe-Noire	59.7	6,031	Basse-Terre	
Port-Louis	44.24	5,618	Pointe-à-Pitre	
Saint-Claude	34.3	10,466	Basse-Terre	
Saint-François	61	11,689	Pointe-à-Pitre	
Saint-Louis	56.28	2,397	Pointe-à-Pitre	
Sainte-Anne	80.29	24,151	Pointe-à-Pitre	
Sainte-Rose	118.6	17,985	Basse-Terre	
Terre-de-Bas	6.8	975	Basse-Terre	
Terre-de-Haut	6	1,519	Basse-Terre	
Trois-Rivières	31.1	7,862	Basse-Terre	
Vieux-Fort	7.24	1,842	Basse-Terre	
Vieux-Habitants	58.7	7,110	Basse-Terre	

=== Geopolitics ===
From a geostrategic point of view, Guadeloupe is located in a central part of the Caribbean archipelago between the Atlantic Ocean and the Caribbean Sea. This location in the region allows France to reach a large part of the eastern coast of the American continent. The exclusive economic zone formed by Guadeloupe and Martinique covers just over 126,146 square kilometres (48,705 sq. mi.). In 1980 France established its maritime boundaries in the area by signing a Treaty with Venezuela.

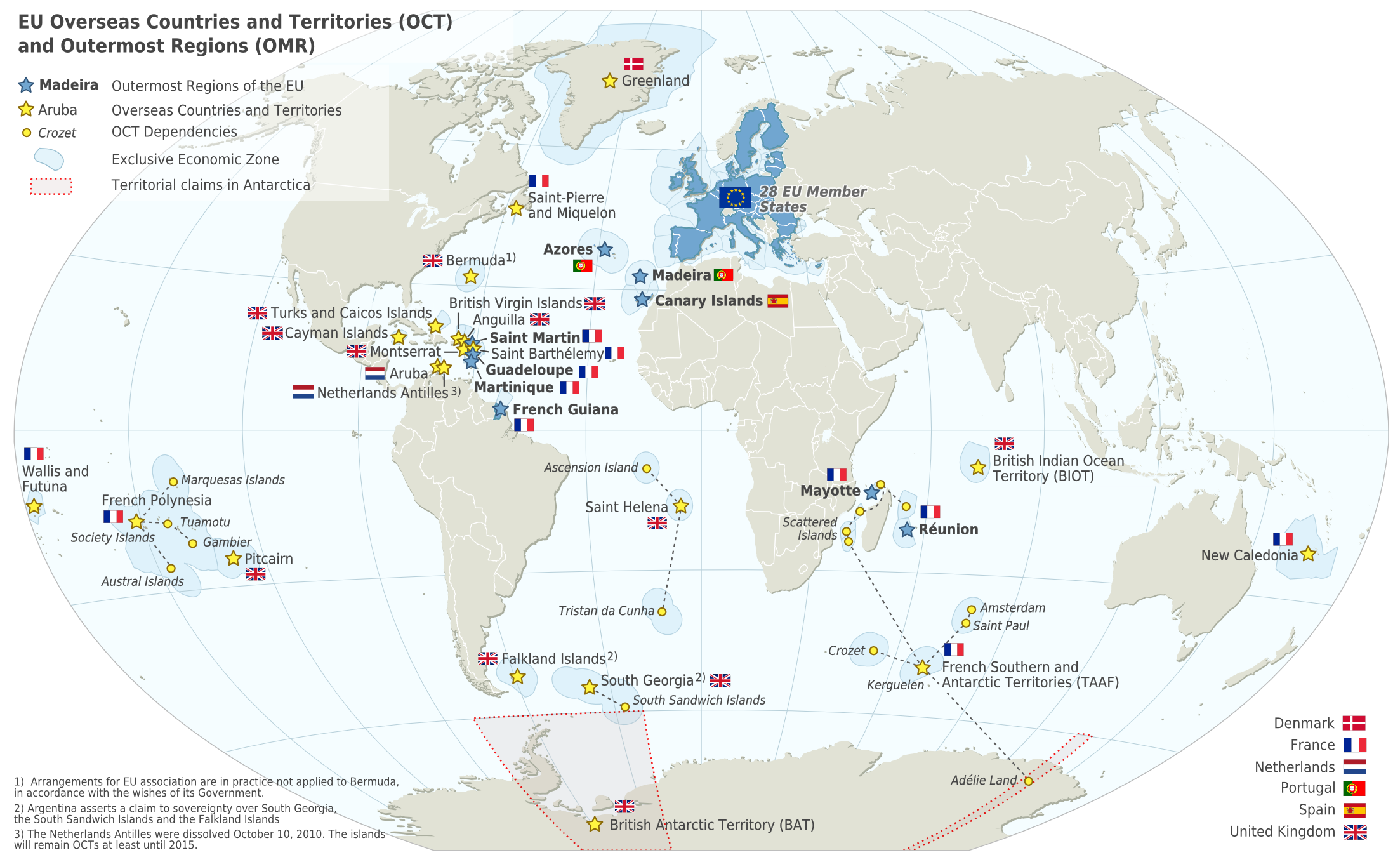
The special territories of the European Union

This offers France important fishing resources and independence to develop a sovereign policy of underwater research and protection (protection of humpback whales, Cousteau reserve, protection of coral reefs). Because of its geographical position, Guadeloupe allows France to participate in political and diplomatic dialogues at both the regional (Lesser and Greater Antilles) and continental (Latin and North America) levels.

The signing of the Regional Convention for the Internationalisation of Enterprise (CRIE), membership of the Economic Commission for Latin America and the Caribbean (ECLAC) and membership of the Association of Caribbean States (ACS) are milestones that have enabled Guadeloupe to develop its bilateral or multilateral relations within the framework of international agreements or institutions. The development of bilateral and multilateral economic partnerships with other Caribbean and American states is based on the modernisation of the autonomous port of Guadeloupe and the importance of the Guadeloupe-Polo Caribe international airport.

=== Symbols and flags ===
As a part of France, Guadeloupe uses the French tricolour as its flag and La Marseillaise as its anthem. However, a variety of other flags are also used in unofficial or informal contexts as the flag of Guadeloupe, most notably the sun-based flag. Independentists also have their own flag suggested by the People's Union for the Liberation of Guadeloupe.

National flag of France

Colonial flag of Guadeloupe

Red variant of the colonial sun flag

Flag used by the independence and the cultural movements

Flag with the logo of the Regional Council of Guadeloupe

== Economy ==
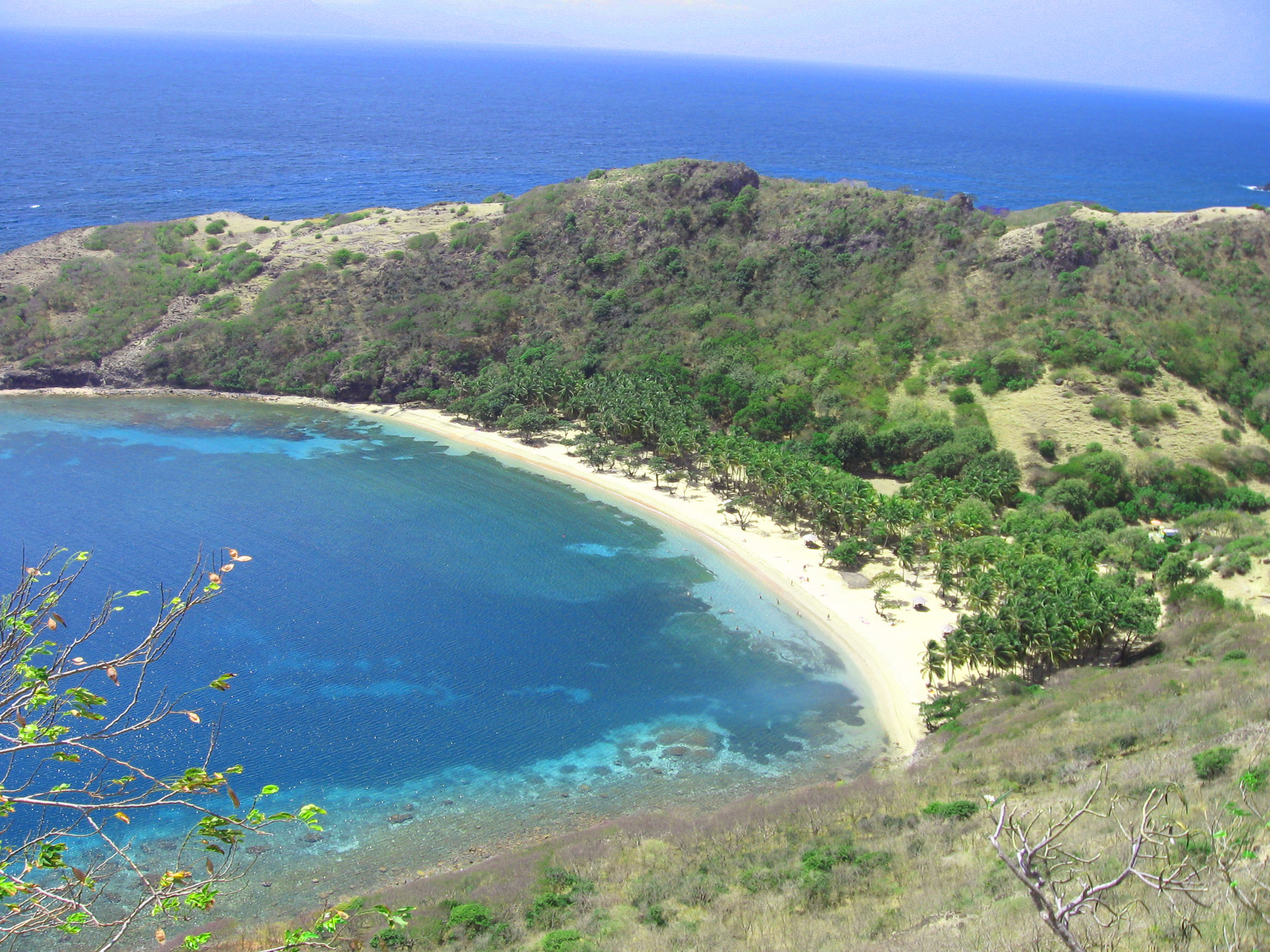
Plage de Pompierre, one of the many beaches on Guadeloupe that draw in tourists

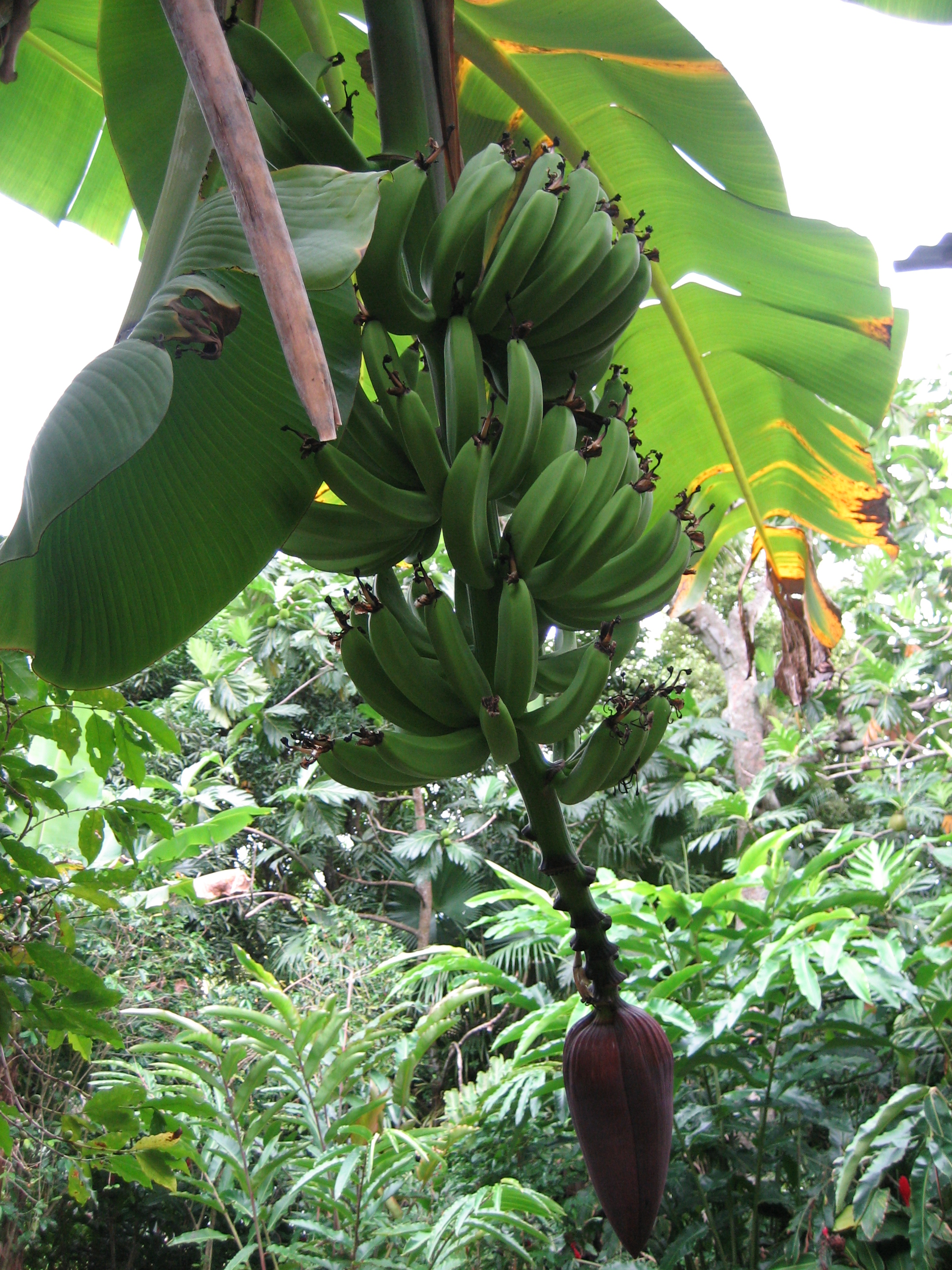
Banana plantations on Basse-Terre

The economy of Guadeloupe depends on tourism, agriculture, light industry and services. It is reliant upon mainland France for large subsidies and imports and public administration is the largest single employer on the islands. Unemployment is especially high among the youth population.

In 2017, the Gross domestic product (GDP) of Guadeloupe was €9.079 billion, and showed 3.4% growth. The GDP per capita of Guadeloupe was €23,152. Imports amounted to €3.019 billion, and exports to €1.157 billion. The main export products are bananas, sugar and rum. Banana exports suffered in 2017 from damages due to Hurricane Irma and Hurricane Maria.

=== Tourism ===
Tourism is one of the most prominent sources of income, with most visitors coming from France and North America. An increasingly large number of cruise ships visit Guadeloupe, the cruise terminal of which is in Pointe-à-Pitre. The popular British-French television series Death in Paradise (2011-2025) has helped to increase tourism in Guadeloupe. The show is set in the fictional Caribbean island of "Saint Marie", but the main filming for the show is done in the commune of Deshaies, on Basse-Terre Island in Guadeloupe.

=== Agriculture ===
The traditional sugar cane crop is slowly being replaced by other crops, such as bananas (which now supply about 50% of export earnings), eggplant, guinnep, noni, sapotilla, giraumon squash, yam, gourd, plantain, christophene, cocoa, jackfruit, pomegranate, and many varieties of flowers. Other vegetables and root crops are cultivated for local consumption, although Guadeloupe is dependent upon imported food, mainly from the rest of France.

=== Light industry ===
Of the various light industries, sugar and rum production, solar energy, cement, furniture and clothing are the most prominent. Most manufactured goods and fuel are imported.

== Culture ==
=== Language ===
Guadeloupe's official language is French, which is spoken by nearly all of the population. Most residents also speak Guadeloupean Creole, a French-based creole language.

Guadeloupean Creole emerged as a result of the need for all ethnic groups (French, African and Amerindian) to be able to understand each other. This language is therefore the result of a mixture created in the 17th century in response to a communicative emergency. At the time of the colony's foundation, a majority of the French population did not speak the standard French language but local dialects and languages, such as Breton and Norman, while the Africans came from a variety of West and Central African ethnic groups and lacked a common language themselves. The Creole language emerged as a lingua franca and ultimately became the native language of much of the population.

Moreover, Terre-de-Haut and Terre-de-Bas, in the Saintes archipelago, due to their settlement history (Breton, Norman and Poitevin settlers), have their own Creoles which differ from Guadeloupean Creole by their French pronunciations, their particular expressions, their syntax and their sonorities. Although it is not transcribed, these islanders call their Creole "patois" or "language of St. Martin" and actively ensure its transmission and perpetuation by their descendants in vernacular form.

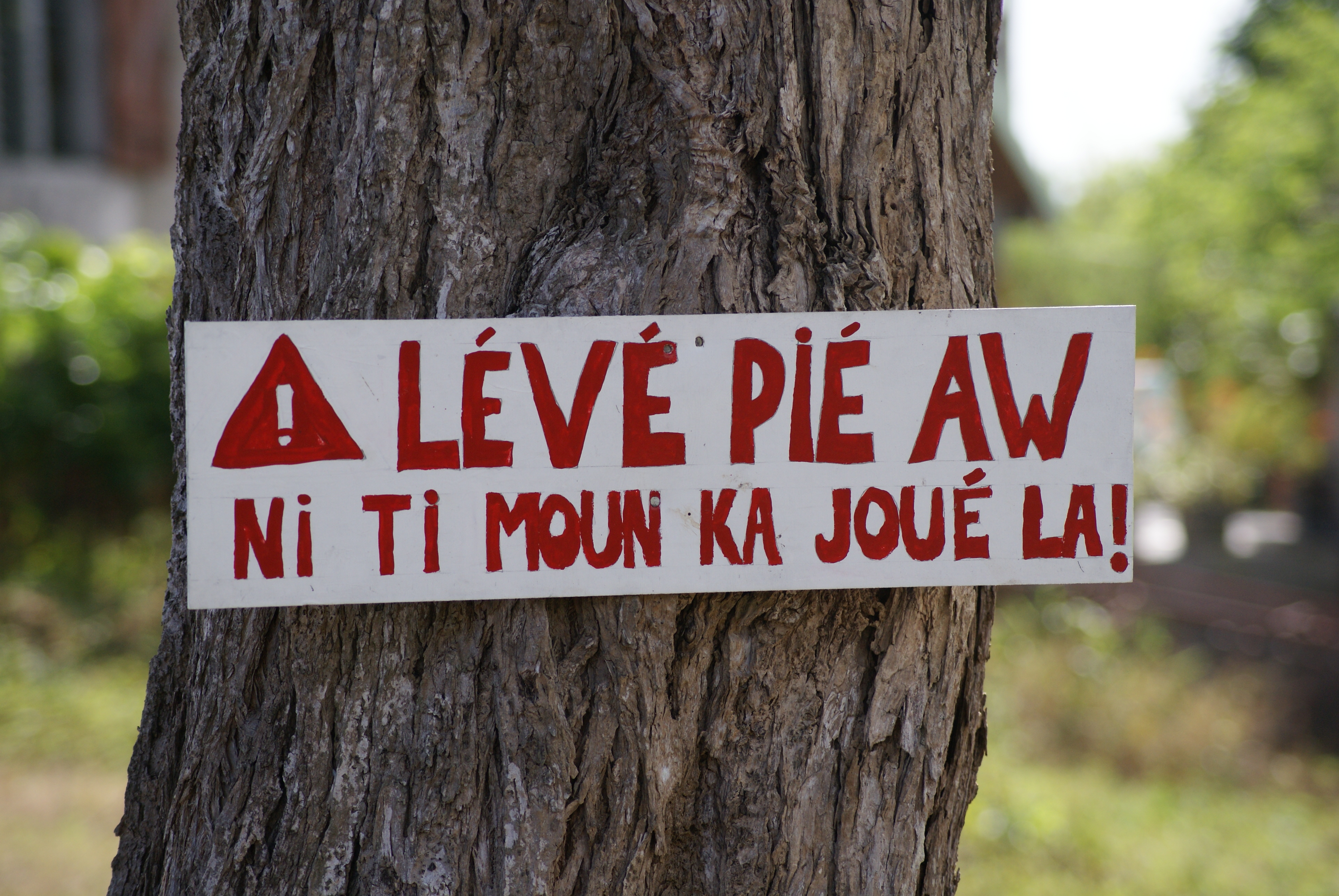
Warning sign written in Guadeloupe Creole

A Guadeloupean béké first wrote Creole at the end of the 17th century, transcribing it using French orthography.

As Guadeloupe is a French department, French is the official language. However, Guadeloupean French (in contact with Creole) has certain linguistic characteristics that differ from those of standard metropolitan French. Recently, a very detailed study of the phonetic aspect of Guadeloupean French has been undertaken (this would be the first study to deal with both the acoustic and the phonological and perceptual aspects of Guadeloupean French in particular and West Indian French in general). It is also concerned with the reading varieties of Guadeloupean French (acrolect, mesolect and basilect).

Since the 1970s and 1980s there has been a revival of Creole, which has stimulated the appearance of books of short stories and poetry published in Creole and French since the 1990s. In this context, Hector Poullet is a pioneer of Creole-mediated dictation. Creole is also a vibrant language and philosophical in its expressions and phrases, which, translated literally into French, can be confusing. The representatives of the older generations are not always fluent in French, but in Guadeloupean Creole.

Today, the question as to whether French and Creole are stable in Guadeloupe, i.e. whether both languages are practiced widely and competently throughout society, remains a subject of active research.

=== Religion ===
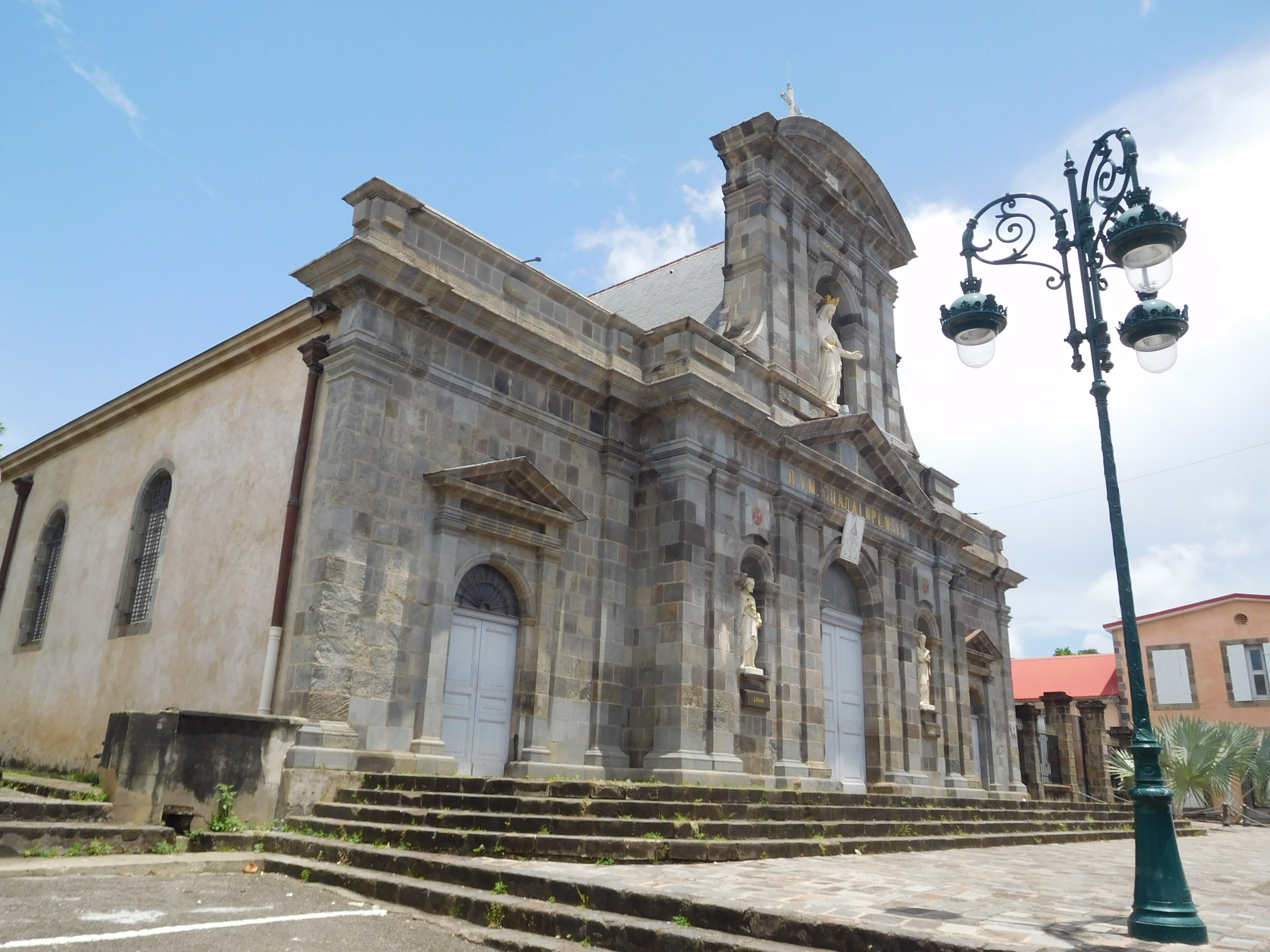
Cathédrale Notre-Dame de Guadeloupe

Figures in 2020 state that 96% of the population was Christian (of these, approximately 86% were Roman Catholic, 8% Protestant and 6% other Christian); of the other 4%, most were not religious. Guadeloupe is in the Catholic diocese of Basse-Terre (et Pointe-à-Pitre).

In 1685, the Black Code announced the Christian religion in its Catholic form as the only authorized religion in the French West Indies, thus excluding Jews and the various Protestant groups from practicing their beliefs, and imposed the forced conversion of the newly arrived slaves and the baptism of the older ones. Guadeloupe adopted the code on 10 December 1685.

This was followed by a rapid fashion among the slaves, since this religion offered them a spiritual refuge and allowed them to safeguard some of their African beliefs and customs, thus marking the beginning of a religious syncretism. Since the 1970s, new religions and groups have been 'competing' with the Catholic Church, such as the Evangelical Pentecostal Church, the Seventh-day Adventist Church, the Bible Students or Jehovah's Witnesses, and the Church of Jesus Christ of Latter-day Saints (Mormons).

Administratively, the territory of Guadeloupe is part of the Diocese of Basse-Terre and Pointe-à-Pitre, attached to the Catholic Church in France. The diocese includes the territories of Guadeloupe, St. Barthélemy and St. Martin and the number of faithful is estimated at 400,000. In 2020 there were 59 priests active in the diocese. The episcopal see is located in Basse-Terre, in the cathedral of Notre-Dame-de-Guadeloupe.

Hinduism, which accompanied the Indians who came to work in Guadeloupe in the mid-19th century, has expanded since the 1980s. The Indian community has its own tradition that comes from India. It is the mayé men, a distorted pronunciation of the name of the Tamil Indian goddess Mariamman. There are no less than 400 temples in the archipelago.

Islam was first Institutionalized in the French West Indies by the 1970s, first in Martinique. According to the president of the Muslim association of Guadeloupe, there are between 2,500 and 3,000 Muslims in the department. The island has two mosques. Judaism has been present in Guadeloupe since the arrival of Dutch settlers expelled from the northeast of present-day Brazil in 1654. There is a synagogue and an Israelite cultural community. Guadeloupeans of Syrian and Lebanese origin practice Catholicism in its Maronite form. Rastafari has been attractive to some young people since the 1970s following its emergence in Jamaica. The quimbois or kenbwa, practiced in Guadeloupe, refer to magical-religious practices derived from Christian and African syncretism.

=== Literature ===
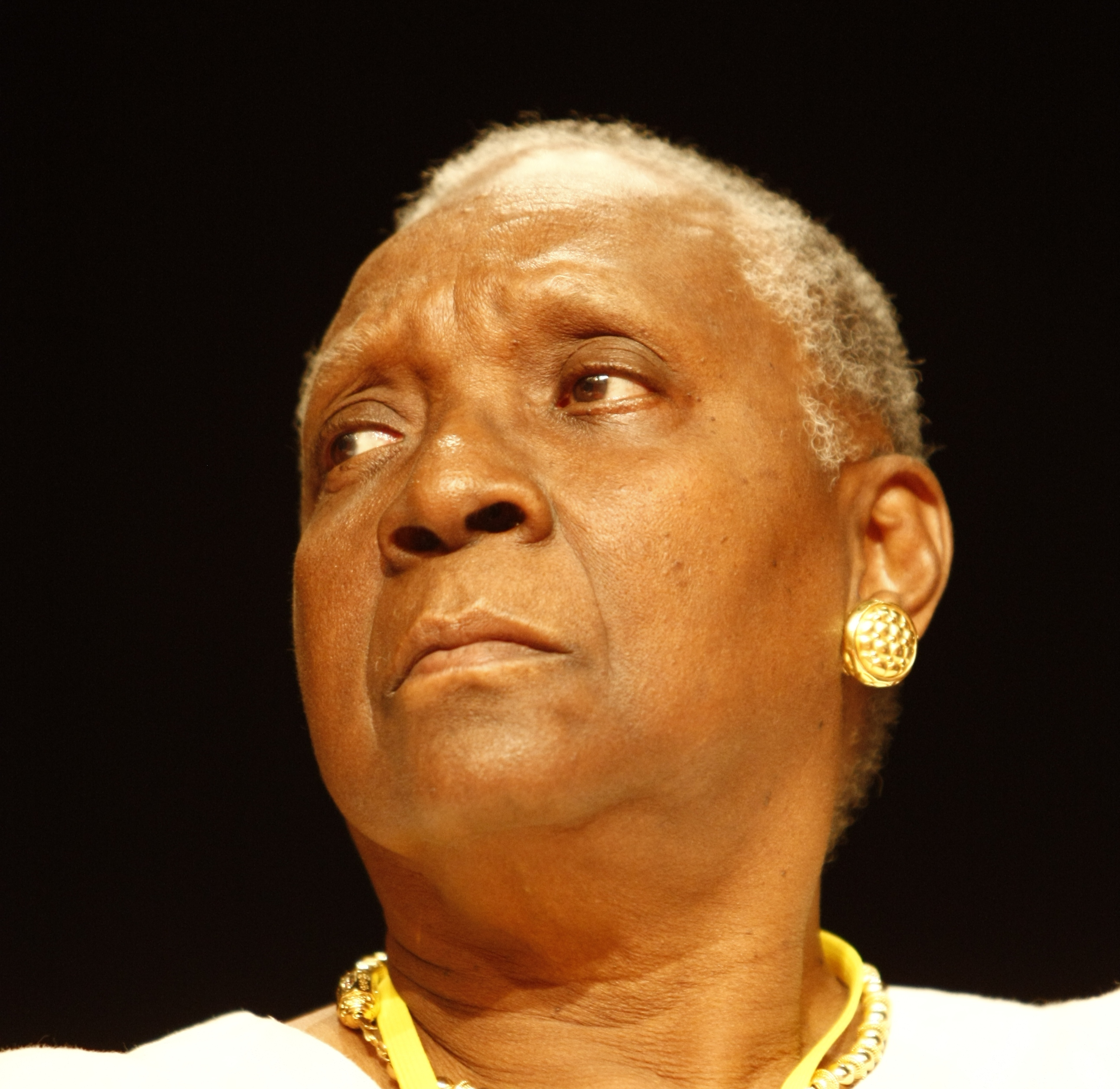
Maryse Condé, historical fiction author

Guadeloupe has always had a rich literary output, with Guadeloupean author Saint-John Perse winning the 1960 Nobel Prize in Literature. Other prominent writers from Guadeloupe or of Guadeloupean descent include Maryse Condé, Simone Schwarz-Bart, Myriam Warner-Vieyra, Oruno Lara, Daniel Maximin, Paul Niger, Guy Tirolien and Nicolas-Germain Léonard.

=== Music ===
Music and dance are also very popular, and the interaction of African, French and Indian cultures has given birth to some original new forms specific to the archipelago, most notably zouk music. Since the 1970s, Guadeloupean music has increasingly claimed the local language, Guadeloupean Creole as the preferred language of popular music. Islanders enjoy many local dance styles including zouk, zouk-love, compas, as well as the modern international genres such as hip hop, etc.

Traditional Guadeloupean music includes biguine, kadans, cadence-lypso, and gwo ka. Popular music artists and bands such as Experience 7, Francky Vincent, Kassav' (which included Patrick St-Eloi, and Gilles Floro) embody the more traditional music styles of the island, whilst other musical artists such as the punk band The Bolokos or Tom Frager focus on more international genres such as rock or reggae. Many international festivals take place in Guadeloupe, such as the Creole Blues Festival on Marie-Galante. All the Euro-French forms of art are also ubiquitous, enriched by other communities from Brazil, Dominican Republic, Haiti, India, Lebanon, Syria who have migrated to the islands.

Classical music has seen a resurgent interest in Guadeloupe. One of the first known composers of African origin was born in Guadeloupe, Le Chevalier de Saint-Georges, a contemporary of Joseph Haydn and Wolfgang Amadeus Mozart, and a celebrated figure in Guadeloupe. Several monuments and cites are dedicated to Saint-Georges in Guadeloupe, and there is an annual music festival, Festival International de Musique Saint-Georges, dedicated in his honour. The festival attracts classical musicians from all over the world and is one of the largest classical music festivals in the Caribbean.

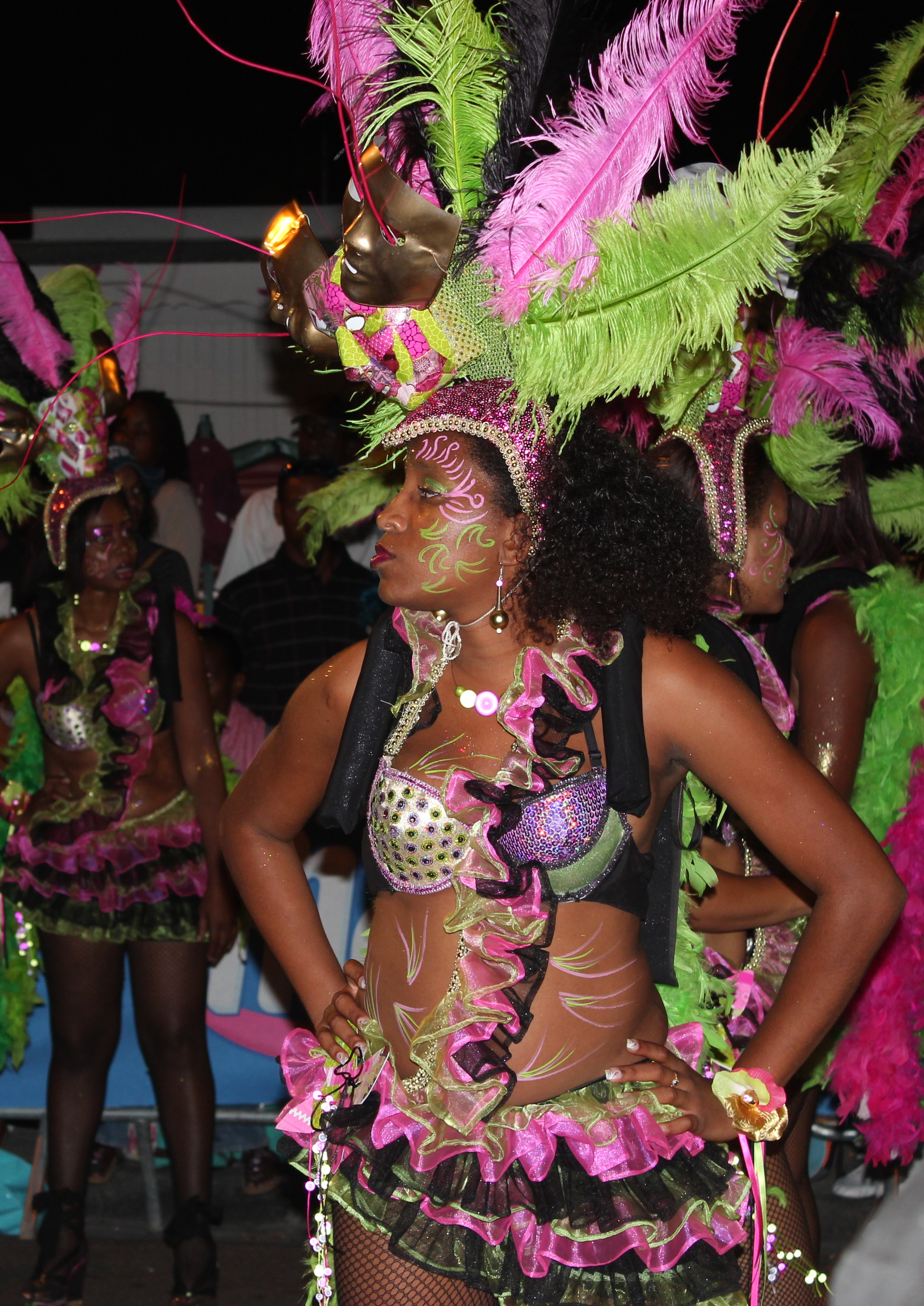
Carnival of Guadeloupe

Another element of Guadeloupean culture is its dress. A few women (particularly of the older generation) wear a unique style of traditional dress, with many layers of colourful fabric, now only worn on special occasions. On festive occasions they also wore a madras (originally a "kerchief" from South India) headscarf tied in many different symbolic ways, each with a different name. The headdress could be tied in the "bat" style, or the "firefighter" style, as well as the "Guadeloupean woman". Jewellery, mainly gold, is also important in the Guadeloupean lady's dress, a product of European, African and Indian inspiration.

=== Traditional dress ===
Traditional dress, inherited today, is the result of a long cultural mix involving Africa, Asia and Europe. This cultural mix was initially based on triangular trade and later on a more globalized trade that included importing fabrics from the Orient. trade that included importing fabrics from the Orient. For example, the traditional Guadeloupean costume has Asian influences through the use of madras cloth from India; African and Spanish influences through the use of the headscarf for covering; and French influences through the adoption of the lace petticoat from Brittany.

The clothing worn in Guadeloupe has mutated over the centuries and has undergone changes that reflect the social conditions and the evolution of society, from the time of slavery to the present day. During the second half of the 17th century, slaves arriving in Guadeloupe were naked or nearly naked. They were then forced to wear rags or the owner's worn-out clothes, which were quickly discarded, barely concealing their nakedness. Or slaves working in the fields wore the "three-hole" dress, made of a vegetable fiber fabric in which three holes were made (two for the arms and one for the head). Under pressure from the church and the authorities, slaves were forced to wear the "three-hole" dress.

Under pressure from the church and as soon as the Black Code was enforced in 1685, owners were required to provide "each slave with two suits of cloth or four alders [about 7.5 m^{2}; 81 sq ft] of cloth a year... art.25" which only modestly improved their conditions. However, the poor quality of the clothing worn during slavery must be qualified, as it could vary according to the day of the week (daily clothing, Sunday clothing, clothing for special occasions), or according to the status of the slaves employed in the houses.

In fact, the latter could be dressed in clothes of different quality according to the job they performed on the property. For example, in the case of the maids, their clothes could be of better quality because they had to reflect the image of success and wealth that their master wanted to project.

From the 17th century onwards, the development of the Creole costume coincided with the desire of slave women to regain their dignity, with the evolution of their employment within the household or Guadeloupean society (specialization in the sewing and dressmaking trades), with the evolution of Guadeloupean society (free women of colour, freed slaves, mulatto women) and with the influence of the European fashionable costume, which the housewife represented.

After the abolition of slavery, the main periods of traditional Guadeloupean dress were the following:

- 1848 to 1930, establishment of the use of the costume;
- From 1930 to 1950, significant decrease in the use of the traditional costume;
- From 1950 to 1960, period in which the traje becomes a "folkloric" garment;
- From 1960 to the present, the traditional costume has been recovered and is valued both as an everyday garment and as a sign of attachment to the culture of Guadalupe. Today, many designers are inspired by the traditional costume to make some of their creations.

As a result of this fusion of African and European dress codes over the centuries, including materials from distant origins, the Guadeloupean wardrobe includes Creole garments such as: the cozy dress or wòb ti-do, an everyday dress also called "à corps" because it fits the body like a corset; the skirt-shirt, in ceremonial dress (the shirt is made of very fine batiste trimmed with lace, which stops at the elbows and is buttoned with golden buttons. The skirt, full and very wide in the back with tail, is knotted above the breasts); the bodice dress which is distinguished from the others by the quantity and richness of the fabric used (satin, brocade satin, satin).

- The traditional headdress, worn with or without the women's traditional costume, is the subject of a precise codification:
- The "tête chaudière" is the ceremonial headdress with a round, flat shape, topped with a spiked knot;
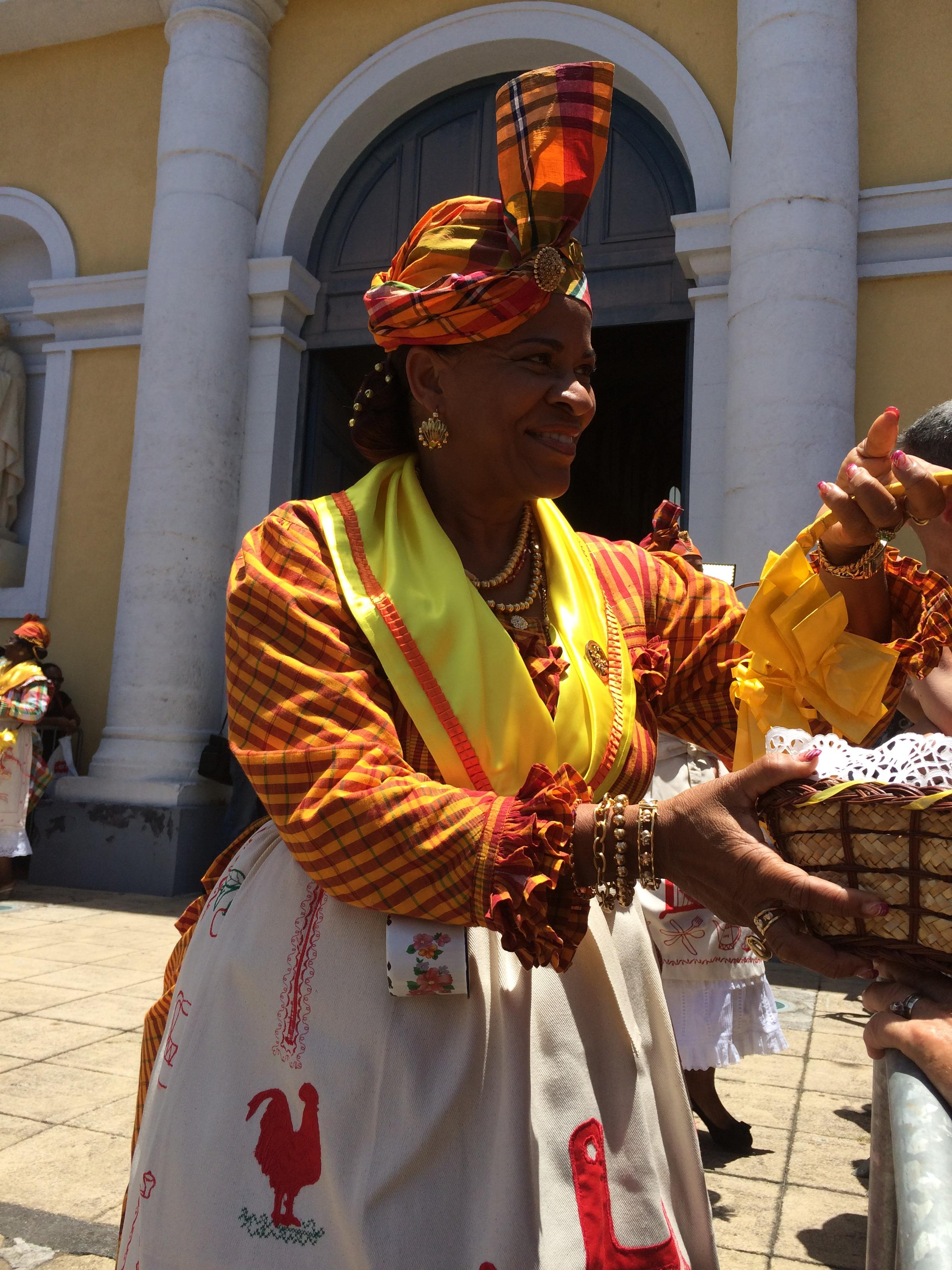
  La fête des cuisinières
- The four-pointed headdress (headdress with four knots) means "my heart has room for whoever wants it!";
- The three-pointed headdress means "my heart is taken!";
- The two-pointed headdress means "my heart is compromised, but you can try your luck!";
- The one-ended headdress means "my heart is free!"

=== Gastronomy ===
Guadeloupean cuisine is a mixture of African, European and Asian influences. It uses first of all agricultural products such as poyo (plantain more commonly called green plantain or ti-nain), bread plantain, okra, cabbage, pigeon peas, cristofine, yam or sweet potato.

The sea and rivers provide rays, snappers, octopus (chatou), lambis, burgots (a type of large whelk), sea urchins and ouassous. Orchards provide fruits such as soursop, red jambosier, passion fruit (marakoudja), mango, quenette, and citrus. Condiments sometimes added to dishes are habanero chili, cive (a kind of onion from the country) or roucou seeds that give a red tint to sauces.

The cooking, often spicy and seasoned, results from soaking meat or fish for hours before cooking, to enhance its flavour. Typical dishes are: fish blaff, dombrés, bébélé (from Marie-Galante), colombo (equivalent to Indian curry) and matété (rice cooked with crab). As for appetizers or snacks, there are morcillas criollas, accras, cassava cakes and bokit.

As for desserts, there are blancmange, sorbets or various fruit salads. Pastries include pâtés with jam, tournament d'amour (in Les Saintes), caca bœuf (in Marie-Galante) or sacristain. Pain natté, a local brioche bread, is often eaten.

There are local productions of candied fruits (elderberry, pineapple, carambola) and jams (guava, banana, coconut). Sorbets such as coconut sherbet or snowball made with crushed ice to which a syrup (mint, grenadine) is added are also consumed. Sweets include coconut sugar, kilibibi and konkada (of Beninese origin).

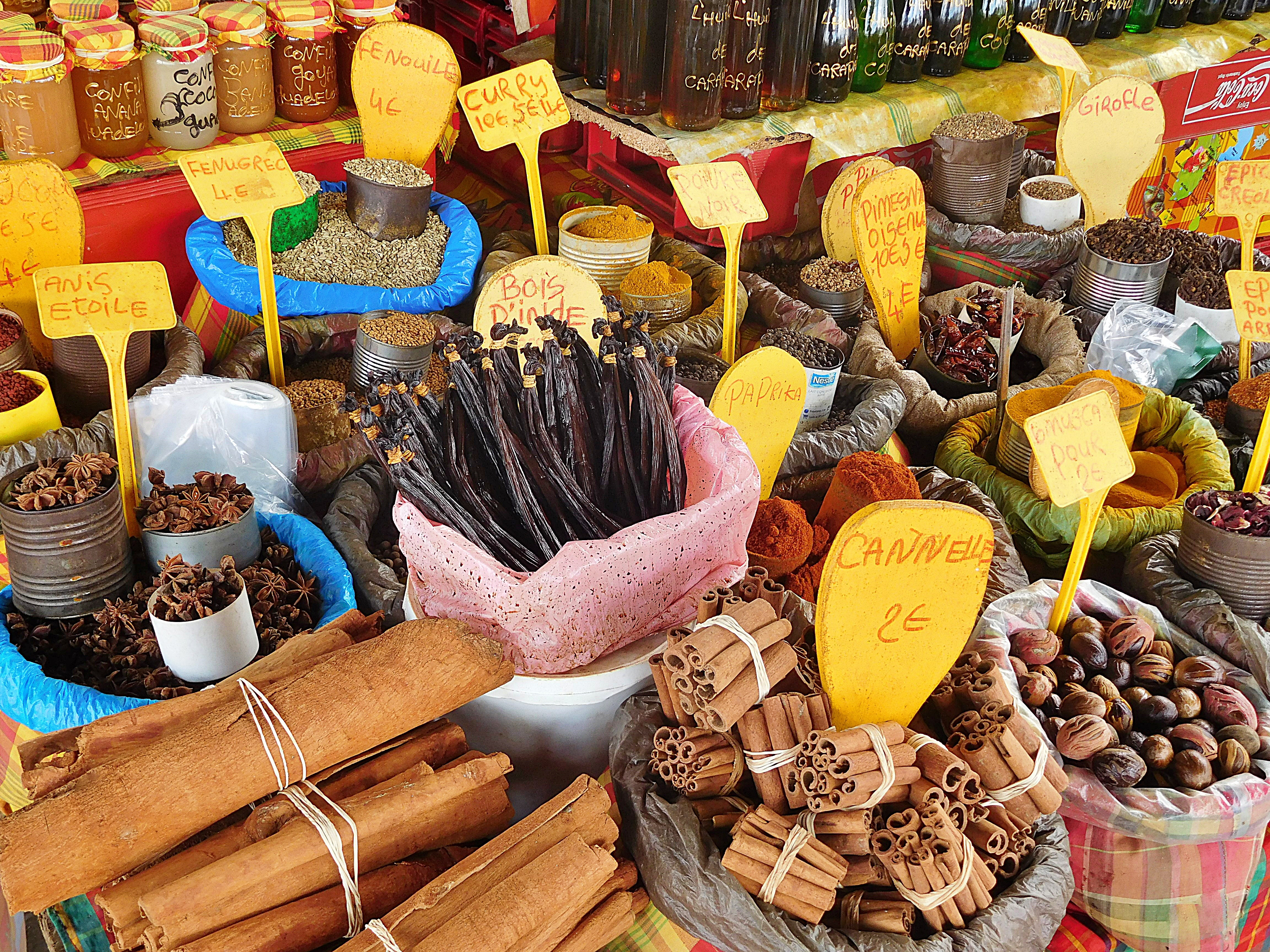
Darse Market, Pointe-à-Pitre

In the category of beverages, the consumption of soft drinks is very important in Guadeloupe, as well as that of a drink locally nicknamed black beer. In addition, it is not uncommon to see vendors of sugar cane juice or coconut water on the roads. Chaudeau is consumed on special occasions (weddings, baptisms, communions) and is a Guadeloupean-style eggnog eaten with a whipped cake (génoise). The rum, whose consumption is culturally imbricated in the Guadeloupean society, comes in particular from one of the ten distilleries distributed in the Guadeloupean territory and that produce the rums of Guadeloupe.

=== Festivities ===
At Christmas, families and friends gather during the chanté Nwel, an opportunity to sing carols and celebrate. After the vacations, rehearsals begin for the Guadeloupe carnival. Carnival groups parade through the streets every Sunday afternoon until the Carnival festivities in February or March. For example, the groups with skins, the Akiyo group are groups composed only of large percussion and lambi shell instruments. They have the particularity of having no brass instruments in the band, no choreography, they often parade without themed costumes. Since 2014, the Carnival in kabwèt of Marie-Galante has been registered in the inventory of the intangible heritage of France at UNESCO.

Shrove Tuesday is a festival during which carnival groups compete to win in categories such as best costumes, best music, or best choreography with a theme chosen by the carnival committees. The festival occurs in the main town, Basse-Terre, or in Pointe-à-Pitre. The next day, Ash Wednesday, marks the end of the carnival. At this time, the mascot king of the carnival nicknamed Vaval is burned, which signals the end of the festivities. This is followed by parades where participants wear black and white (to mark Vaval's mourning). Most of the population is Catholic and respects the Lenten period that follows. However, given the great fondness for festivities, a "Thursday of Lent" parade is organized in red and black identical to that of Carnival, with groups of musicians preceded by people parading.

After this period of deprivation, the Easter celebrations take place, during which families usually go camping on the beach and eat traditional and very popular dishes based on crabs: matété (rice cooked with crab), calalou (crabs with wooden leaves accompanied by white rice) or dombrés with crabs (small balls of flour cooked with crab).

== Sport ==
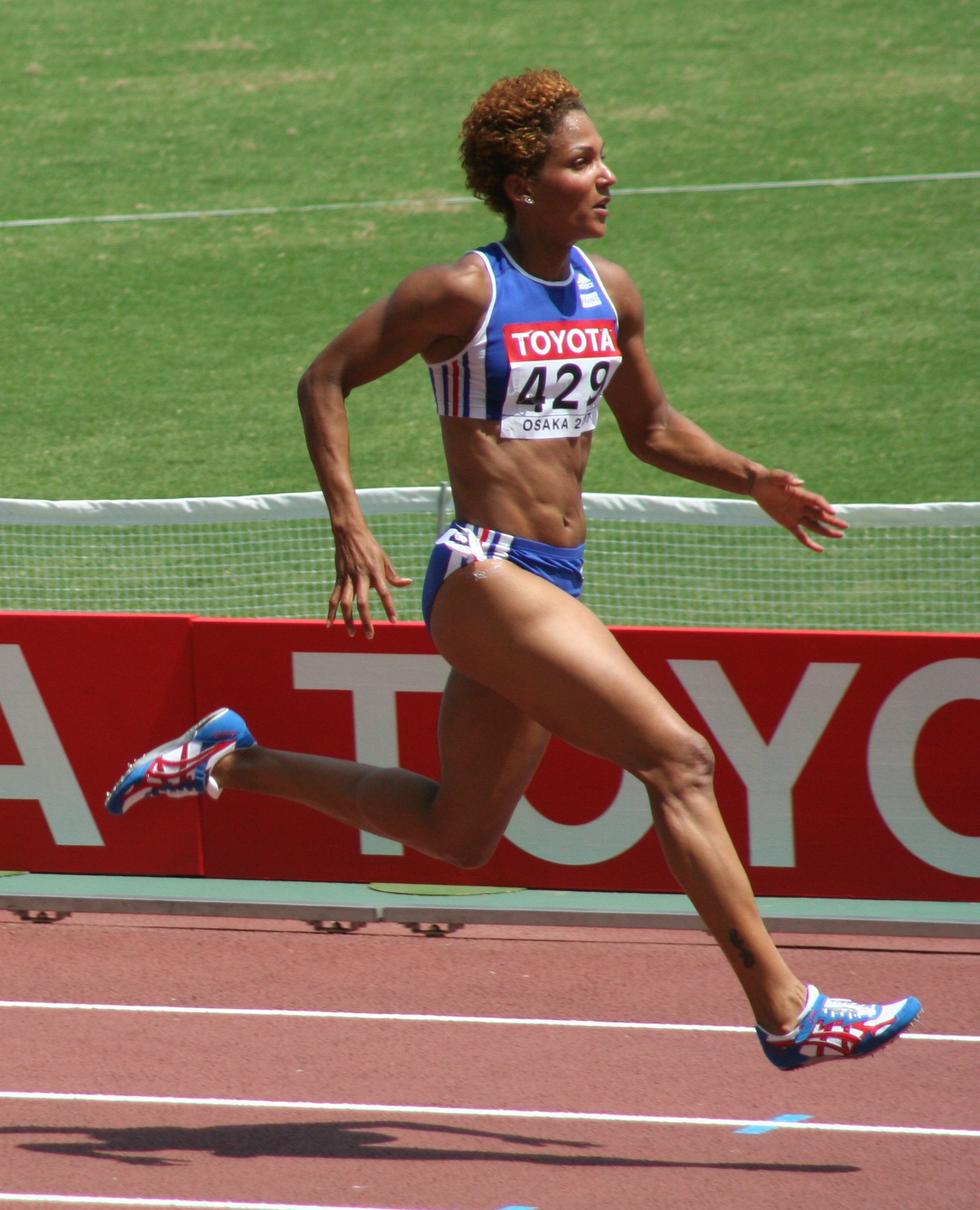
Christine Arron, one of the world's fastest female 100-metre runners (10.73 sec in 1998)

The country has a passion for cycling. Since 1948 it has hosted the Tour de Guadeloupe. In 2013, 2015 to 2020 and since 2022, the tour has been on the UCI Europe Tour calendar. It hosted the French Track Cycling Championships in 2009. The Vélodrome Amédée Détraux is the largest velodrome in the Antilles. It has a capacity for 9000 spectators.

Football is the second most popular sport in Guadeloupe behind cycling, and several notable footballers were born in Guadeloupe, including Marius Trésor, Lilian Thuram, David Sommeil, Jocelyn Angloma, Thomas Lemar, Ronald Zubar and his younger brother Stéphane, Claudio Beauvue, Miguel Comminges, Bernard Lambourde, when others are of Guadeloupean origin like, Dimitri Foulquier, Anthony Martial, Alexandre Lacazette, Thierry Henry, William Gallas, Mikael Silvestre, Mathys Tel, Kingsley Coman.

The Guadeloupe football team were 2007 CONCACAF Gold Cup semi-finalists for its first appearance in the tournament, defeated by Mexico.

Basketball is the fourth popular sport on the island. Best known players from Guadeloupe are, former NBA players Mickaël Piétrus and his brother Florent Piétrus, Rodrigue Beaubois, and Mickael Gelabale. When the NBA players Rudy Gobert and Johan Petro are of Guadeloupean heritage from their roots.

The twelve-time world judo champion & three-time Gold Olympic medalist Teddy Riner is one of the famous known athletes who was born on the island. He is also a five-time European champion, a four-time World Masters gold medalist, and an eleven-time Grand Slam winner.

Several track and field athletes, such as Marie-José Pérec, Patricia Girard-Léno, Christine Arron, and Wilhem Belocian, are also Guadeloupe natives.

Several internationally successful fencers were born and raised in Guadeloupe, including Yannick Borel, Daniel Jérent, Ysaora Thibus, Anita Blaze and Laura Flessel. Borel has attributed the island’s success in the sport to its fencing schools and local fencing culture.

Even though Guadeloupe is part of France, it has its own sports teams. Rugby union is a small but rapidly growing sport in Guadeloupe.

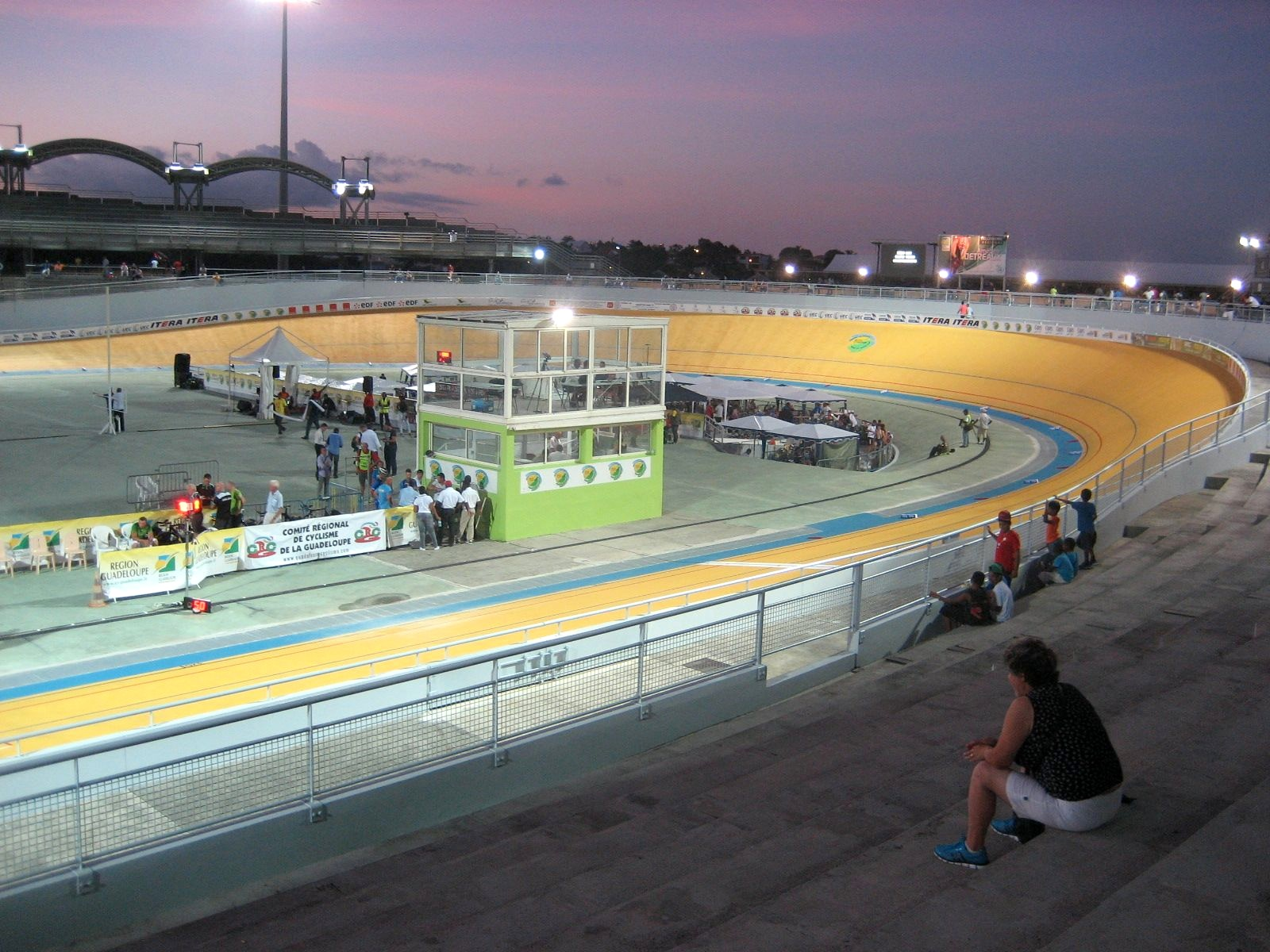
Vélodrome Amédée Détraux

The island was also internationally known for hosting the Karujet Race – Jet Ski World Championship since 1998. This nine-stage, four-day event attracts competitors from around the world (mostly Caribbeans, Americans, and Europeans). The Karujet, generally made up of seven races around the island, has an established reputation as one of the most difficult championships in which to compete. After 20 years of holding the event, in 2019, due to ecological issues, the organization had to stop holding it.

The island receives every four years the Route du Rhum is one of the most prominent nautical French sporting events.

Bodybuilder Serge Nubret was born in Anse-Bertrand, Grande-Terre, representing the French state in various bodybuilding competitions throughout the 1960s and 1970s including the IFBB's Mr. Olympia contest, taking 3rd place every year from 1972 to 1974, and 2nd place in 1975. Bodybuilder Marie-Laure Mahabir also hails from Guadeloupe.

Tennisman Gaël Monfils is Guadeloupean heritage from his father. The island had hosted the Orange Open de Guadeloupe tennis tournament 2011-2016, 2018. The event was part of the ATP Challenger Tour and was played on clay courts. And since 2014, the International Women’s Tennis Tournament has been held, is part of the ITF Women’s World Tennis Tour (W35 category).

The Tour de Voile Traditionel (Tour of Guadeloupe sailing), best known as the TGVT is held every year in july, which was founded in 1981.

In Boxing, Ludovic Proto – as an amateur, he competed in the 1988 Summer Olympics in the men's light welterweight division. As a professional, he was a former French and European welterweight champion;

Gilbert Delé – as a professional, he was a former French and European light-middleweight champion, then he won the WBA world light-middleweight title in 1991;

Jean-Marc Mormeck – as a professional, he was a former French light heavyweight champion and two-time unified world cruiserweight champion—held the WBA, WBC, and The Ring titles twice between 2005 and 2007.

== Transport ==
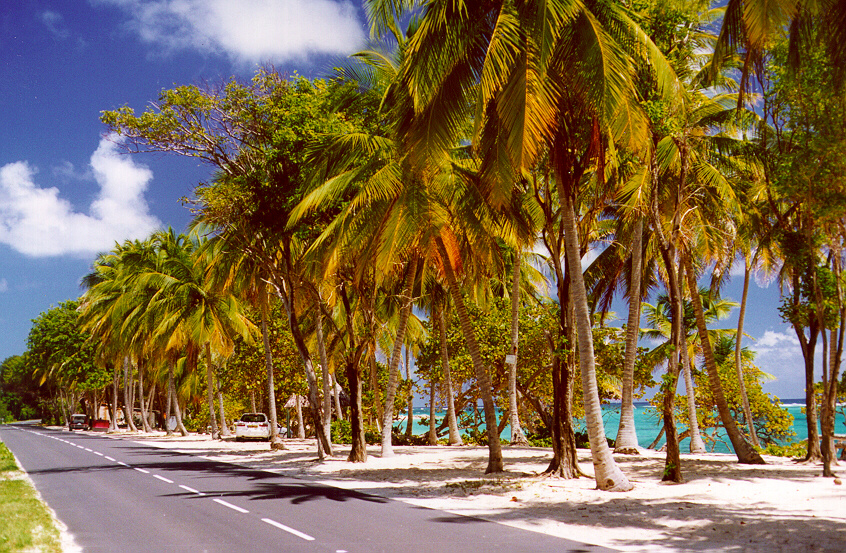
A road on Marie-Galante

Guadeloupe is served by a number of airports; most international flights use Pointe-à-Pitre International Airport. Boats and cruise ships frequent the islands, using the ports at Pointe-à-Pitre and Basse-Terre.

On 9 September 2013 the county government voted in favour of constructing a tramway in Pointe-à-Pitre. The first phase will link northern Abymes to downtown Pointe-à-Pitre by 2019. The second phase, scheduled for completion in 2023, will extend the line to serve the university.

== Education ==
The Guadeloupe academic region includes only the Guadeloupe academy. It employs 9,618 people and its operating budget was €714.3 million for 2018–2019. The territory has 300 elementary schools, including 1 private kindergarten under contract and 14 private elementary schools under contract. It also has 52 middle schools, including 6 private under contract. And finally, it has 38 high schools, 13 of which are private under contract.

During the 2018–2019 school year were enrolled at Guadeloupe Academy:

- 45,510 students in primary education;
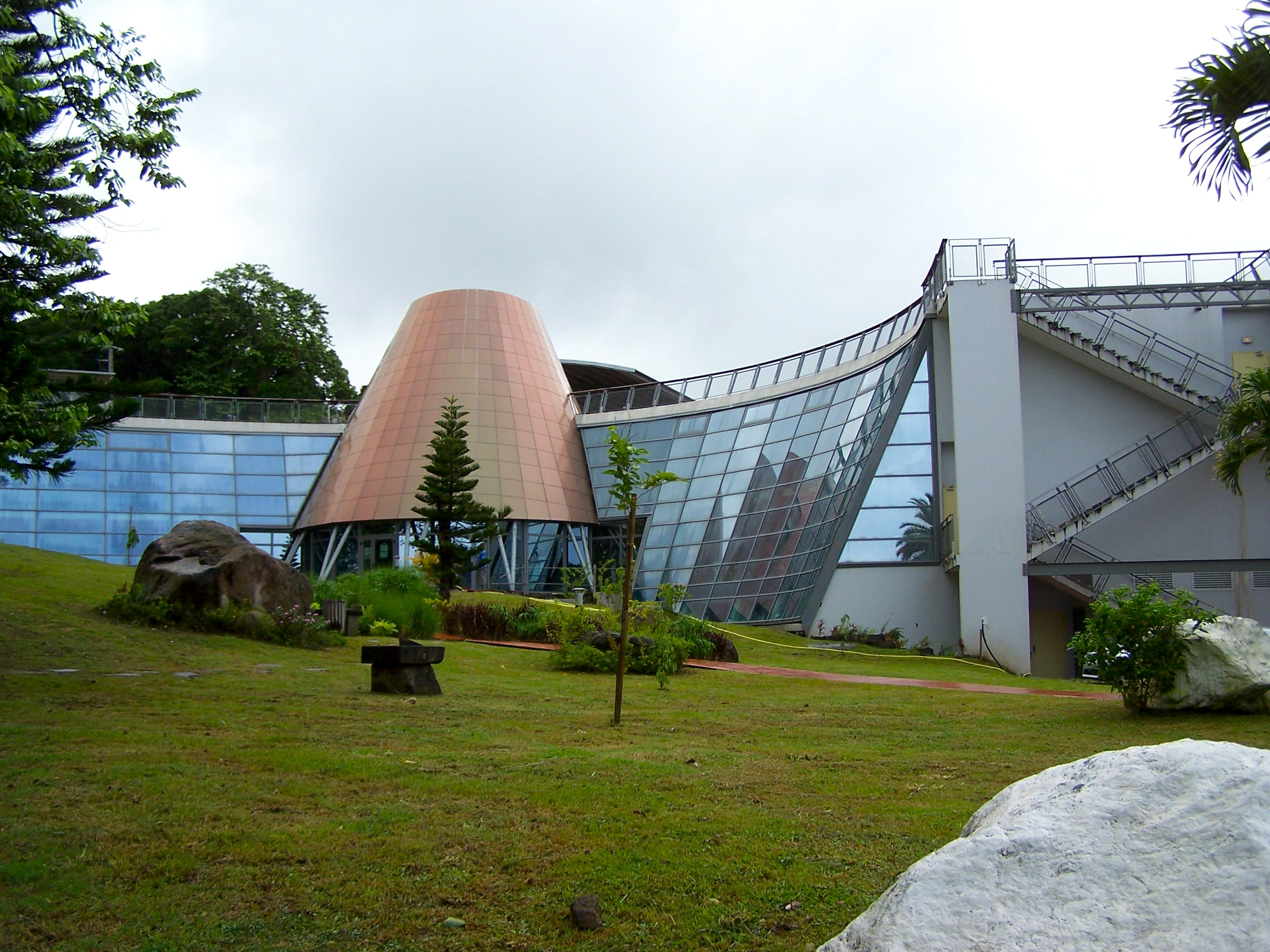
- View of the University of the West Indies and Guiana, Saint-Claude, Guadeloupe
  45,626 students in secondary education;
- 2,718 graduate students in high school.
- Since 2014, the academy has 12 districts divided into 5 poles:
- The Pôle Îles du Nord (St. Martin and St. Barthélemy);
- The Basse-Terre Nord Pole (Baie-Mahault, Capesterre-Belle-Eau and Sainte-Rose);
- The South Pole of Basse-Terre: Basse-Terre and Bouillante (including the islands of Les Saintes);
- The North Pole of Grande-Terre: Grande-Terre Nord, Sainte-Anne and Saint-François (including the islands of La Désirade and Marie-Galante);
- The South Pole of Grande-Terre: Les Abymes, Gosier and Pointe-à-Pitre.

The islands of Guadeloupe are also home to two campuses of the University of the French Antilles, Camp-Jacob in Saint-Claude and Fouillole in Pointe-à-Pitre, the latter being the headquarters of the institution. Student residences are located around each campus. Furthermore, a satellite campus dedicated to healthcare is located in the vicinity of the University Hospital Centre of Pointe-à-Pitre, many schools for apprentices are located throughout the archipelago, an Arts and Crafts Centre acting as local school for fine art is located in Bergevin, Pointe-à-Pitre, and, finally, three sites of the regional second chance school are implanted in various high schools.

== Infrastructure ==
=== Energy ===
The island has great potential for solar, wind and marine energy, but by 2018, biomass and coal energy and petroleum hydrocarbons are still the most used.

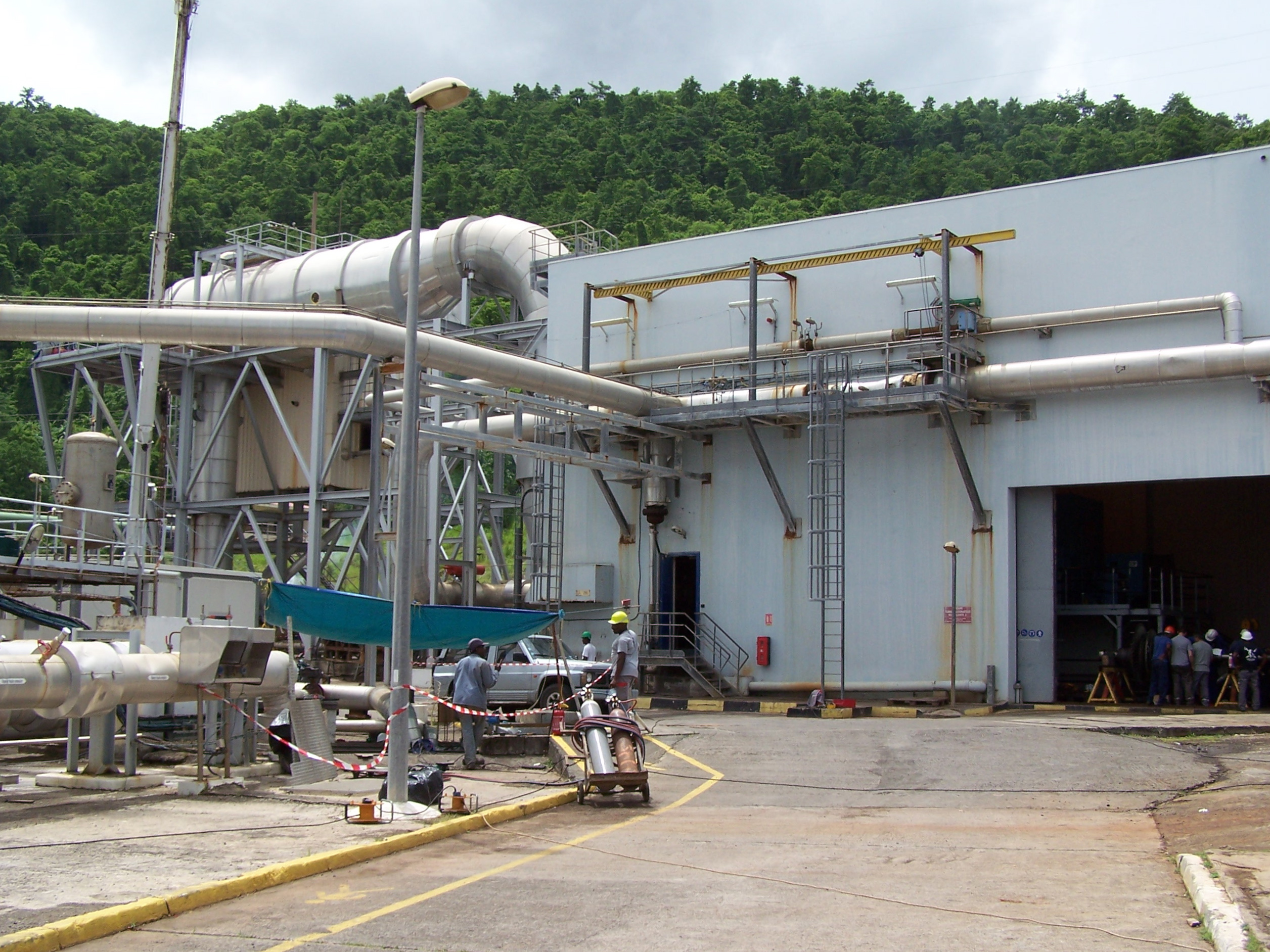
Bouillante geothermal power plant, Guadeloupe

The Energy transition Law (TECV) provides for 50% renewable energy by 2020 in the territory. And the Guadeloupe EPP plans to develop 66 MW of additional biomass capacity between 2018 and 2023, including 43 MW to replace coal.

For example, the Albioma Caraïbes (AC) coal-fired power plant will be converted to biomass to help increase the share of renewables in Guadeloupe's energy mix from 20.5% to 35%, thereby mitigating the island's dependence on fossil fuels and reducing acidic air pollution and the production of toxic and bottom ash.

This 34 MW power plant, producing 260 GWh/year of electricity in 2018 (i.e. 15% of the island's needs), should reduce 265 000 t of CO_{2} equivalent/year throughout the chain (−87% once converted to biomass compared to the previous situation, coal).

Guadeloupe has an electricity production plant, in Le Moule, based on the sugar cane agricultural sector, which recovers the residues from sugar cane crushing (bagasse) to produce energy; 12 wind farms, such as in Désirade, Le Moule or Marie-Galante; a geothermal power plant in Bouillante, which uses the energy of water vapor produced by volcanic activity (the plant's electricity production ranks it first nationally); a project to harness the energy of waves and ocean currents; photovoltaic installations that contribute to the operation of solar water heaters for homes and to the development of the electric vehicle sector.

Electricity produced by hydropower, which represents 2.2% of total production, comes from dams built on the beds of certain rivers.

=== Drinking water supply ===
The water distributed by Guadeloupe's drinking water network comes mainly from Basse Terre, 70% from river intakes and 20% from spring catchments. The remaining 10% comes from boreholes tapping the groundwater of Grande Terre and Marie-Galante.

Access to water and sanitation is problematic due to the deteriorated state of the network, which causes many losses in the water supply system. For years, water shortages have been recurrent and have forced "water shifts", mainly in the municipalities of Grande-Terre, which are the most affected, with consequences for private individuals and agricultural activities.

According to statistics from the Water Office (2020 data), 61% of drinking water production is wasted, i.e., almost 50 million cubic metres (65 million cu. yd.) of water per year, due to pipes in poor condition. In addition, 70% of wastewater treatment plants do not meet standards.

== Police and crime ==
Guadeloupe is the most violent overseas French department in 2025. The murder rate is significantly higher than that of Paris, at 13.68 per 100,000. The high level of unemployment caused violence and crime to rise, especially in 2009 and 2010, the years following the Great Recession. Residents of Guadeloupe describe the island as a place with little everyday crime, and most violence is caused by the drug trade or domestic disputes. In 2021, additional police officers were deployed to the island in the face of rioting arising out of COVID-19 restrictions.

Normally, about 2,000 police officers are present on the island including some 760 active National Gendarmerie of the COMGEND (Gendarmerie Command of Guadeloupe) region plus around 260 reservists. The active Gendarmerie include three Mobile Gendarmerie Squadrons (EGM) and a Republican Guard Intervention Platoon (PIGR). The Maritime Gendarmerie deploys the patrol boat Violette in the territory, which is planned for replacement by a new PCG-NG patrol boat in the latter 2020s.

== See also ==
- Bibliography of Guadeloupe
- Index of Guadeloupe-related articles
- List of colonial and departmental heads of Guadeloupe
- Dependencies of Guadeloupe
- Overseas departments and territories of France
- Slavery in the Caribbean
