= Arab Guadeloupeans =

Arab people in Guadeloupe island

اللبنانيون في جزيرة غوادلوب

Total population
- 9,000

Regions with significant populations
- Mainly urban areas: Pointe-à-Pitre, Basse-Terre and Terre-de-Haut.

Languages
- French, Arabic, Antillean Creole.

Religion
- Christianity mainly Maronite Church

Related ethnic groups
- Lebanese; other Arabs; Syrians

Arab Guadeloupeans (French: Guadeloupéens Arabe; Arabic: الجوادلوبيون اللبنانيون) are Guadeloupean citizens of Arab origin or descent. Guadeloupeans Arabs are mainly from Lebanon and Syria. Guadeloupe has the largest Lebanese and Syrian population in French Antilles.

== History ==
From the 1870s onwards, a new wave of emigration joined the various groups of people who made up the population of the French Antilles and French Guiana. This migration originated in the Near East and was a direct consequence of religious conflicts, the policies of the Turkish authorities, and difficulties related to the economy and population growth.

== Economics ==
The Lebanese community has been able to integrate since its arrival. It has a notable impact on the Guadeloupean economy. In a century and a half, its men and women have written a new history after fleeing Ottoman persecution and economic problems.

== See also ==
- Lebanese diaspora
- Demographics of Guadeloupe
