= LKP =

LKP may refer to:

- Communist Party of Latvia, (Latvian Latvijas Komunistiskā partija), a former political party in Latvia
- Communist Party of Lithuania, (Lithuanian: Lietuvos komunistų partija), a former political party in Lithuania
- Lakshadweep, a union territory of India (postal code LKP)
- Lahaina, Kaanapali and Pacific Railroad, Hawaii, USA, reporting mark LK&P
- Lake Placid Airport, New York, USA, IATA code
- Liyannaj Kont Pwofitasyon, Guadeloupe trade union groups
- RNA Helicase A, a human enzyme
- Liberty Korea Party, a political party of South Korea
