= Basse-Terre =

Commune and prefecture of Guadeloupe

Basse-Terre Bastè (Guadeloupean Creole French)
- Prefecture and commune
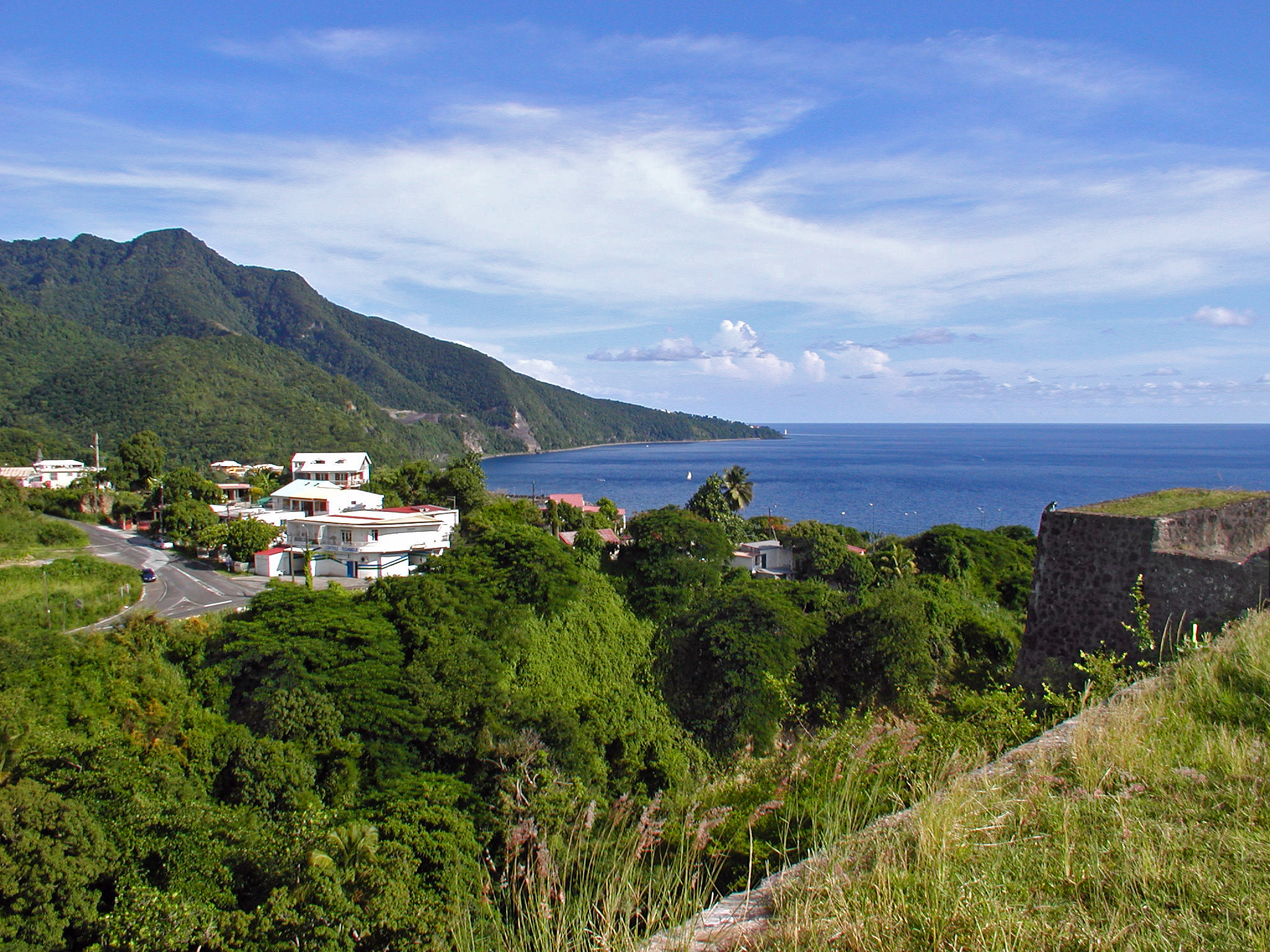
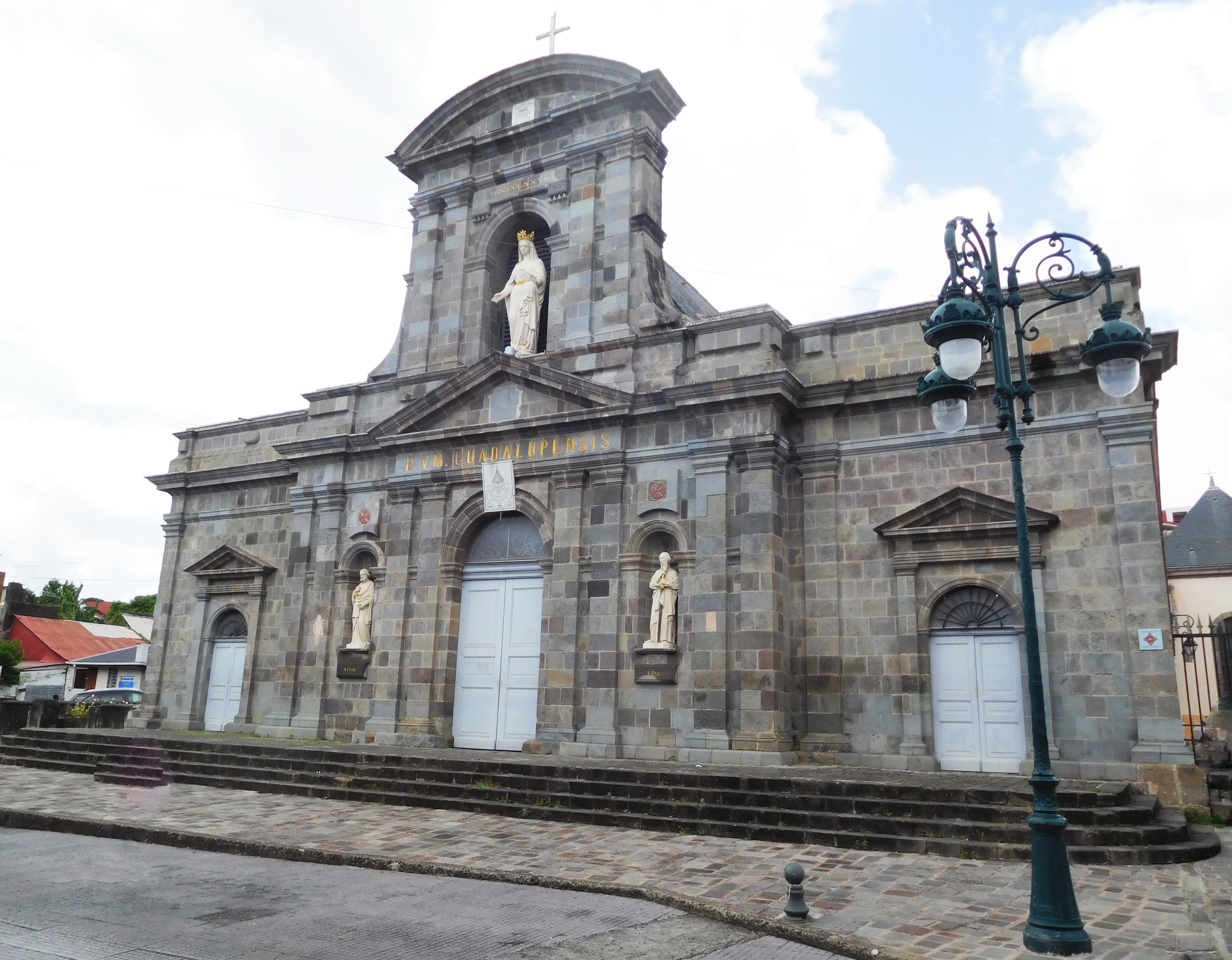
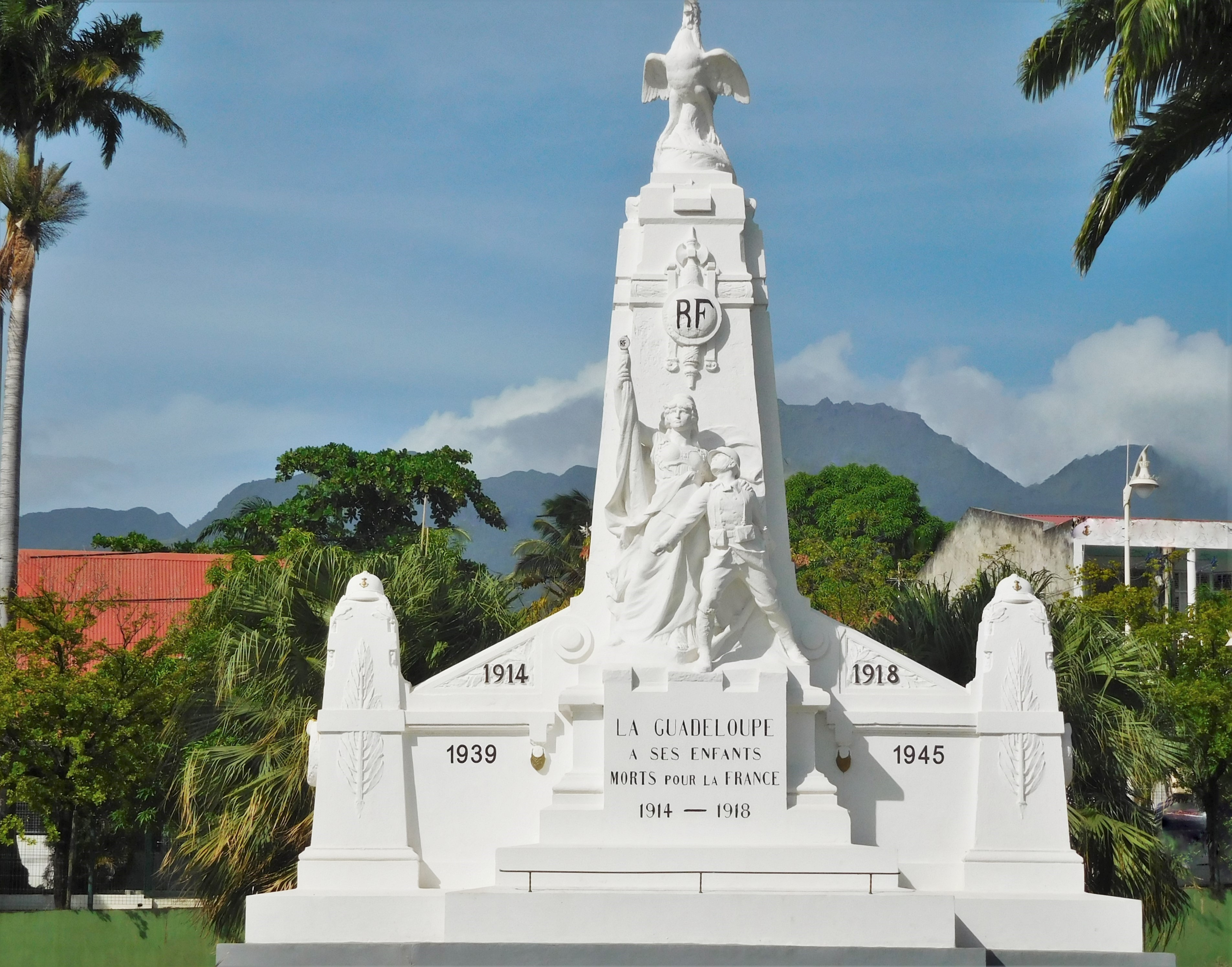
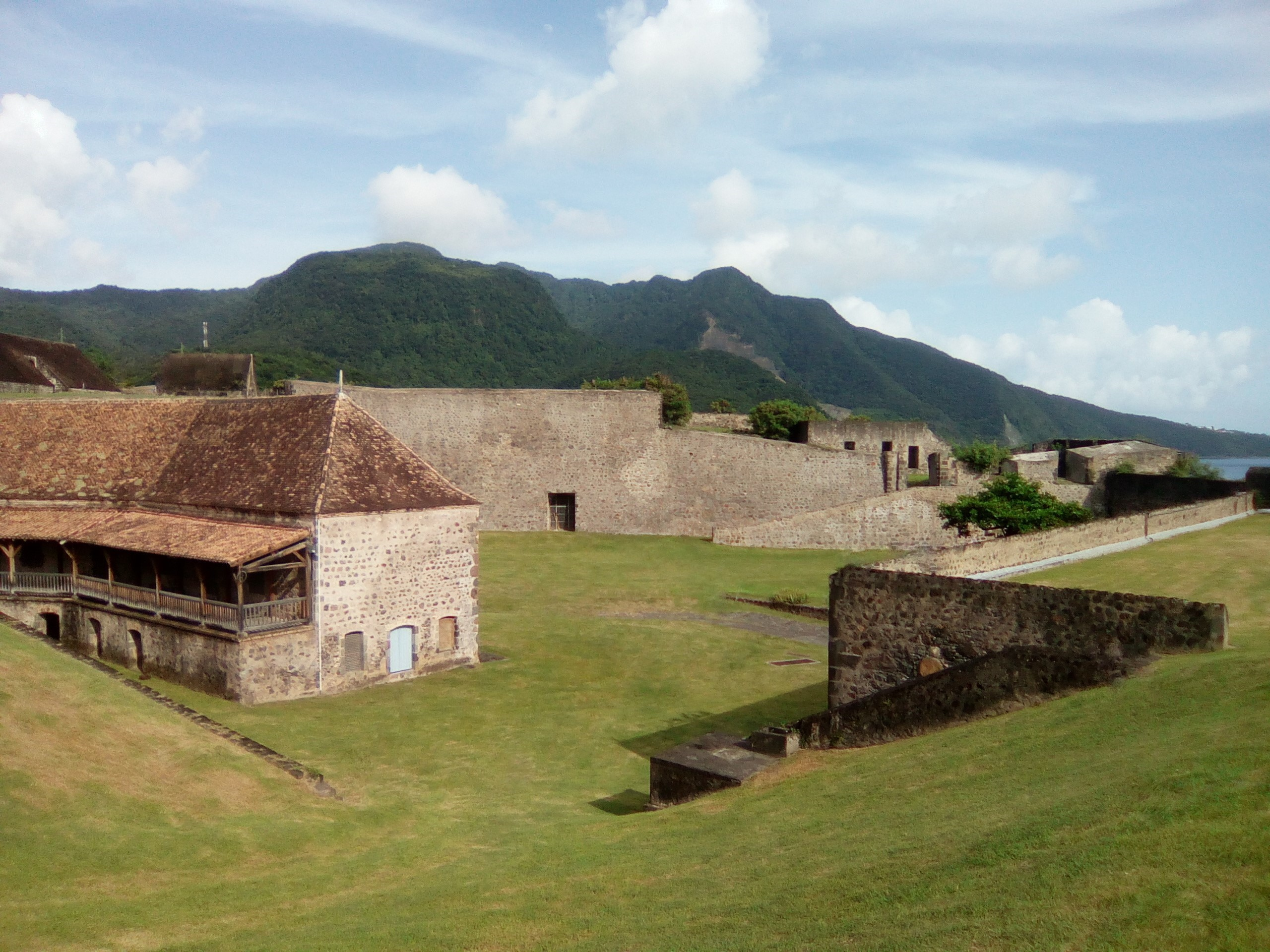
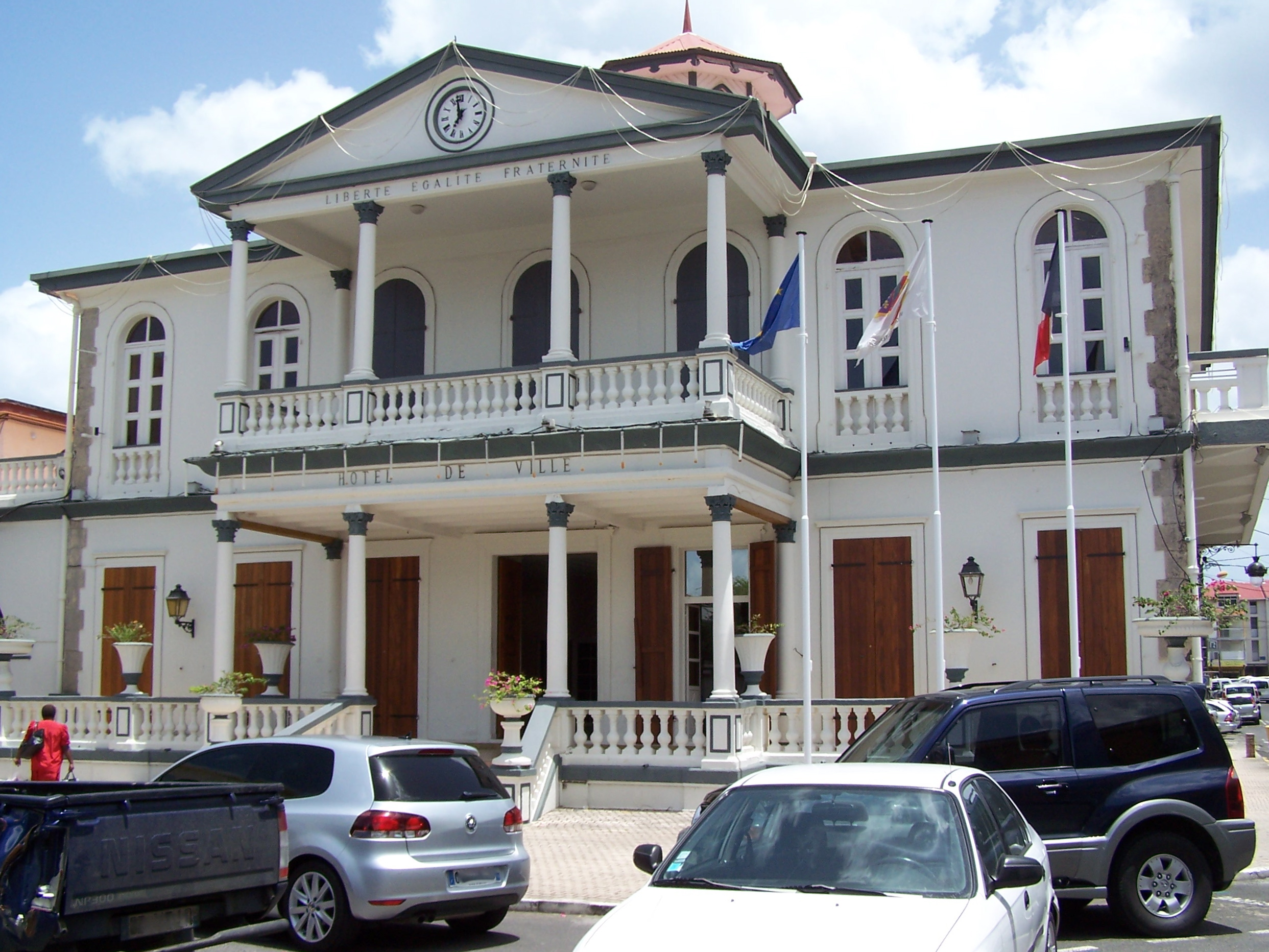
- Top: View from Fort Louis Delgrès in Basse-Terre; Middle: Cathedral of Our Lady of Guadaleoupe, Monument to the dead of Basse-Terre; Bottom: Fort Delgrès, Basse-Terre Town Hall

- Coat of arms

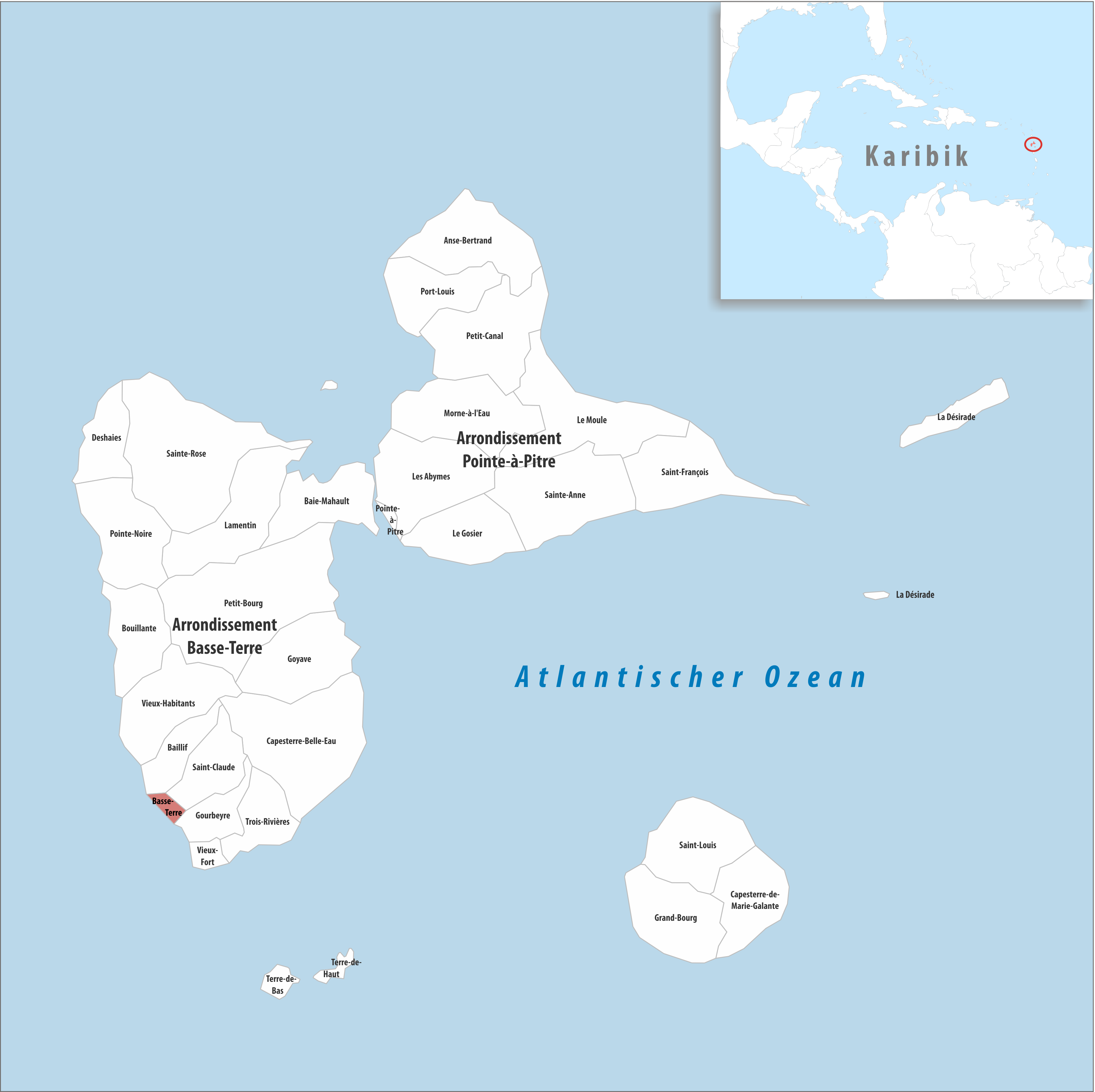
- Location of the commune (in red) within Guadeloupe
- Location of Basse-Terre
- Location within France
- Coordinates: 15°59′45″N 61°43′45″W
- Country: France
- Overseas region and department: Guadeloupe
- Arrondissement: Basse-Terre
- Canton: Basse-Terre
- Intercommunality: CA Grand Sud Caraïbe

Government
  - Mayor (2020–2026): André Atallah
- Area^{1}: 5.78 km^{2} (2.23 sq mi)
- Population (2023): 9,417
  - Density: 1,630/km^{2} (4,220/sq mi)
- Time zone: UTC−04:00 (AST)
- INSEE/Postal code: 97105 /97100
- ^{1} French Land Register data, which excludes lakes, ponds, glaciers > 1 km^{2} (0.386 sq mi or 247 acres) and river estuaries.

Basse-Terre (/bæsˈtɛər/, bas-TAIR; French: [bɑstɛʁ]; Guadeloupean Creole: Bastè [bastɛ]) is a commune in the French overseas department of Guadeloupe, in the Lesser Antilles. It is also the prefecture (capital city) of Guadeloupe. The city of Basse-Terre is located on Basse-Terre Island, the western half of Guadeloupe.

Although it is the administrative capital, Basse-Terre is only the second-largest city in Guadeloupe, behind Pointe-à-Pitre. Together with its urban area, it had 48,467 inhabitants in 2022, 9,419 of whom lived in the city of Basse-Terre proper.

== Geography ==
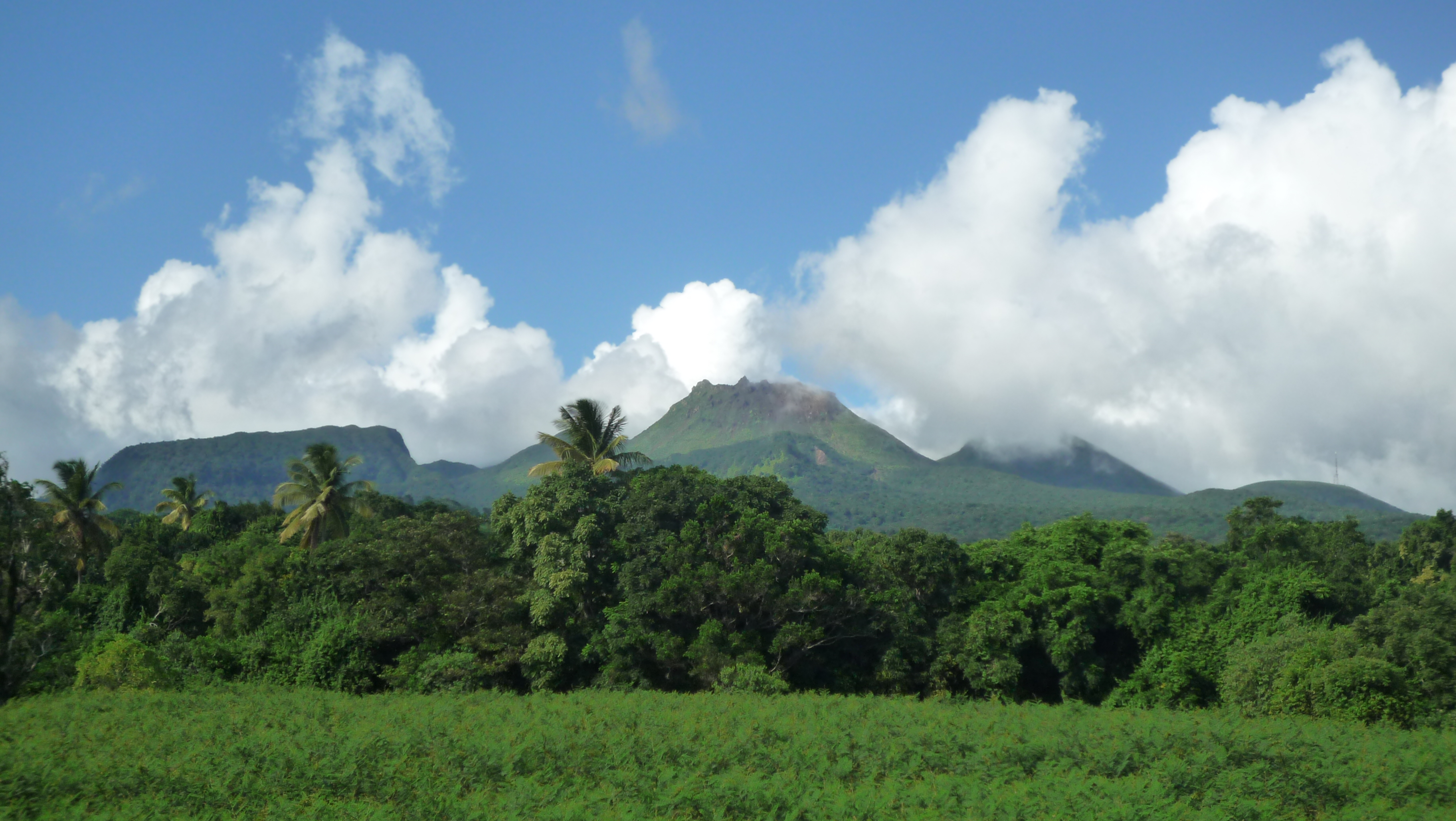
The Soufrière volcano

Basse-Terre is located in the south-western corner of the Basse-Terre portion of the island of Guadeloupe which is itself located some 100 km north of Dominica and some 450 km south-east of Puerto Rico. The commune is at the foot of the Soufrière volcano and is connected to the rest of the island by three main roads:

- The N1 which exits the commune in the south on the coast and continues inland to Gourbeyre then all the way around the coast to Pointe-à-Pitre on Grande-Terre.
- The N2 which goes north along the coast to Vieux Habitants and continues all the way around the coast to join the N1 at Baie Mahault.
- The N3 which traverses the length of the commune and continues to Saint-Claude inland.

Basse-Terre has a maritime station that receives cruise ships and has a ferry service to the Îles des Saintes.

The commune is mostly urban with some farmland in the north-east and north-west.

The different districts of Basse-Terre are: Agincourt (also Saint-Claude), Bas-du-Bourg, Carmel, Desmarais (also Saint-Claude) Guillaud, Morne-Chaulet, Morne-à-Vaches (also Saint-Claude), Petit-Paris, Pintade, Rivière-des-Peres, La Rue-Maillan, Saint-François, Sur-le Morne, and Versailles.

== Climate ==
Basse-Terre lies at a transitional point between a tropical rainforest climate and a tropical monsoon climate. As is the norm with cities with these two climate types, Basse-Terre features relatively consistent temperatures throughout the year.

Climate data for Basse-Terre
Month	Jan	Feb	Mar	Apr	May	Jun	Jul	Aug	Sep	Oct	Nov	Dec	Year
Record high °C (°F)	31 (88)	32 (90)	31 (88)	32 (90)	33 (91)	33 (91)	37 (99)	38 (100)	33 (91)	33 (91)	32 (90)	32 (90)	38 (100)
Mean daily maximum °C (°F)	28 (82)	28 (82)	28 (82)	29 (84)	30 (86)	31 (88)	31 (88)	31 (88)	31 (88)	30 (86)	29 (84)	28 (82)	30 (86)
Daily mean °C (°F)	24 (75)	24 (75)	25 (77)	26 (79)	27 (81)	27 (81)	27 (81)	27 (81)	27 (81)	27 (81)	26 (79)	25 (77)	26 (79)
Mean daily minimum °C (°F)	20 (68)	20 (68)	21 (70)	22 (72)	23 (73)	24 (75)	24 (75)	23 (73)	23 (73)	23 (73)	22 (72)	21 (70)	22 (72)
Record low °C (°F)	15 (59)	16 (61)	15 (59)	16 (61)	17 (63)	20 (68)	20 (68)	20 (68)	18 (64)	20 (68)	17 (63)	15 (59)	15 (59)
Average precipitation mm (inches)	80 (3.1)	60 (2.4)	70 (2.8)	110 (4.3)	150 (5.9)	120 (4.7)	160 (6.3)	190 (7.5)	230 (9.1)	220 (8.7)	220 (8.7)	140 (5.5)	1,750 (69)
Source: Weatherbase

== Toponymy ==
The name comes from the mariners' vocabulary of the 17th century which designated a land or coast sheltered from the wind, as opposed to Capesterre "Cape to the east of Land".

== History ==
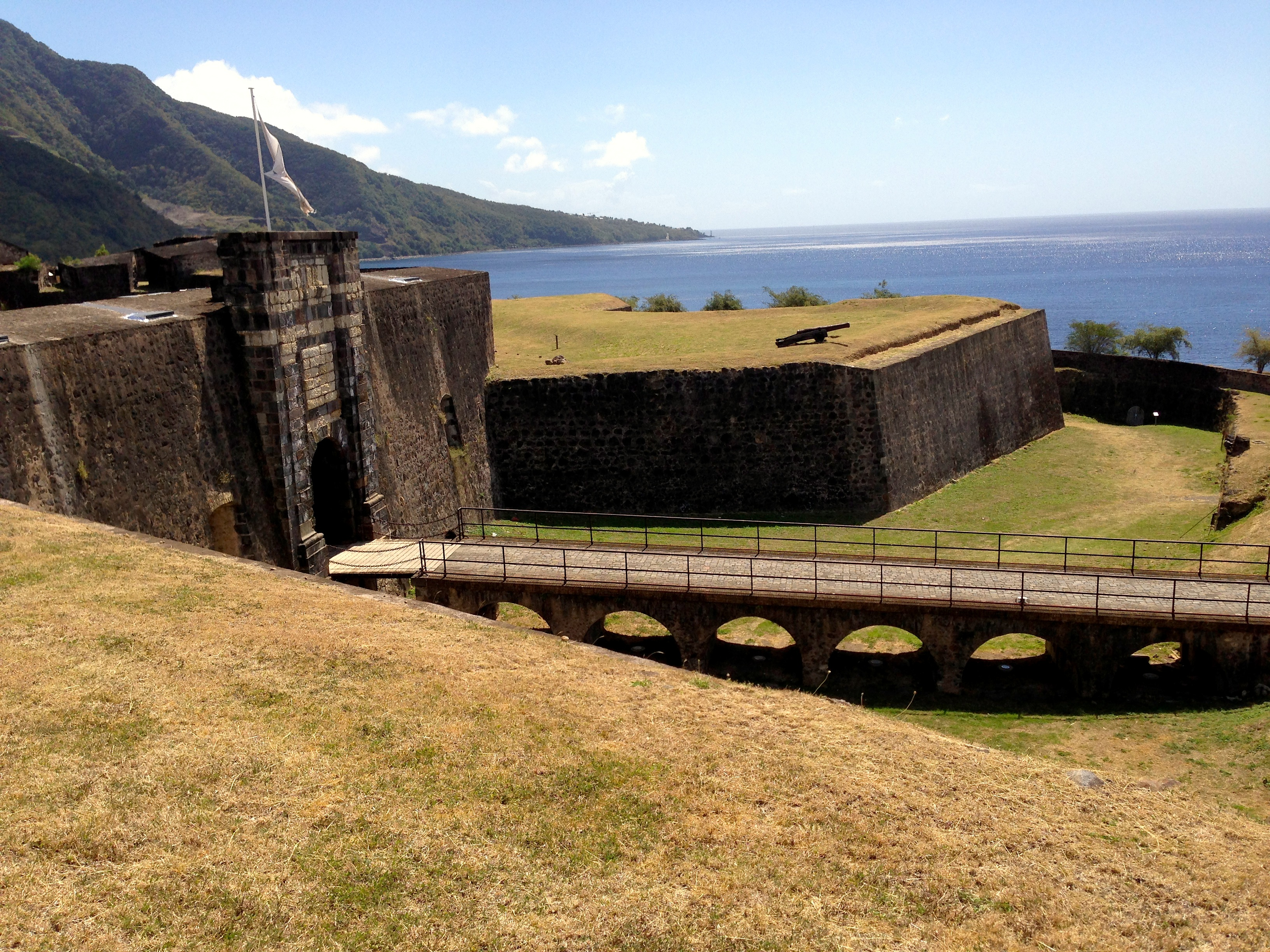
Fort Delgrès

=== Native American origins ===
Before Basse-Terre became a French town it was a village of American Indian horticulturists and potters. The village was on the site of the present Basse-Terre Cathedral where archaeological excavations found human remains and other evidence of occupation during the restoration of the cathedral.

In 2005 on the lower part of a Native American garbage dump, excavations have uncovered a new dump containing large amounts of archaeological material: food waste, ceramics, stone tools and shell tools, ornaments, charcoal and a tomb.

=== Birth of the town of Basse-Terre (1635–1649) ===
In 1635, when it was part of Saint Kitts and Nevis, an expedition was seeking a place of lasting presence in Guadeloupe. The operation was entrusted to Charles Liénard de l'Olive and Jean du Plessis d'Ossonville together with 4 missionaries and 550 colonists. The landing took place on 28 June 1635, at Pointe Allègre, far from Basse-Terre. Famine pushed the party to the south near the present town of Vieux-Fort in early 1636. The relationship between Native Americans and colonists degraded quickly; Liénard then began a bloody war against the locals. In 1660 a treaty forced him to retreat to Dominica and Saint Vincent. The war forced him to build a fort, today Fort Olive at Vieux Fort. In 1640 Jean Aubert succeeded Liénard as the government of the island and he soon left the site to settle on the left bank of the Galion, which is the current Gourbeyre marina. In 1643 Charles Houël du Petit Pré replaced Aubert and, in 1649, he left the marina site for the right bank of the Galion and built a fort. Some religious built the first church, now the Church of Our Lady of Mount Carmel, shortly afterwards and the city was organized around the chapel and from the fort to the river of Herbs. This was the beginning of Basse-Terre.

=== Birth of the town of Saint-François (circa 1680) ===
Around 1680 on the right bank of the Rivière aux Herbes (River of Herbs) the Capuchins built a chapel dedicated to Saint Francis of Assisi where the present Guadeloupe Cathedral is located and a second centre of population grew around this place of worship. The River of Herbs separated the two distinct villages: Basse-Terre and Saint Francis. In reality, people flocked to the new town because of raids by English privateers who burned the town of Basse-Terre in 1691 and again in 1703. Following these raids the people thought that the fort was attracting foreign privateers and consequently moved to Saint Francis. A stone bridge was built in 1739 replacing a ford and a wooden bridge across the river of Herbs.

=== British occupation (1759–1763) and tentative revival (1763–1789) ===
On 23 January 1759, a British expeditionary force captured the island. Guadeloupe was occupied by the British until 10 February 1763, when it was returned to France in the Treaty of Paris. Basse-Terre experienced a resurgence of activity despite the founding of Pointe-à-Pitre in 1764 – a town in a better position to receive the ocean swell – and despite a fire in September 1782. The town was partially redesigned around 1787.

=== Revolutionary period (1789–1802) ===
The French Revolution reached the island and therefore Basse-Terre in September 1789. In 1793, counter-revolutionary planters agreed to cede the island to the British. They captured Guadeloupe, then governed by Victor Collot, on 22 April 1794 and appointed Thomas Dundas as the new governor. As early as May 1794, Victor Hugues, sent by the National Convention in Paris, managed to recapture the colony and abolish slavery. The French dislodged the cannon in December 1794 and installed a guillotine. The city was the scene of military operations conducted by General Richepanse, who was sent by Napoleon to reestablish slavery, against Louis Delgrès in 1802. Delgrès retreated to the fort on 20 May 1802 and abandoned it on 22 May.

=== Difficult renewal (1802–1870) ===
The town was occupied from 6 February 1810 to 30 May 1814 and again from 10 August 1815 to July 1816. For over 20 years Basse-Terre suffered from the effects of these disturbances. Only after four hurricanes (in 1816, 1821, 1825, and 1844) did Basse-Terre think of rehabilitating the construction and development of the Champ d'Arbaud by building a Military Hospital (now Gerville-Réache High School), a bishopric, sanitation, and expansion of the city by creating new neighbourhoods such as Trianon, Versailles, Petite Guinée, and Petit-Paris but the situation remained unchanged, worsened more by a cholera epidemic in 1865.

=== Renewed activity (1870–1976) ===
From 1870 the commune began to recover and inaugurated its town hall in 1899. It was the first city in Guadeloupe to be electrified in 1913. The impetus came from Ali Tur, who arrived after the cyclone of September 1928 and built the courthouse, the General Council, and a market in the 1930s. A port was built (as wooden quays had previously served as a port) from 1961 to 1964, the boulevard was built in 1962 to serve the port: it was extended in 1964 and again in 1965 along what was once a pebble and black sand beach that ran along the coast. On 26 November 1970, 1.5 inches of rain (38.1 mm) fell in a minute, the heaviest ever recorded. Cyclonic conditions repeatedly ravaged the development of this boulevard in 1989 with Hurricane Hugo and Hurricane Marilyn in 1995, Hurricane Lenny in 1999, and Hurricane Omar in 2008.

=== Since 1976 ===
In 1976 73,600 inhabitants of Guadeloupe were evacuated (from 15 August to 18 November 1976) due to the high activity of the Soufrière volcano. Some evacuees never returned and moved to Jarry. For 20 years, the town centre was depopulated in favour of peri-urban areas or neighbouring towns such Baillif, Saint-Claude, and Gourbeyre despite attempts at renewal.

=== Heraldry ===
Arms of Basse-Terre	The fleur-de-lis symbolise the belonging to France while sun symbolises a tropical island. Blazon: Gules, charged with a sun of Or; in chief Azure 3 fleurs-de-lis Or.

== Administration ==
List of Successive Mayors

Mayors from the French Revolution to 1944

From	To	Name
1790	1792	Jean Baptiste Louis Thirus de Pautrizel
1792		La Graët
1821	1829	Baudet
1831	1837	DuperronN
1837	1843	Jean Rémi Terrail
1843	1846	Charles Le Dentu
1847	1848	Aristide Lignières
1848	1848	J. L. Rousseau
1848	1848	Lomont Bernard
1848	1850	P. H. Laurichesse
1850	1850	Pothonier
1850	1852	P. H. Laurichesse
1853	1854	Puech
1854	1863	Rullier
1863	1869	A. Eggimann
1869	1871	Aristide Lignères
1871	1876	Emile Le Dentu
1876	1883	Richard Jean-Romain
1883	1884	Hildebert Bernus
1884	1888	Auguste Silvie
1888	1893	Hildebert Bernus
1893	1894	J. Cascon
1897	1902	Wilfrid Montout
1897	1900	Delmance Demonchy
1911	1925	Arnaud Lignières
1925	1933	Georges Favreau
1933	1938	Maurice Marie-Claire
1938	1944	Maurice Martin

Mayors from 1945

From	To	Name	Party	Position
1945	1951	Joseph Pitat		Doctor, President of the General Council 1945–1949
1951	1953	Annibal Waneybergue		Retired
1953	1959	Élie Chauffrein	PCF	
1959	1971	Gaston Feuillard		Lawyer, MP 1958–1973
1971	1995	Jérôme Cléry	PCG	Doctor
1995	2001	Lucette Michaux-Chevry	RPR	Lawyer, President of the Regional Council 1992–2004, Senator 1995–2011
2001	2001	Pierre Martin	DVD	
2001	2008	Guy Georges	DVD	Merchant
2008	2014	Lucette Michaux-Chevry	UMP	Lawyer, former Minister, Senator
2014	2020	Marie-Luce Penchard	UMP	Territorial Administrator, former Minister
2020	2026	André Atallah		

=== Judicial and administrative bodies ===
The commune of Basse-Terre has a Courthouse, which was built in 1934 by architect Ali Georges-Tur, and which also houses the Basse-Terre Court of Appeal, a Tribunal d'instance, a High Court an Administrative Court, and an industrial tribunal. The Bar Association of the Bar of Guadeloupe is also established in the commune. Basse-Terre benefits from the presence of a Chamber of bailiffs, a Chamber of Notaries, and a Chamber of Commerce. The prefecture is also present and the city is the seat of the Urban community of South Basse-Terre. There is a police station and a prison.

=== Twinning ===
Basse-Terre has twinning associations with:

- Pondicherry (India) since 1981

== Demography ==
The total number of households in the commune in 2017 was 4,732. Since 2007 the population has been in decline.

Historical population

Year	Pop.	±% p.a.
1954	11,837	—
1961	13,978	+2.40%
1967	15,690	+1.94%
1974	15,457	−0.21%
1982	13,656	−1.54%
1990	14,003	+0.31%

Year	Pop.	±% p.a.
1999	12,410	−1.33%
2007	12,451	+0.04%
2012	11,534	−1.52%
2017	10,058	−2.70%
2023	9,417	−1.09%

Source: INSEE

=== Education ===
The commune has 24 educational institutions:

- 5 public kindergartens: Chevalier St-Georges, Circonvallation, Laure Abel, Petit Paris and Rivière des Pérès
- 5 public primary schools: Elie Chaufrein, Gaston Michineau, Mélanie Milly, Regina Richard, and Rivière des Pérès
- 3 public junior high schools: Joseph Pitat, Les Persévérants, and Pensionnat de Versailles
- 2 public senior high schools:
  - Lycée et lycée professionnel les Persévérants
  - Lycée polyvalent Raoul Georges Nicolo

Former high schools?:

- Lycée général et technologique Gerville Réache
- Lycée général et technologique Pensionnat de Versailles

3 private primary schools:

- Immaculée Versailles
- Jeanne-D Arc
- Saint Paul de Bouillon

Private secondary schools under contract:

- Collège Les Persévérants/LP/LGT Les Persévérants
- LGT/LP/LT Versailles

=== Health ===
Medical institutions in Basse-Terre are among the largest on the island. In 2012 the hospital in Basse-Terre had 235 beds organized into four areas (emergency, surgery, enlarged internal medicine, obstetrics and pediatrics) and had a staff of 850 doctors, hospital and administrative staff. The commune also has a Health Centre.

== Town planning ==
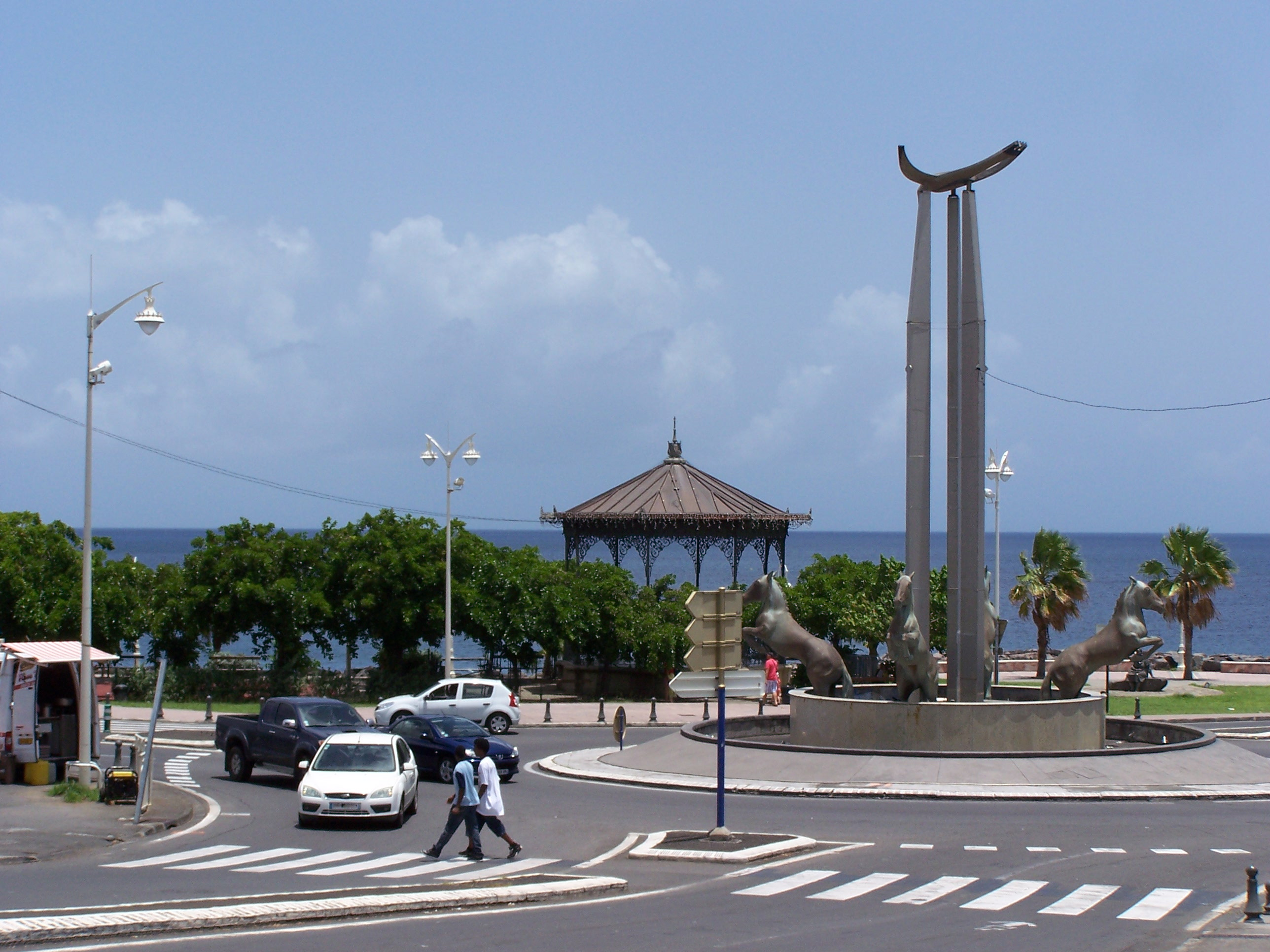
The central roundabout in Basse-Terre, at the intersection of boulevard du Général-de-Gaulle and boulevard du Gouverneur-Éboué

=== Urban morphology ===
360º Panorama of the waterfront of Basse-Terre along the boulevard du Général-de-Gaulle

Over the centuries the commune spread along a street formerly named Grand Rue. The River of Herbs separates two early nuclei of houses which now correspond to the districts of Carmel and Saint Francis. The town developed on a narrow coastal strip between the Caribbean Sea and the first hills of the long mountain ridge that divides the island in two. The volcanic massif of the Soufrière is to the north-east and the mountains of Caraïbes and Houëlmont are to the south-east, which enclose the commune in lush greenery. The city itself stretches over 3 km in spite of a rugged terrain intersected by ravines.

=== Communal territory ===
The boundaries of the commune have varied over the centuries. The colonial Decree of 20 September 1837 endorsed the creation of communes (endorsed on 12 November 1789) and set the powers of the mayor and city council. The territory of Basse-Terre was previously split into two: intra-muros which was the urban part and its inner periphery and extra-muros that extended to the slopes of the Soufrière (although this terminology is used, the city has never been surrounded by walls). In 1837 two new communes were created by cutting extra-muros from Basse-Terre and the future Saint-Claude and Gourbeyre were created. A decision of the municipal council of 15 March 1839 specified the limits of the commune. By 16 October 1953, the commune has grown and included the neighbourhoods of Rivière-des-Peres by the sea as well as Pintade, Thillac, Morne-à-Vaches, Desmarais, Guillard, and Delille.

=== Housing ===
The total number of dwellings in the commune is 6,143 (2017). 77.0% are primary residences. The number of second homes is 80.8% and the number of vacancies is 22.2% which is above the national average of 8%.

== Economy ==
The area of the commune has been greatly reduced since the end of the 19th century and its mountainous terrain does not allow it to develop large-scale farming. Only the Bologne distillery, a rum producer, remains significant and is one of the jewels of local production shared with the commune of Baillif. The city, as capital of the department, hosts major administration establishments as well as the Chamber of Commerce and Industry of Basse-Terre.

There has been development of the economic sector through improving the reception of cruise ships and passengers in the port of Basse-Terre. The first stone for the ferry terminal was laid on 27 December 2013. The modern terminal has a capacity of 100 people with areas for ticketing and restaurants was opened on 2 October 2015.

=== Employment ===
The unemployment rate in 2017 for the town was 40.7% out of a total workforce of 4,286 individuals.

Division of employees into type of activity (2017)

	Agricultural workers	Tradesmen, shopkeepers, company directors	Managers and Professionals	Middle managers	Employees	Workers
Basse-Terre	0.9%	6.2%	3.7%	16.1%	39.9%	20.0%
Source of data: INSEE

== Culture and heritage ==
The commune has a very large number of buildings and sites that are registered as historical monuments. Some of the most interesting are shown below.

=== Civil heritage ===
- Fort Delgrès (formerly Fort Saint-Charles), built by Charles Houël in 1649; thereafter many governors expanded it and made substantial changes. It was taken and retaken several times. It had several names: Fort Houël (1650–1794), renamed Fort Matilda by the British (1794), Fort Richepanse (30 March 1803 – 1810), again Fort Matilda (1810–1814 and 1815–1816), again Fort Richepanse (1816–1960), Fort Saint Charles (1960), and Fort Delgrès (since 1989). Classified as a historical monument by order of 21 November 1977.
- The Gerty Archimede Museum opened in 1984 in the house where the lawyer and politician Gerty Archimede lived.
- The Town hall was built in 1889. For the Tercentenary celebrations of linking the West Indies to France Georges Rohner made ??seven paintings to decorate the building, between 1934 and 1936. The seven paintings in the town hall are registered as historical objects:
  - A Painting: Portrait of Victor Schoelcher (1937)
  - A Painting: Horseman talking to a woman and small boy (1937)
  - A Painting: Workman carrying a hand of bananas (1937)
  - A Painting: Two fishermen shaking their nets with a woman (1937)
  - A Painting: Two fishermen shaking their nets (1937)
  - A Painting: Basse-Terre bay (1937)
  - A Painting: Women talking under a tree (1937)
- The Courthouse buildings were all built by Ali Tur. It is used for all of the courts of the prefecture including the Court of Appeal and High Court. It is classified as historical monuments by order of 15 December 1997.
- The Market Clock located inside the City spice Market dates from 1932 and is also the work of architect Ali Tur.
- The Lycée général et technologique Gerville-Réache was built in the 1st quarter of the 19th century when it housed a military hospital. In the 1950s this was converted into the school. It was classified as a historical monument by order of 15 January 1979.
- The Regional Council of Guadeloupe was recently built (1991–1993) and houses the offices of regional councilors and the President of the Regional Executive.
- The General Council of Guadeloupe was built on the site of the former General Council building. It has been listed as a historical monument since 1997.
- The Prefecture of Guadeloupe on the site of the former military hospital destroyed by fire in 1794. It was a military district which was formerly called the "Barracks of Orleans" in the 19th century. The current building was built by Ali Tur between 1932 and 1935 and was called the "Palace of Orleans" or the "Palace of the Governor". It was not until 1951 that the prefectural administration settled there. It was classified as a historical monument by order of 15 December 1997.

=== Religious heritage ===
- The Cathedral of Our Lady of Guadeloupe was built over a wooden chapel that was built in the 18th century when it was called Saint Francis Church. It was not until 1877 that it was dedicated to Our Lady of Guadeloupe. The cathedral was listed as a historical monument (MH) on 17 June the 1975. Its annex buildings are the seat of the Diocese of Basse-Terre and Pointe-à-Pitre.
- The Bell Tower of the Cathedral was built in 1837 and recently renovated recently and is separated on the back of the cathedral without. It was classified as a historical monument on 19 May 2006.
- The Church of Our Lady of Mount Carmel was built by the first colonists and more precisely by monks in the 17th century. It marked foundation of Basse-Terre. It was classified as a historical monument on 20 April 2006. The church contains several items that are registered as historical objects:
  - A Cabinet (18th century)
  - A Processional Cross (18th century)
  - A Monstrance (1704)
  - A Funeral plaque for Jean Louis Honoré d'Hesmivy (18th century)
  - A Funeral plaque for François Charles de Bourlamaque (18th century)
  - A Sculpture (18th century)
- The Saint Antoine Monastery was founded in 1897 as a charitable hospice and property of the Saint Vincent de Paul congregation. It was listed in 2007 as a historical monument.

=== Festivals ===
- The Auditorium Jérôme Cléry and a theatre with 500 seats called L'Artchipel
- The 'Festival Patronale on 12 December
- The Festival of Carmel on 16 July

=== Sport ===
Sports facilities in the commune:

- Sports Palace of Rivière-des-Pères (1600 seats)
- Stadium of Rivière-des-Peres (4000 seats)
- Inter-communal Swimming Pool at Rivière-des-Peres
- Félix-Éboué Stadium
- Multisports halls

They are used by sports clubs:

- The Cygne Noir, football
- La Gauloise, football
- The Racing Club of Basse-Terre, football
- The Étoile du Carmel, football
- The Basse-Terre Rugby Club (BASTRUC), rugby

=== Media ===
The TV channel Guadeloupe I and radio Guadeloupe I are available in the commune.

=== Picture gallery ===
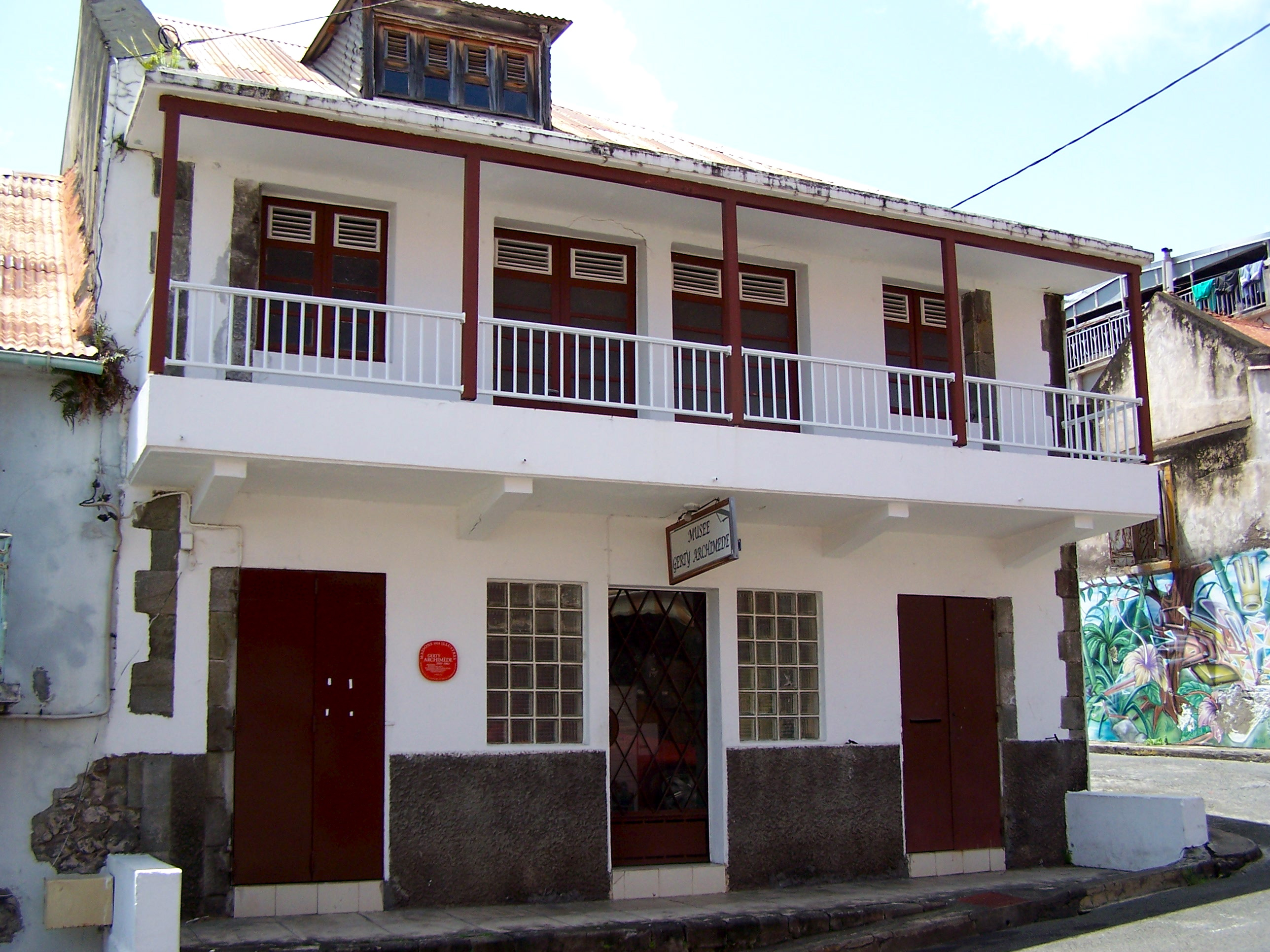
The Gerty Archimede Museum

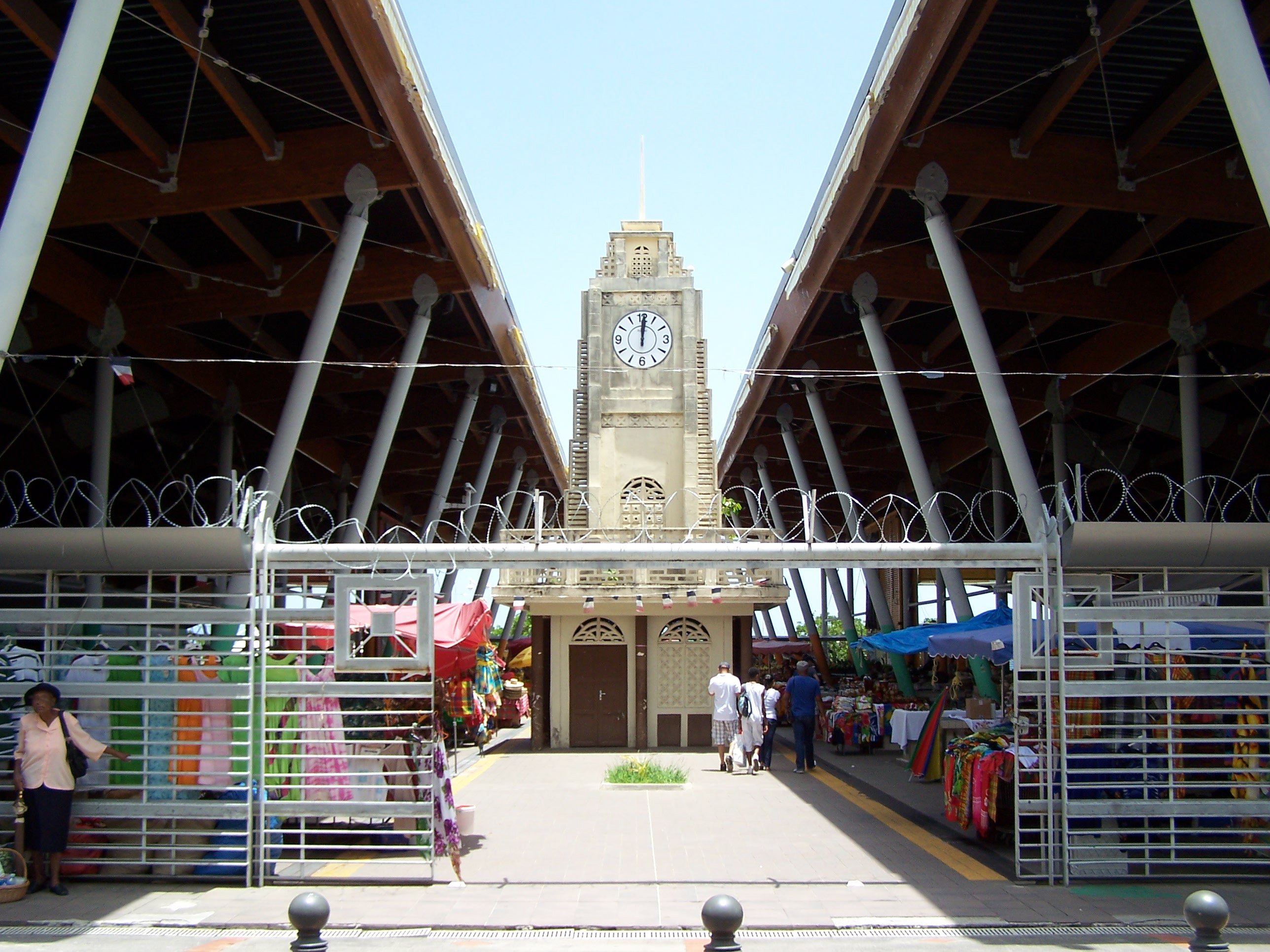
The Spice Market and its clock

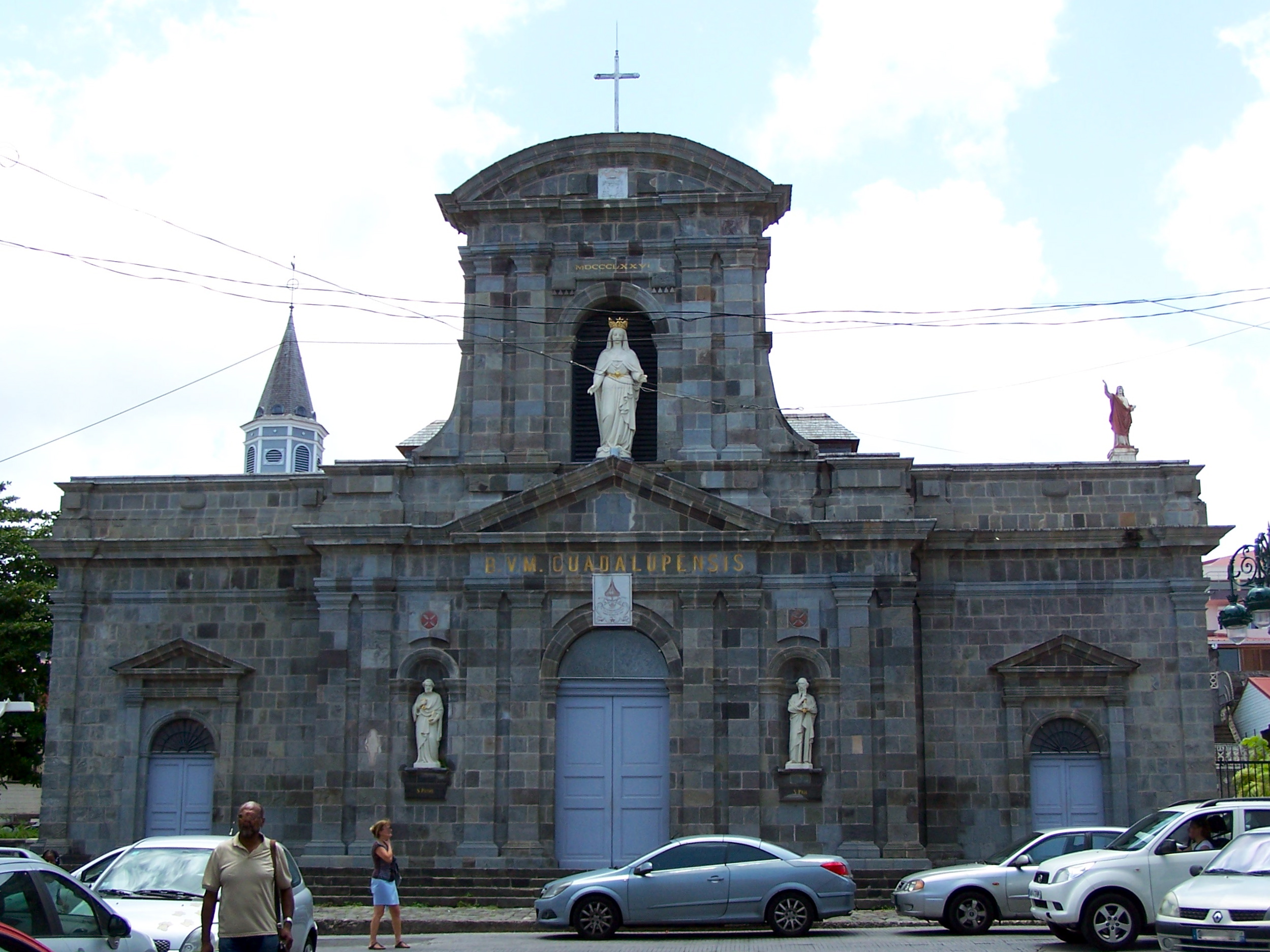
Basse-Terre Cathedral

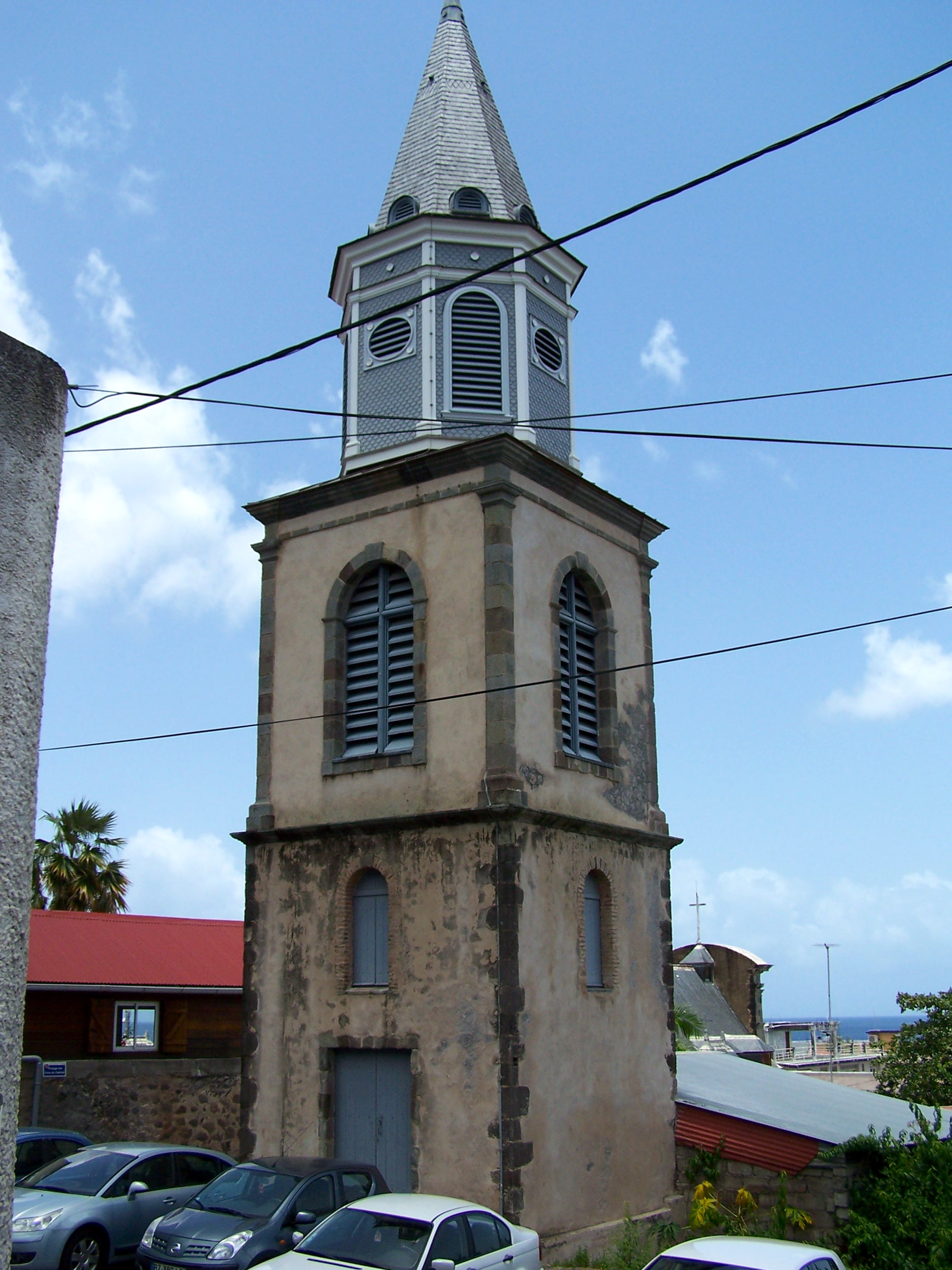
The cathedral bell tower

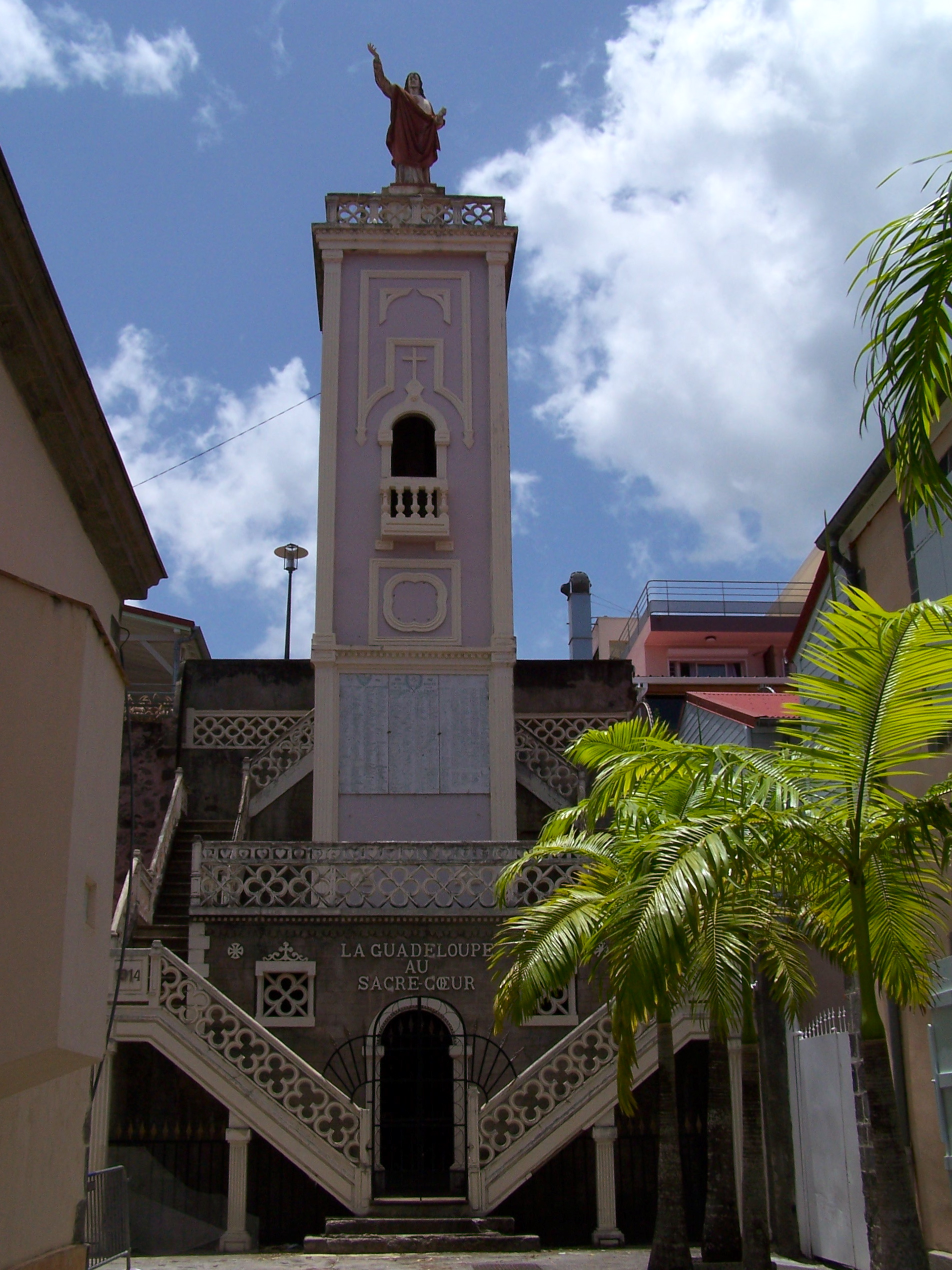
The seat of the Diocese of Basse-Terre and Pointe-à-Pitre

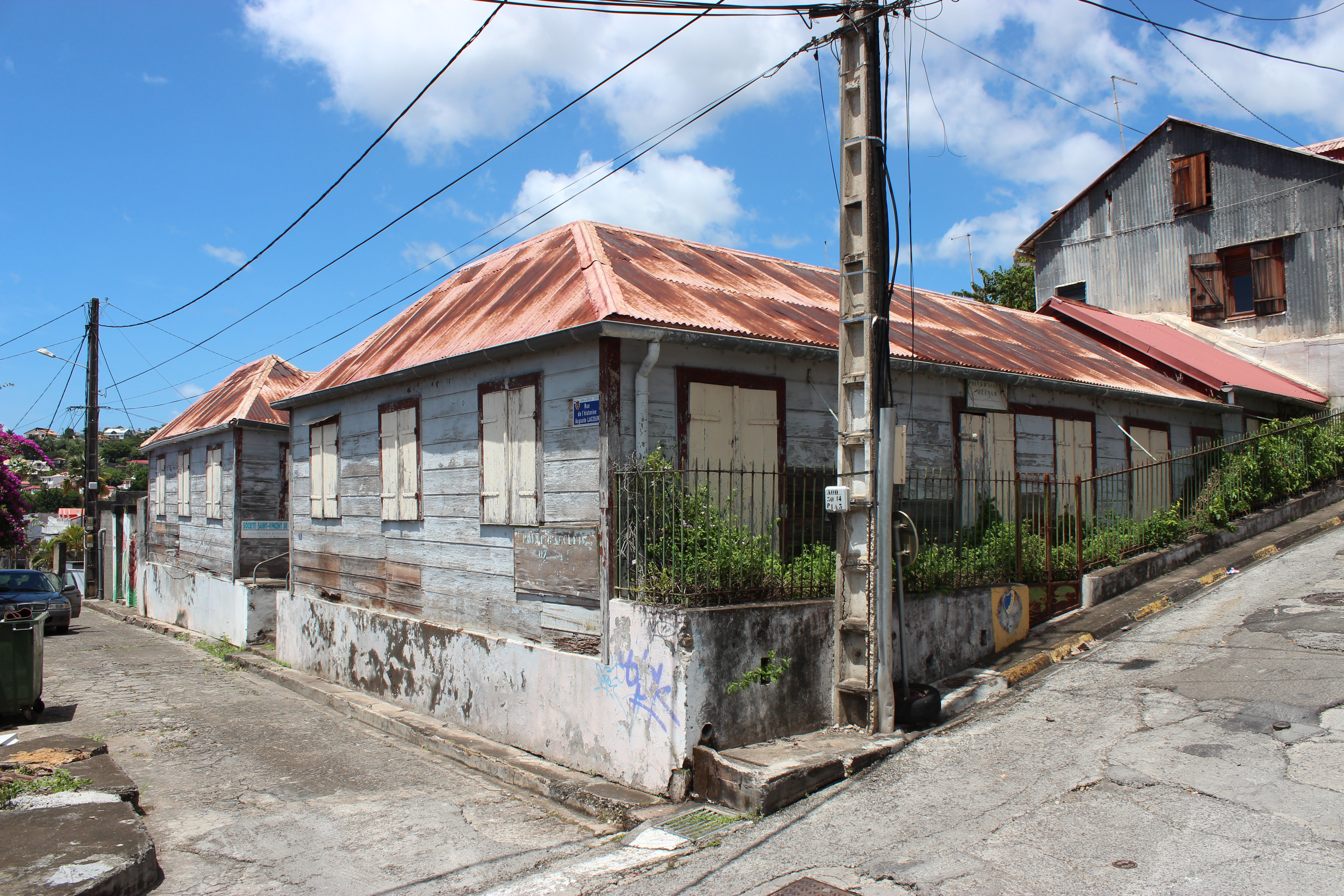
The Saint-Antoine Monastery

== Notable people linked to the commune ==
- Charles Houël du Petit Pré, founder of Basse-Terre in 1649
- Jacques-Nicolas Gobert, born in Basse-Terre on 22 May 1760; a Major-General in the French Revolution
- Jean-Jacques Ambert (1765–1851), General of the armies of the Republic and the Empire, born in Saint-Céré (Lot), died in Basse-Terre
- Louis Joseph Amour de Bouillé du Chariol (1769–1850), General of the armies of the Republic and the Empire
- Louis Delgrès, born on 2 August 1766 at Saint-Pierre, Martinique and died on 28 May 1802 at Matouba in Guadeloupe, Guadeloupe hero, Commandant of Basse-Terre in 1802
- Antoine Richepanse, born at Metz on 25 March 1770, named chief of the expedition to Guadeloupe by Napoléon Bonaparte, he embarked in 1801 with order to quell the uprising of Louis Delgrès. He succeeded but, having contracted yellow fever, he died on 3 September 1802 at the age of 32 years at Basse-Terre. He is buried in Fort Delgrès.
- Ferdinand Joseph L'Herminier, born in 1802 at Basse-Terre and died in 1866 at Pointe-à-Pitre; botanist and zoologist
- Louisy Mathieu, born on 2 February 1817 at Basse-Terre and died on 4 November 1874; slave, cooper, and print worker; MP for Guadeloupe, 1848–1849
- Léon Hennique, born at Basse-Terre on 4 November 1850 and died in Paris on 25 December 1935; naturalist novelist and playwright
- Camille Mortenol (1859–1930), ship's captain; student with exceptional ability in mathematics
- Élie Bloncourt, born at Basse-Terre on 5 May 1896, MP for Aisne and a fervent Resistance fighter during the Second World War
- Gerty Archimede, born on 26 April 1909 at Morne-à-l'Eau (Guadeloupe), died at Basse-Terre on 15 August 1980, the first woman admitted to the bar in Guadeloupe in 1939 and deputy to Mayor Élie Chauffrein (1953–1956)
- Paul Niger, real name Albert Béville; writer, administrator, and militant; born on 21 December 1915 at Basse-Terre and died on 22 June 1962 in an air accident at Deshaies
- Joseph Aucourt, footballer; born at Basse-Terre on 12 January 1927; played for RC Basse-Terre and FC Girondins de Bordeaux (1952–1955)
- Guy Hatchi, former French footballer; born on 18 March 1934 at Basse-Terre (Guadeloupe); played for CS Sedan Ardennes and Olympique Lyonnais
- Jacques Rousseau, French athlete, born on 10 March 1951 at Basse-Terre; champion of Europe in long jump in 1978
- Willy Salzedo, born at Basse-Terre in 1961; pianist, author, composer, producer, arranger; major composer of Caribbean songs for over 20 years
- Luc Sonor, born on 15 September 1962 at Basse-Terre, international French footballer, played for AS Monaco and FC Metz and consulted at Canal+
- Evelyne Elien, born on 24 March 1963 at Basse-Terre; French athlete specialising in 400 metres
- Tanya Saint-Val, singer born in 1965 in the commune
- Élie Domota, born in 1967 in the commune, Guadeloupean unionist and spokesman for Liyannaj Kont Pwofitasyon in créole, or LKP (collective against outrageous exploitation), leading member of the 2009 French Caribbean general strikes which occurred in January and February 2009
- Marie-José Pérec, born at Basse-Terre on 9 May 1968; triple Olympic champion: in 1992 at the 1992 Summer Olympics at Barcelona in the 400 metres and twice at the 1996 Summer Olympics in Atlanta in the 400 metres and 200 metres
- Jean-Pierre Cyprien, footballer born at Basse-Terre on 12 February 1969, notably won the jersey for Olympique de Marseille
- Jane Fostin, born on 27 December 1973 at Basse-Terre; Guadeloupean singer and former member of the group Zouk Machine
- Rony Martias, born on 4 August 1980 at Basse-Terre; racing cyclist
- Sonia Petro, Deputy Mayor since 2020.
- Indira Ampiot, born in 2004 and crowned Miss France 2023
- Minia Biabiany, born at Basse-Terre in 1988; artist

== See also ==
- Communes of the Guadeloupe department
