= Élie Domota =

Élie Domota (born in 1963) is a trade union leader from Guadeloupe, spokesman of Liyannaj Kont Pwofitasyon or LKP (« Movement against exploitation » in creole) and general secretary of the UGTG, the main trade union in Guadeloupe. He was the leading figure in the general strike in Guadeloupe which started on January 20, 2009.

Born in Bas-du-Bourg, a poor neighborhood of Basse-Terre, Élie Domota is the third child of a family of six. His father was a carpenter and his mother was a cleaning lady. He joined the Young Christian Workers at the age of 14.

He studied in Limoges, where he obtained a DUT of management, before graduating in economic and social management, and in urban planning. He went back to Guadeloupe in 1991 after his studies, and is now deputy head of the ANPE of Morne-à-l'Eau. He is married with three children.

During the 2009 strikes on the island, he allegedly made repeated called out white minority of the island, warning that employers in Guadeloupe either "implement the agreement or they leave Guadeloupe. We are quite firm on this. We won't let a bunch of white bosses (using the Creole term békés, used often to refer to white settlers) re-establish slavery."

He also spoke of respect and love for other Caribbean nations stating the same history and the same fight.

== See also ==
- 2009 French Caribbean general strikes
- Liyannaj Kont Pwofitasyon
- Union générale des travailleurs de Guadeloupe
