= Jacques Bino =

Jacques Bino (died February 18, 2009) was a Guadeloupean tax agent, activist and trade union official and representative. Bino was the first person killed during the violence associated with the 2009 French Caribbean general strikes.

Bino was an active participant in the first month of the general strikes in Guadeloupe. However, Bino was shot and killed shortly after midnight on Wednesday, February 18, 2009, as he drove home from a protest. Bino approached a group of armed youths who were manning a makeshift barricade in the city of Pointe-à-Pitre. The crowd opened fire on Bino's car. Bino's car was hit three times by 12-gauge Brenneke-style shotgun slugs. One of the shotgun blasts came through the front windshield of the car, striking Bino in the chest and killing him.

There were no police in the area when Bino was killed. Jean-Michel Pretre, a local Guadeloupean prosecutor, has speculated that the youths, who were operating independently from the official strikes, may have mistaken Bino for a plainclothes police officer when they opened fire. Point-à-Pitre Mayor Jacques Bangou noted following Bino's death that, "For the past 48 hours the streets have been in the hands of groups of young people, completely out of control."

Bino's murder may have marked a turning point in the general strikes, with both the French government and the LKP union groups beginning to take serious notice of the conflict.

Bino's funeral was held on Sunday, February 22, 2009. His funeral was attended by former French Socialist presidential candidate Ségolène Royal, who arrived on Saturday to attend his memorial service. Royal used the solemn occasion to criticize the government of French President Nicolas Sarkozy saying the government had "abandoned" Guadeloupe and urging it to find “solutions” to the crisis."

Jacques Bino was 50 years old at the time of his murder. He was survived by his wife, Marie-Antoinette Bino, who lives in Pointe-à-Pitre.
