= Confédération générale du travail de Guadeloupe =

CGTG
- General Confederation of Labour of Guadeloupe
- Confédération générale du travail de Guadeloupe
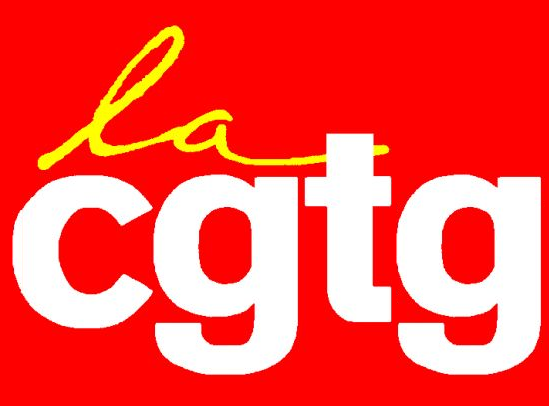
- Founded: 1962
- Headquarters: Pointe-à-Pitre
- Location: Guadeloupe (France)
- Members: 5,000 (2003)
- Key people: Jean-Marie Nomertin, General Secretary
- Affiliations: World Federation of Trade Unions

Confédération générale du travail de Guadeloupe ('General Confederation of Labour of Guadeloupe') is a trade union centre in Guadeloupe. CGTG was founded in 1962, as the Guadeloupean federation of the French Confédération générale du travail became an independent centre. CGTG is particularly strong amongst banana plantation workers and in the Basse-Terre area.

Historically, CGTG is linked to the Guadeloupe Communist Party (PCG). In 1965, CGTG began publishing Tribune Ouvrière ('Workers' Tribune).

In 2000, the PCG party congress adopted a new line of action, calling for street protests, strikes and civil disobedience in order to pressure the French state to allow a new stature for Guadeloupe. The PCG congress also stated that the party would support trade union struggles, even if not directly led by the party. These adjustments opened up for more cooperation between CGTG and the independentist trade union centre UGTG.

In January 2002, a member of the Trotskyist group Combat ouvrier, Jean-Marie Nomertin, was elected General Secretary of CGTG at a meeting of the CGTG Executive Committee. A deal was struck between militants of PCG and Combat ouvrier. Nomertin, previously general secretary of CGTG-Banane, succeeded PCG militant Claude Morvan. Morvan had been the general secretary 1975-2002. Before Morvan, Hermann Songeons was the general secretary of CGTG.

In the 2002 election to the Guadeloupean Joint Industrial Tribunal, CGTG came second with 15 out of 48 seats. 28% of employees participated in the vote. In 2008, CGTG won 14 seats.

As of 2003, CGTG was estimated to have 5,000 members.

In December 2008, CGTG took part in organizing a general strike in Guadeloupe, along with other trade union centres, political parties and social movements, gathered in Liyannaj Kont Pwofitasyon. The strike was organized in order to demand lowering of petrol prices and increase of wages.

== Affiliated unions ==
- The banana plantation workers' union in CGTG is CGTG-Banane. Pierrot Berancier is the general secretary of CGTG-Banane.
- The teachers' union affiliated with CGTG is Syndicat de l'Enseignement Public - Confédération Général du Travail de la Guadeloupe. Aude Girondin is the general secretary of SEP-CGTG.
- The builders' union affiliated with CGTG is the Fédération des Travailleurs de la Construction CGTG. The union is affiliated to the Trade Unions International of Building, Wood and Building Materials Industries (UITBB), one of the professional internationals inside the World Federation of Trade Unions.
- In the health sector, the CGTG affiliate is CGTG-Santé.
- In the banking sector CGTG is present through the Fédération CGTG des Organismes Financiers, a continuation of the previous Union Syndicale des Employés de Banques et Cadres CGTG.
