= Louisy Mathieu =

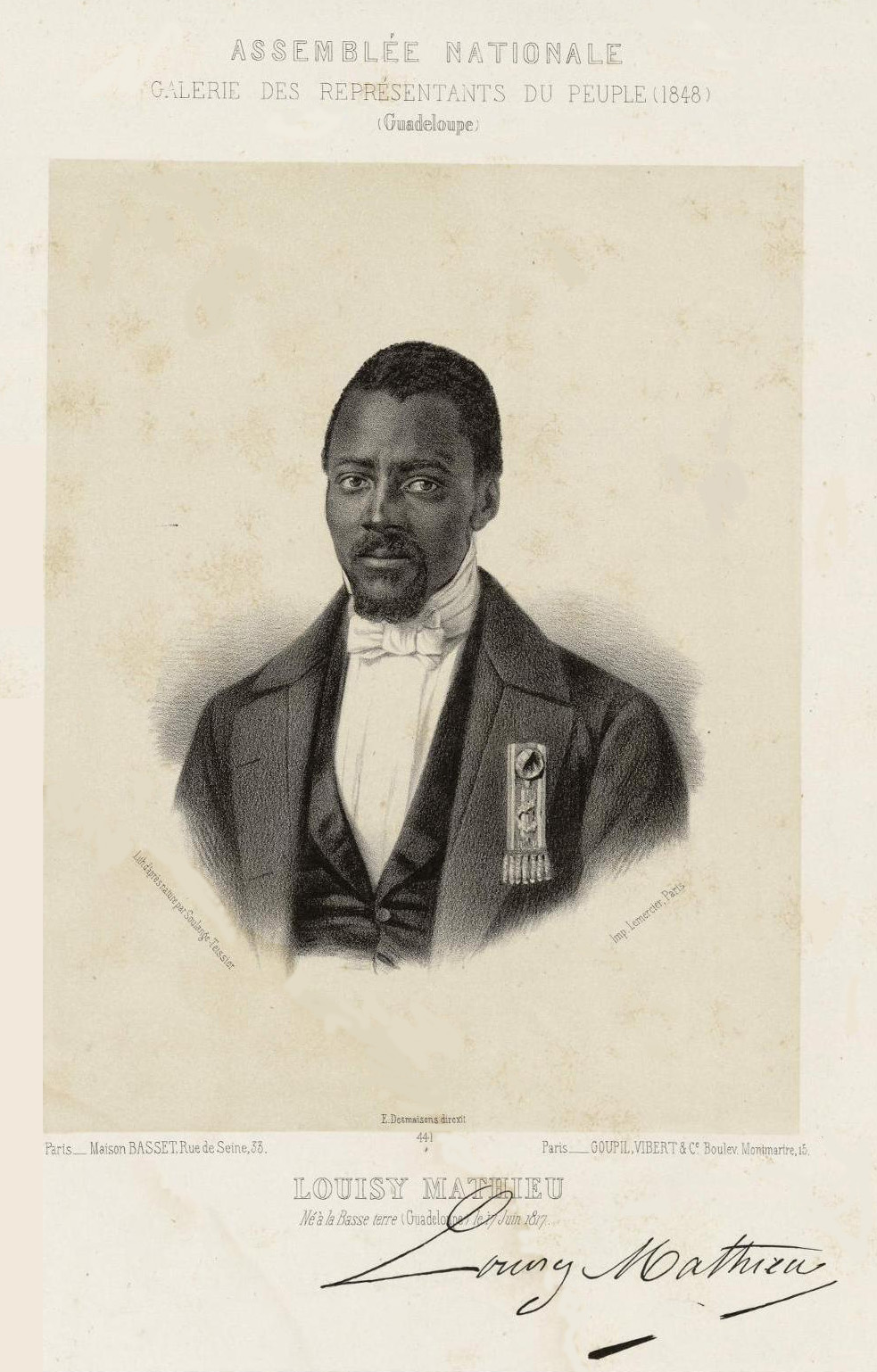

Member of the Constituent Assembly
- In office 1848–1849

Personal details
- Born: 17 June 1817 Basse-Terre, Guadeloupe, Kingdom of France
- Died: 4 November 1874 (aged 57) Basse-Terre, Guadeloupe, French Republic
- Party: Montagnard

Louisy Mathieu (17 June 1817 in Basse-Terre, Guadeloupe – 4 November 1874 in Basse-Terre) was a politician from Guadeloupe who served in the French Constituent Assembly from 1848–1849 as a Montagnard. He is the first freed slave to sit in the Constituent Assembly.

Mathieu was a print-worker representing Pointe-a-Pitre. His first speech spoke about his wish for a better relationship between blacks and whites in the colonies, but it was received poorly by the assembly and he served only one term after losing his seat in the subsequent election.

== Gallery ==
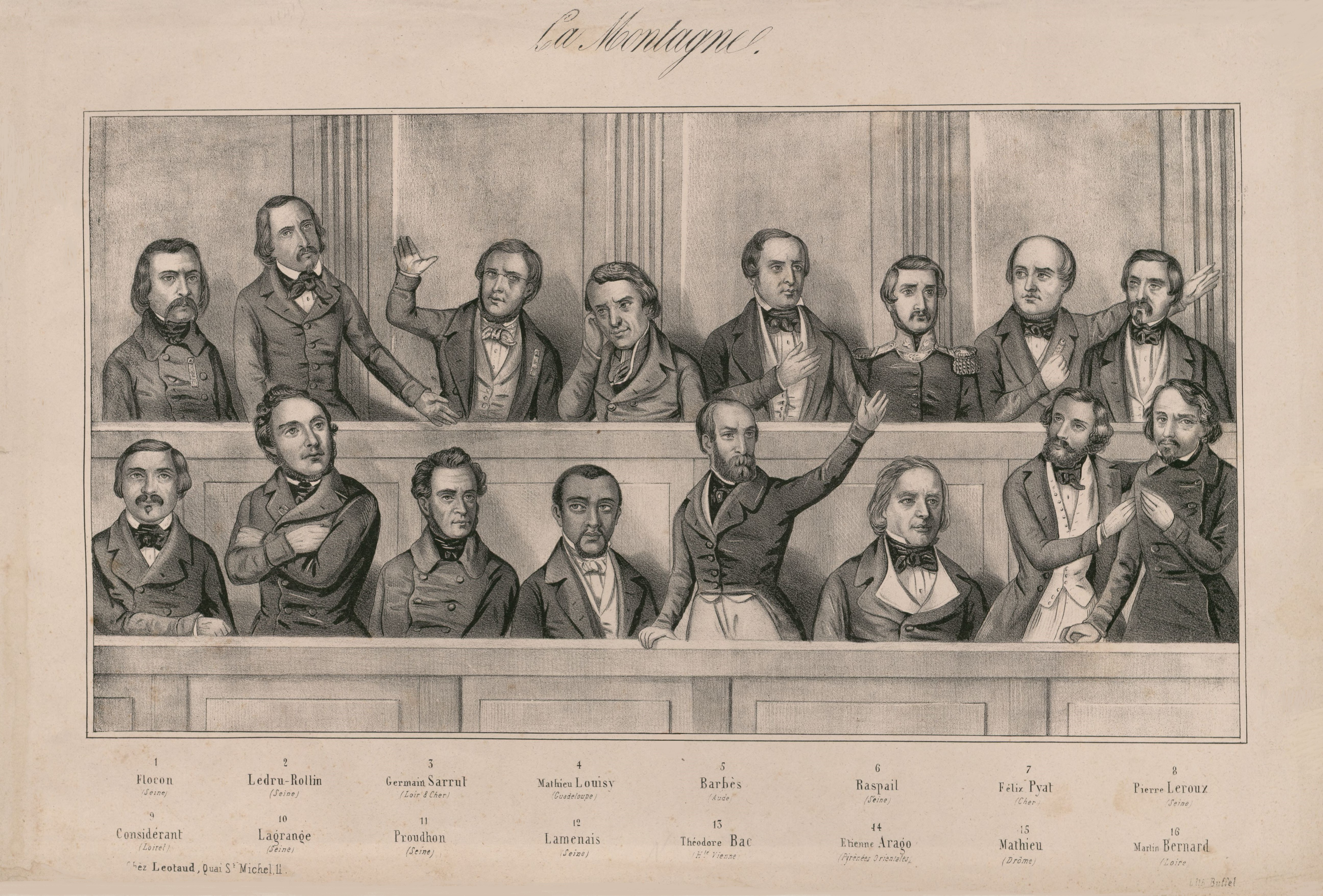
Mathieu seated among fellow Montagnards in the Constituent Assembly, 1848

== See also ==
- Jean-Baptiste Belley
