= Basse-Terre Cathedral =

Cathedral in Guadelopue

Coordinates: 15°59′45″N 61°43′47″W

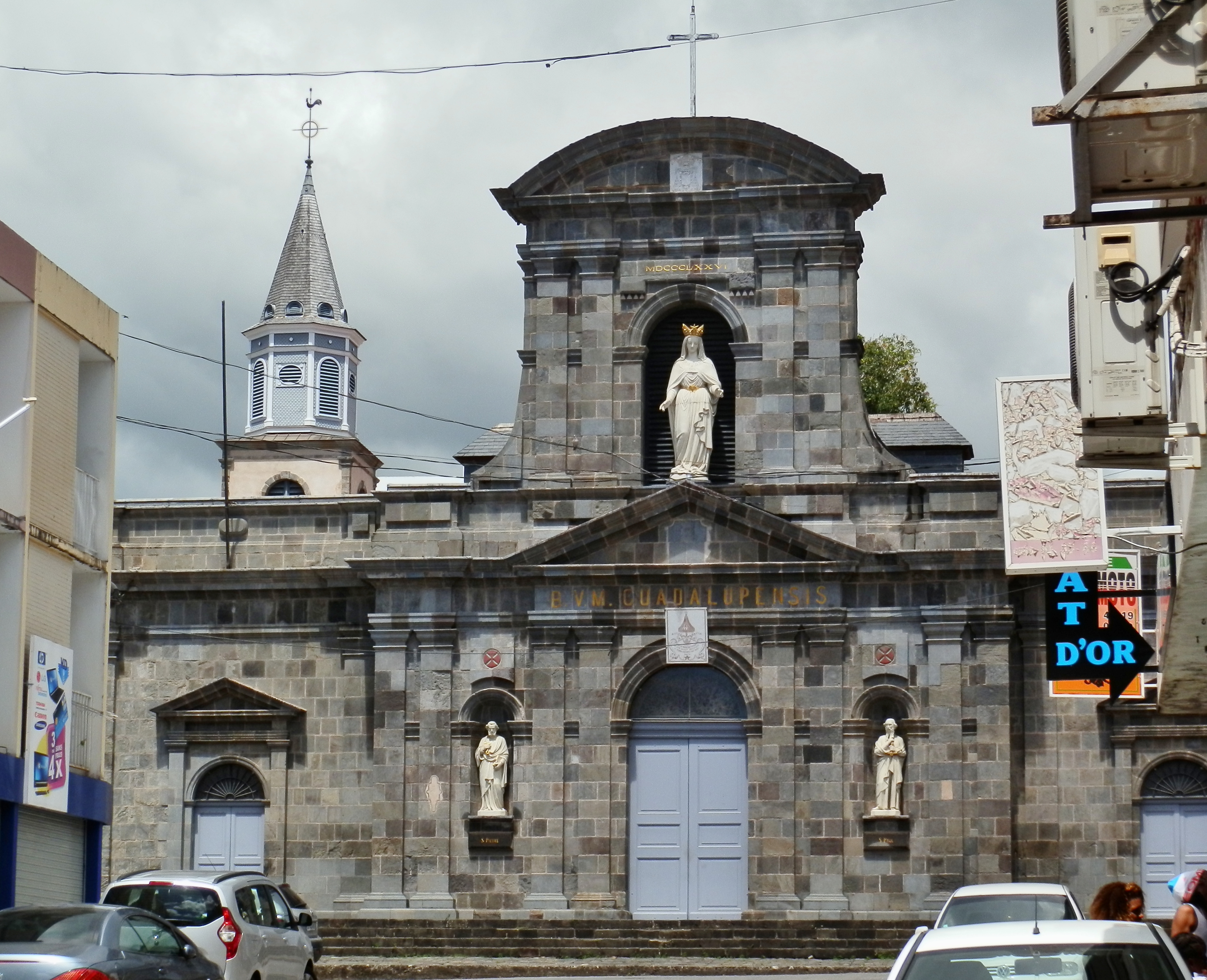
Façade of the cathedral

Basse-Terre Cathedral (French: Cathédrale Notre-Dame-de-Guadeloupe de Basse-Terre) is a Roman Catholic cathedral dedicated to Our Lady of Guadalupe and a national monument of France, in the town of Basse-Terre in Guadeloupe.
