= 2009 French Caribbean general strikes =

Protests

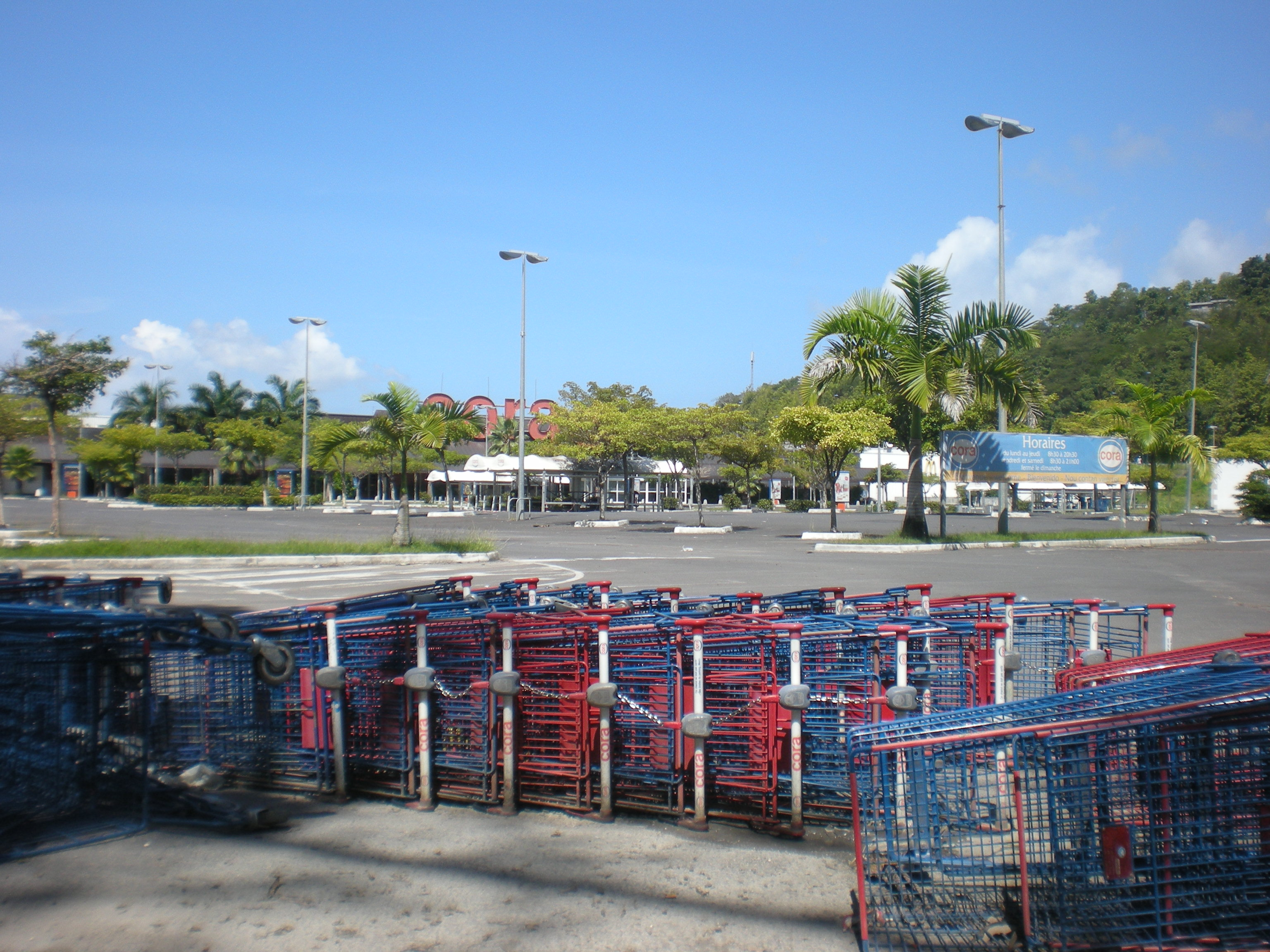
A deserted shopping centre in the Bas du Fort district of Le Gosier, which was blockaded by strikers

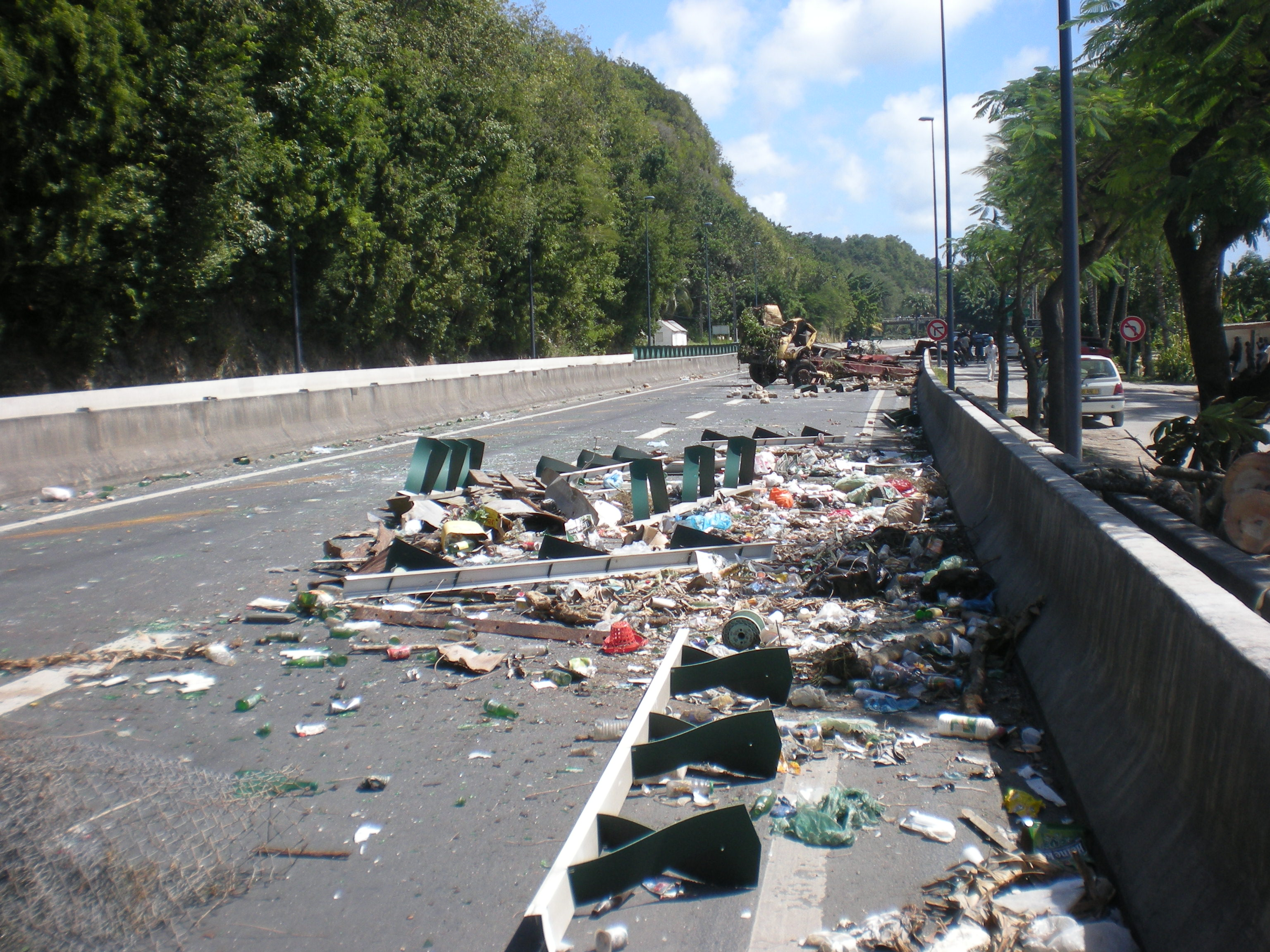
A road block near Le Gosier, Guadeloupe, during the strikes

The 2009 French Caribbean general strikes began in the French overseas region of Guadeloupe on 20 January 2009, and spread to neighbouring Martinique on 5 February 2009. Both islands are located in the Lesser Antilles of the Caribbean. The general strikes began over the cost of living, the prices of basic commodities, including fuel and food, and demands for an increase in the monthly salaries of low income workers.

Stores and gas stations in the private sector, and public sector services including education, public transportation, and sanitation, were temporarily closed in Guadeloupe and Martinique due to the strikes. The strikes ended when the French government agreed to raise the salaries of the lowest paid by €200 and acceded to the strikers' top 20 demands.

The strikes exposed deep ethnic, racial, and class tensions and disparities within Guadeloupe and Martinique and devastated the tourism industry of both islands during the high season. The islands were believed to have lost millions of dollars in tourism revenue due to cancelled vacations and closed hotels. Guadeloupe and Martinique had the second and third highest unemployment rates in the European Union as of 2007, according to Eurostat.

== Background ==
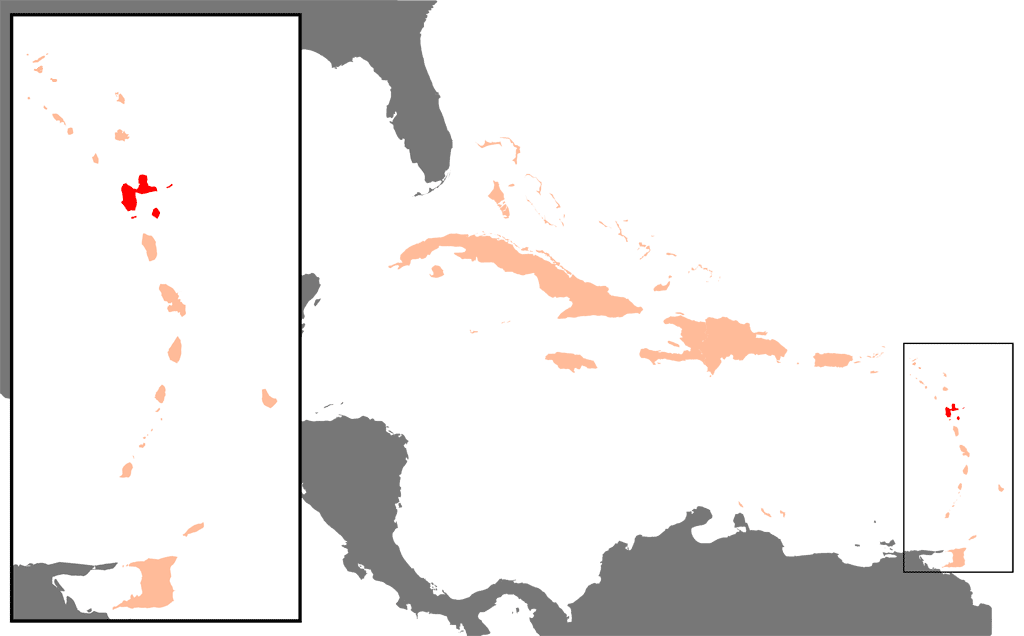
Guadeloupe's location within the Caribbean region

Residents of Guadeloupe and Martinique, whose economies are dependent on tourism, have a very high cost of living. Many residents feel that their salaries are not keeping up with the rising cost of food, utilities and other necessities. The prices of basic commodities and food staples are much higher in Guadeloupe and Martinique than in Metropolitan France. The high prices are caused by the higher costs of importing products into the islands.

The average salary in Guadeloupe, the cause of the first general strike, is lower than in Metropolitan France although the unemployment and poverty rates on both islands are twice as high. Both islands are supported by subsidies from the French government.

Four French overseas territories had the highest unemployment rates in the European Union in 2007: Réunion, Guadeloupe, Martinique, and French Guiana. Guadeloupe also has the highest youth unemployment rate in the European Union, with 55.7% in the 15-to-24-years age group unemployed.

=== Race ===
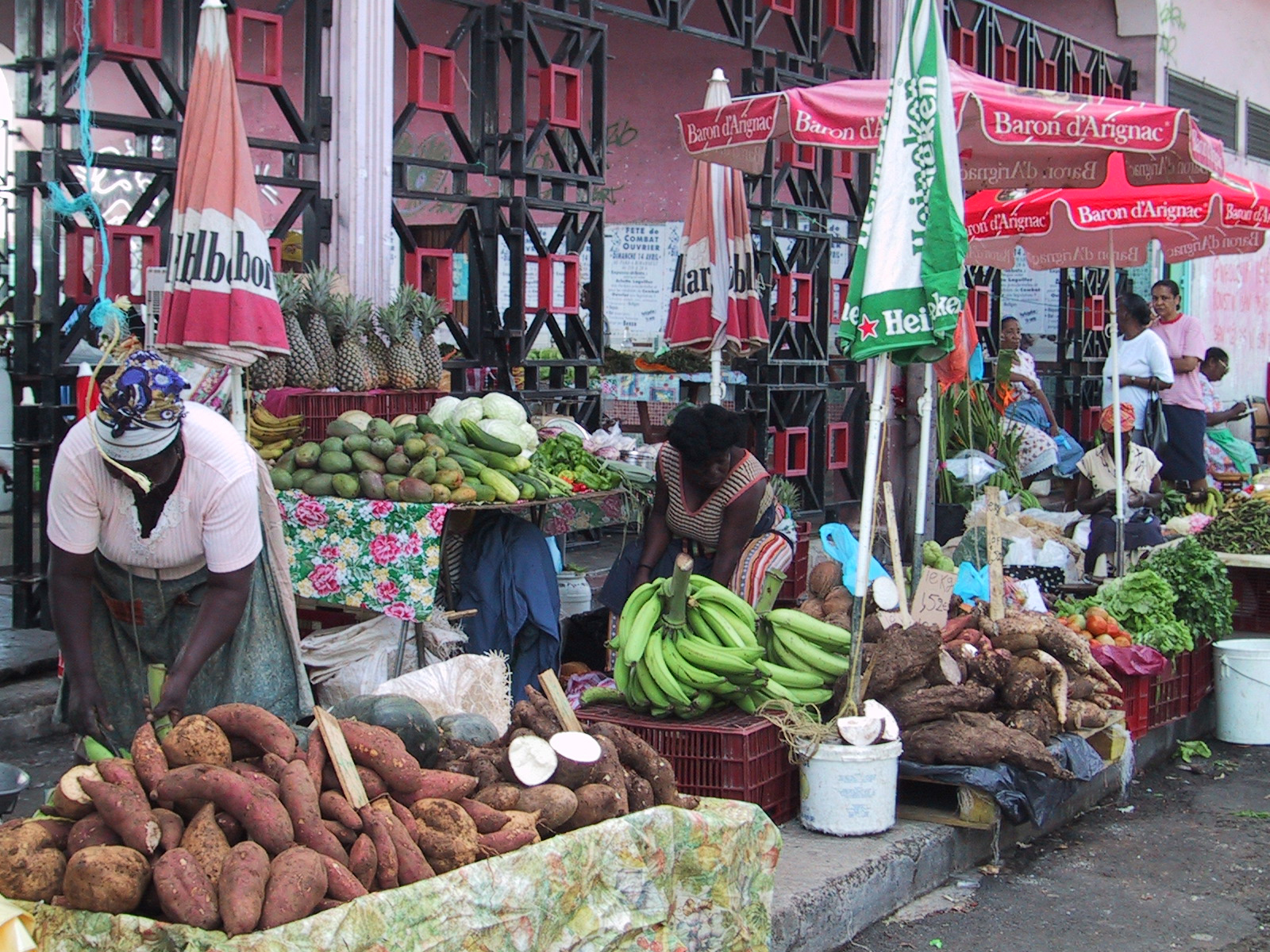
The market in Pointe-à-Pitre

The structure of the economy of the French Caribbean, a legacy of the colonial era, complicated the 2009 crisis. Most of Guadeloupe's and Martinique's largest land and business assets are controlled by the "békés", the white European descendants of the islands' settlers. The békés' ancestors had been the islands' colonists and slave holders. The majority of the Guadeloupean and Martiniquean populations, who are of Black African or mixed race descent, live in relative poverty (to the békés). For example, the békés of Martinique comprise 1% of the island's 401,000 population, and control most of the island's industries.

The residents of both Guadeloupe and Martinique are considered to be full French citizens. The euro is the official currency on both islands. The government and the day-to-day decisions affecting both islands are made in Paris, located thousands of miles away. Working families, especially lower-income families, have complained that it is difficult to pay for basic necessities due to the high cost of living. 70% of residents in Pointe-à-Pitre, Guadeloupe's largest city, currently reside in public housing.

The islands are also afflicted by a number of other societal problems. The homicide rate in Guadeloupe is four times higher than that of Metropolitan France. Protesters in Guadeloupe and Martinique accused the French government of ignoring their economic and political concerns during the 2008 financial crisis.

== Guadeloupe ==
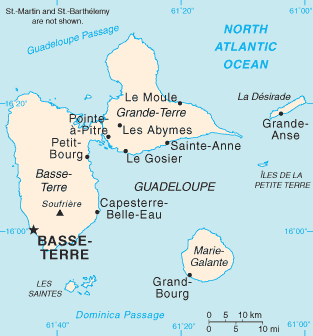
A map of Guadeloupe

The protests initially began in Guadeloupe on 20 January 2009. An umbrella group of approximately fifty labour union and other associations known in the local Antillean Creole as the Liyannaj Kont Pwofitasyon (LKP) called for a €200 (US$260) monthly pay increase for the island's low income workers. The protesters proposed that authorities "lower business taxes as a top up to company finances" to pay for the €200 pay raises. Employers and business leaders in Guadeloupe said that they could not afford the salary increase.

Approximately 50,000 Guadeloupeans were reported to have taken part in the demonstrations. The Liyannaj Kont Pwofitasyon (LKP), which launched the protests, is also known as the "Collective Against Extreme Exploitation" in English or the "Collectif contre l'exploitation outrancière" in French.

The government of France sent the Junior Minister of Overseas France Yves Jégo to Guadeloupe to negotiate with disgruntled employees and protesters. He proposed a deal to increase the salaries of 45,000 Guadeloupean workers by about $300. Jégo triggered much criticism among Guadeloupean strikers when he suddenly returned to Paris on Monday 9 February for a crisis meeting with French Prime Minister François Fillon.

Jégo's departure for the meeting in Paris with Prime Minister Fillon and other ministers was denounced by union leaders as a sign of "contempt" for LKP and their supporters during a time of crisis. Demonstrations erupted across Guadeloupe in response to Jégo's trip to France. More than 10,000 people marched in Pointe-à-Pitre, the largest city in Guadeloupe, while an additional 1,500 protesters gathered in Basse-Terre, the capital city.

Protesters chanted, "la Gwadloup se tan nou, la Gwadloup a pa ta yo, yo peke fe sa yo vle an peyi an nou", which translates to "Guadeloupe is ours, it is not theirs, they will not do what they want in our country." Demonstrators forced the closure of local stores and businesses in those cities. However, the stores reopened as soon as the protesters passed by.

Jégo returned to Guadeloupe (and Martinique) later in the week. Guadeloupean protesters remained angered by his perceived slight. A leader of the LKP, Élie Domota, told France Inter radio that, "The mediators have nothing new to tell us. They came supposedly to bring the parties closer together but they know nothing about the situation here. We are saying that the state has to help small Guadeloupe businesses to develop, to have access to bank credits, and also to pay for our wage increases."

Jégo's original proposal, which would have increased the salaries of at least 45,000 workers by nearly US$300 per month, quickly fell apart. The unions demanded that the government alleviate extra cost by slashing payroll taxes. The French government flatly rejected the idea of cutting payroll taxes. The LKP thus suspended negotiations with mediators on Thursday 12 February 2009.

George Pau-Langevin, a French Socialist MP who was born in Guadeloupe but represents a portion of Paris, said that Guadeloupeans were not just protesting low incomes, but also "the indecent profits of big fuel and import-export companies." Guadeloupean deputy Victorin Lurel denounced the high price of fuel on the island as a "scandal."

The main shipping container terminal at the port in Pointe-à-Pitre was closed and barricaded by protesters. Most Guadeloupean banks, schools, and government offices remained closed throughout the duration of the strike. All of Guadeloupe's 115 gas stations were closed in response to the strike. The strikes resulted in sporadic power outages and limited running water as utility workers walked off their jobs to join the protests. Supermarkets remained closed, and food imports were halted.

The strikes hit at the height of Guadeloupe's main tourism season. Guadeloupe depends on tourists, especially from France, for a significant portion of its economic income. Several hotels closed temporarily and charter flights from France and other parts of the Caribbean were canceled. Club Méditerranée, known more widely as Club Med, closed its main hotel on Guadeloupe in late January. Thousands of French tourists canceled their vacations to Guadeloupe as a result of the strike.

=== Escalation ===
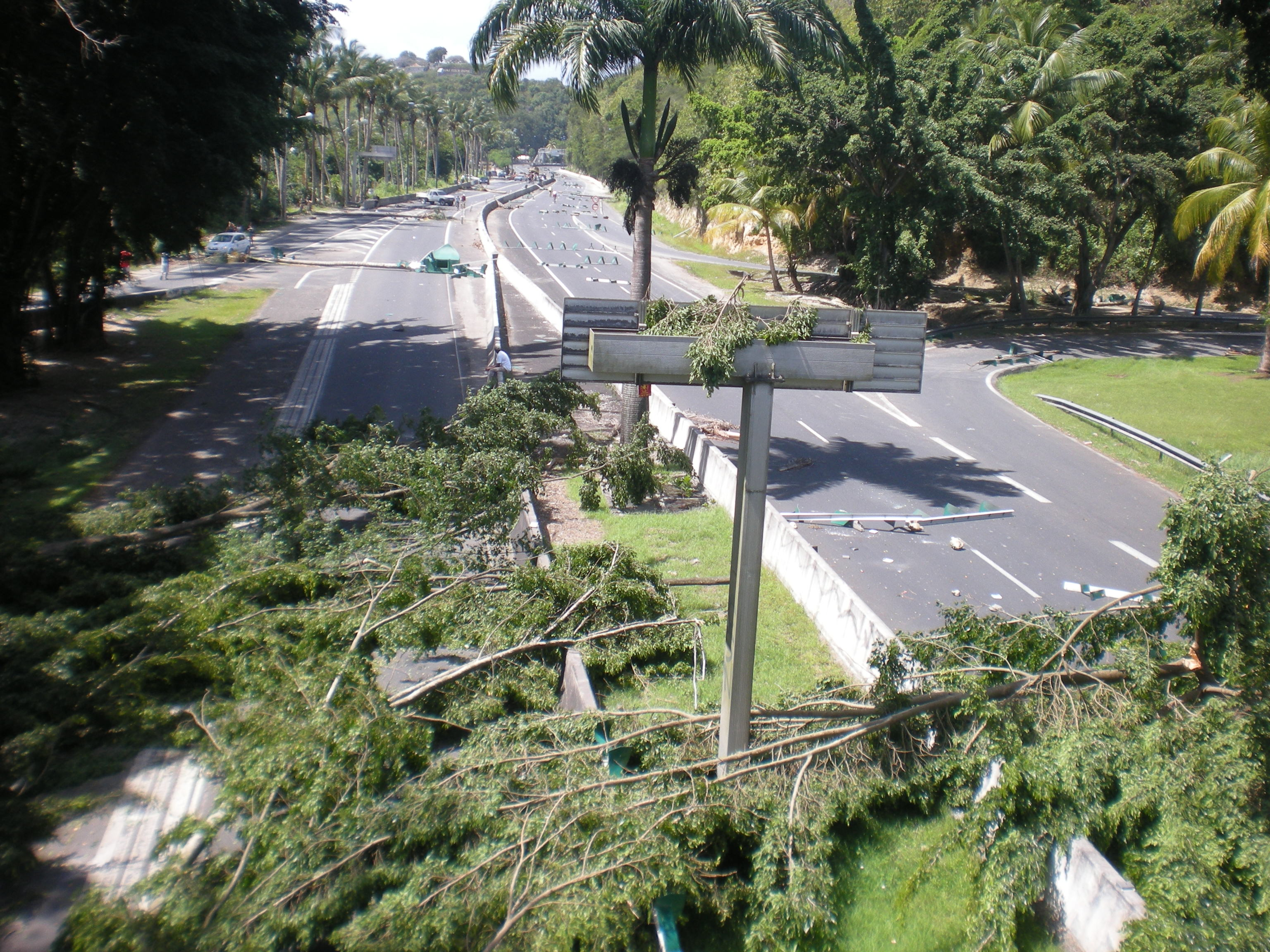
A road block on the RN4, near Le Gosier

After four weeks, the general strike on Guadeloupe escalated into rioting on Monday, 16 February 2009. Protesters clashed in several municipalities across the island, including the largest city, Pointe-à-Pitre, and the northern town of Sainte-Rose.

Guadeloupe's main airport, Pointe-à-Pitre International Airport, was closed because debris was thrown on the runway, causing American Airlines to cancel all flights. Cars and trees were set on fire in the centre of Pointe-à-Pitre. A group of about sixty protesters clashed with two squadrons of police, who responded by firing tear gas. Police arrested approximately fifty people after protesters threw stones at them as the police tried to remove makeshift barricades in Pointe-à-Pitre. Most of those who were detained were later released after large crowds gathered outside the city's main police station.

Protesters wearing hooded sweatshirts burned pallets and trashcans to block roads around the southern town of Le Gosier. Victorin Lurel, the Socialist leader of the Regional Council of Guadeloupe, described the situation on Guadeloupe as "on the verge of revolt." French Interior Minister Michèle Alliot-Marie called for "calm, responsibility and restraint."

Armed "youths" manning a makeshift roadblock shot and killed a local union representative in the city of Pointe-à-Pitre just after midnight on Wednesday, 18 February 2009. The victim, Jacques Bino, a 50-year-old tax agent and union member who was returning home from protests elsewhere, was the first person killed during the strike. Bino's car was hit three times by 12-gauge Brenneke-style shotgun slugs. Several police officers were also injured in the overnight violence. Unions leading the strikes called for a deescalation of violence on the island. Elie Domota, a leader of the LKP, told protesters, "Don't put your life in danger – don't endanger the lives of others."

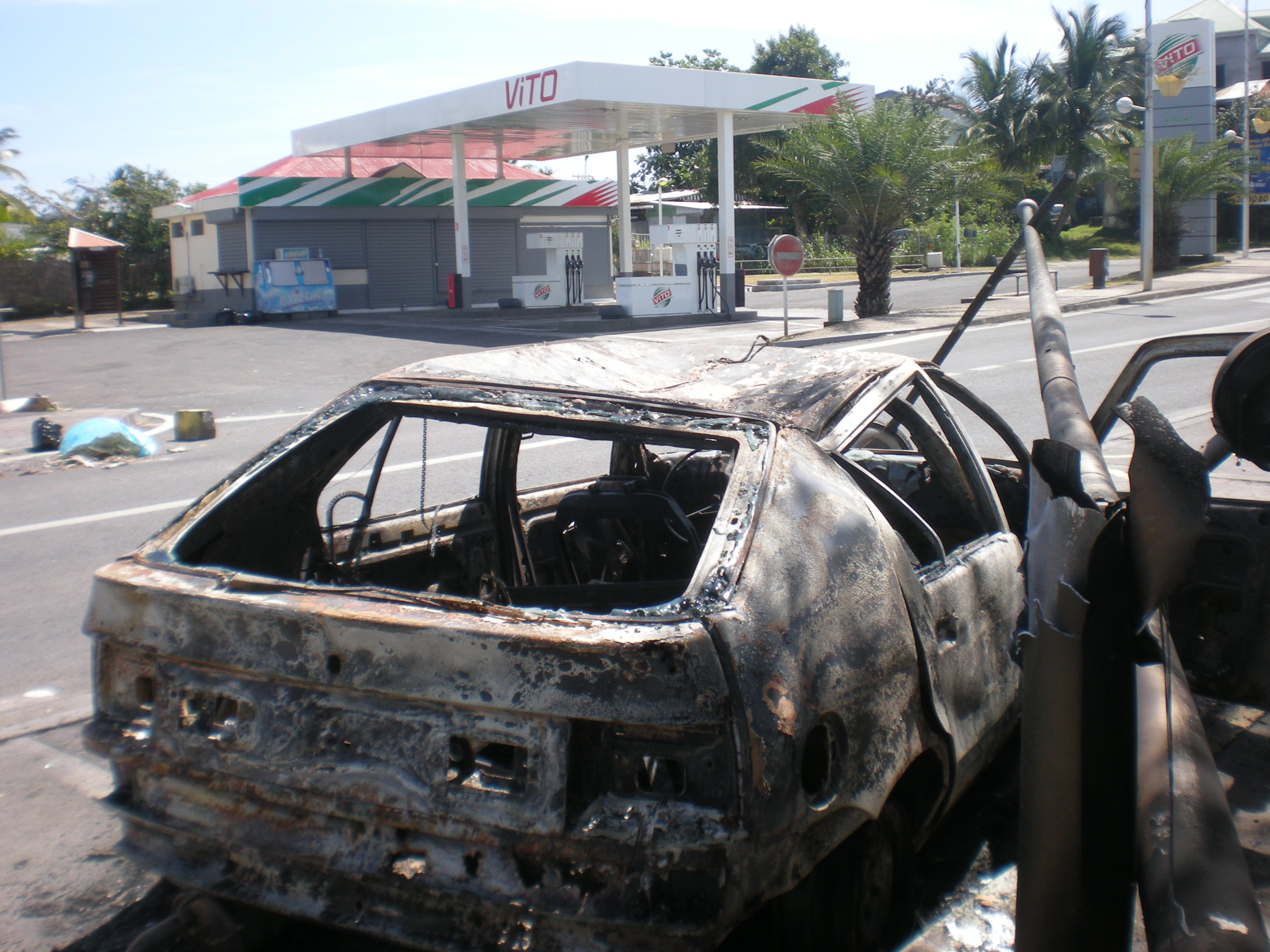
A closed gas station near Le Gosier, after a night of violence

The situation across the island continued to deteriorate throughout the day on Wednesday, 18 February. The mayor of Pointe-à-Pitre, Jacques Bangou, reported that three policemen were wounded by gunfire in the Cite Henri IV section of the city. Police fired tear gas to break up rioters, but Mayor Bangou told the AFP that there were still "exchanges of gunfire" in the neighborhood. A correspondent for AFP reported hearing more "blasts" in the city just before 0400 GMT on Wednesday.

Elsewhere, looters attacked a shopping center and ransacked a perfumery and a tire store. A number of police officers were also injured when a group of up to 100 youths "rampaged" though the commercial district of Destrelland in the town of Baie-Mahault and fired guns at police, according to Baie-Mahault's mayor, Ary Chalus.

More than 500 French police officers arrived in Guadeloupe on 19 February in an attempt to quell the ongoing violence following Bino's death. The deployment occurred after a third straight night of violence. Dozens of police officers landed in the southern town of Sainte-Anne, Guadeloupe, where protesting youths stormed and occupied the town's city hall. Sainte-Anne Mayor Richard Yacou said that the city hall was not damaged, but nearby businesses in the town were looted and burned. Rioters also fired weapons at police and burned at least five stores and restaurants in Le Gosier. Police dismantled the barricades leading to the main airport, which allowed tourists to leave the island.

=== Negotiations resume ===
Victorin Lurel, the president of Guadeloupe's regional council, demanded that the French government stop the violence and address underlying tensions. In response to the riots, President Nicolas Sarkozy announced a meeting of the elected leaders of the French overseas territories "to respond to the anxiety, the worry and a certain form of despair of our compatriots overseas."

On 19 February, it was reported that the French government had offered to increase low earners' income by almost €200, in line with unions' demands. Negotiations between the government and the LKP were suspended on Friday, 25 February, partially in response to the funeral of Jacques Bino over the weekend. Talks resumed the following Monday. Representatives of the LKP met with French officials and business leaders in the city of Pointe-à-Pitre. Outside hundreds of demonstrators gathered, chanting, "We're here to negotiate" and "Guadeloupe belongs to us, it's not theirs."

== Martinique ==
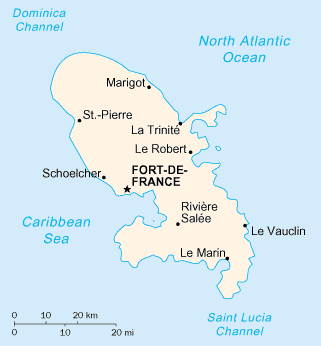
A map of Martinique

The strike spread to neighbouring Martinique beginning on 5 February 2009. Protesters paralysed Martinique's capital city, Fort-de-France. An estimated 11,000 people had taken part in the demonstrations on Martinique in the first seven days of the strike, according to the local police. Martiniquean unions disagreed with the estimates, arguing that the protesters had numbered at least 25,000 individuals. Demonstrators carried pro-trade union signs and wore red shirts, representing the official color of the local unions.

Protesters in Martinique demanded a monthly salary increase of nearly US$580 for all workers earning minimum wage on the island. They also called for a reduction in monthly electricity and water bills for Martinique residents.

Government and transportation leaders reportedly agreed to reduce freight costs. In response, business leaders on Martinique agreed to lower the prices of 100 basic products, including food, by 20%.

Martiniquean residents were reportedly shopping only at small, family-run grocery stores, as most large stores remained closed during the protests. Demonstrators were reported to have stormed most major chain supermarkets and forced them to close. Gas stations, which were closed in response to the strike, were serving only medical and emergency workers.

Colonel François-Xavier Bourges, the police chief of Martinique, said that ten people had been arrested for stealing gasoline or looting. France deployed 130 riot police from mainland France to Martinique on 12 February 2009, to "ensure that order is maintained."

The tourism industry on Martinique grew increasingly impatient with the strikers and the lack of basic services. Benoit Le Cesne, the president of Martinique's hotel association, expressed concern over the potential negative effects on the tourism industry, "There are basically no more supplies, neither of gas nor food, and laundry services are no longer operating. If this continues, professionals will no longer be able to guarantee services promised to tourists." Unlike in Guadeloupe, the Club Med Buccaneer's Creek resort in Martinique remained open through the strike.

On Monday, 16 February, protesters allowed 28 of Martinique's 85 gas stations to reopen and be resupplied. Residents and tourists lined up for hours to fill their cars' gas tanks. All small businesses who had reopened over the weekend were forced to close again. Protesters also blocked industrial areas of the island and the city centre in Fort-de-France.

On Thursday, 20 February 2009, Fort-de-France Mayor Serge Letchimy announced the cancellation of Martinique's annual four-day Carnival, citing the ongoing general strike and the death of union activist Jacques Bino on neighboring Guadeloupe. Martinican police had criticized Letchimy's decision to hold the Carnival, saying that they did not have enough time to prepare due to the strike. The Carnival would have begun on 22 February. The annual carnival usually attracts 50,000 people to Fort-de-France. It was the first time in history that the festival had been cancelled.

=== Martiniquan racial tensions ===
The protests in Martinique began to take on racial and class undertones due to the economic stresses. The békés, descendants of French European settlers, continue to hold most of the island's industrial capacity.

Racial tensions rose during the first week of February after an hour long documentary, entitled The last masters of Martinique (Les derniers maîtres de la Martinique in French), was broadcast on a French television channel. The premise of the documentary was that the ethnically white French community had continued to dominate Martinique's economy throughout its history. Tensions were especially inflamed when a French businessman, Alain Huygues-Despointes, was quoted as saying that historians should explore "the positive aspects of slavery" and that Martinique's mixed-race families lacked "harmony." Following those statements, Martinique's Prefect Ange Mancini, who had been renting a home from Huygues-Despointes, announced that he had terminated a lease agreement with Huygues-Despointes and had moved to a new residence. The French government announced that it would open a criminal investigation into Huygues-Despointes following his controversial remarks.

On Friday 13 February 2009, approximately 2,000 protesters marched while chanting slogans against Martinique's béké minority. The marchers, who were predominantly of the African majority descent, chanted, "Martinique is ours, not theirs!"

== Reaction of French government ==
French President Nicolas Sarkozy did not mention those events in his one-hour-and-a-half television talk of 5 February 2009. He acknowledged later the grievances of the strikers in his first remarks on the crisis, "There cannot be a two-speed society in which one part gets richer while the other stagnates and depends on benefits".

Sarkozy ordered the government on 13 February 2009 to begin a review of France's policies towards its overseas territories. Sarkozy simultaneously announced the creation of a new government council to review policy toward all French overseas territories, a promise that he had made during the presidential campaign of 2007. He called for a "distribution des richesses" (distribution of wealth) to alleviate the societal and economic ills afflicting Guadeloupe and Martinique.

French government ministers were asked to propose new long-term measures intended to modernise and stimulate the economies of both islands. Sarkozy suggested that the government may open up the islands' economies to more economic competition but did not appear strongly to support the wage increases demanded by protesters; "We should beware of false good ideas for a short-term end to the conflict".

Sarkozy sought to reassure residents that the government was not ignoring their concerns. He said that "Guadeloupe and Martinique are part of France" and that the islands' residents "have the sentiment that they are not always heard. We should continue to fight, every day, so that the country makes a larger place for those who represent the diversity of France".

== Ending the strikes: the Jacques Bino Accord ==
The strikes ended on 4 March 2009, when the French government agreed to raise the salaries of the lowest paid by €200 and granted the LKP their top 20 demands. The agreement was named the "Jacques Bino Accord" to commemorate the union activist killed during the strike. According to the Australian Green Left Weekly, 30,000 people marched through the streets of Pointe-à-Pitre on 7 March to celebrate the victory.

French President Nicolas Sarkozy visited Martinique and Guadeloupe in June 2009, as part of an effort to heal the rifts caused by the strikes. While ruling out full independence, which he said was desired neither by France nor by Martinique, Sarkozy offered Martiniquans a referendum on the island's future status and degree of autonomy.

During his visit to Guadeloupe, Sarkozy likewise asserted that "Guadeloupe is French, and will remain French." LKP representatives refused to meet him. LKP calls for anti-Sarkozy demonstrations met with little response, with no more than 1,000 people attending.

== Other French protests ==
A coalition of labour unions in Réunion, a French overseas region in the Indian Ocean located thousands of miles from Guadeloupe and Martinique, announced their own general strike scheduled for 5 March 2009, in support of the Caribbean strikes. An alliance of unions in French Guiana, which is located in South America, also threatened to strike, saying their workers suffered the same low wages and low quality of life as those in Guadeloupe and Martinique.

Martine Aubry, the leader of the French Socialist Party, warned of the risk that the protests could spread further to mainland France in an interview with Le Parisien. Following the settlement ending the strikes, trade unions in the French mainland were reported to "have rejected the idea of trying to bring about in mainland France what has happened in Guadeloupe". Far-left leader Olivier Besancenot, however, was happy to cite the strikes in Guadeloupe as an inspiration and "an example to reflect on and follow".

== See also ==
- 2017 social unrest in French Guiana
