= Jean-Pierre Cyprien =

French footballer (born 1969)

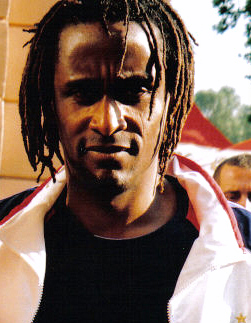

Personal information
- Date of birth: 12 February 1969 (age 57)
- Place of birth: Basse-Terre, Guadeloupe
- Height: 1.85 m (6 ft 1 in)
- Position: Defender

Senior career*
Years	Team	Apps	(Gls)
1986–1990	Le Havre	81	(8)
1990–1994	Saint-Etienne	140	(2)
1994–1995	Torino	2	(0)
1995–1996	Rennes	32	(3)
1996–1997	Neuchâtel Xamax	24	(1)
1997–1999	Lecce	58	(2)
1999–2000	Marseille	7	(0)
2000	Salernitana	0	(0)
2000–2001	Crotone	20	(2)
2002–2003	Fréjus	16	(0)
2004–2005	Pau		
2007–2008	Cagnes		

International career
1994	France	1	(0)
- * Club domestic league appearances and goals

Jean-Pierre Cyprien (born 12 February 1969) is a French former professional footballer who played as a defender for various clubs in France and Italy.

== Honours ==
Neuchâtel Xamax

- Swiss Super League runner-up: 1996–97
