= Hégésippe Ibéné =

Hégésippe Ibéné (born 8 April 1914 in Sainte-Anne, Guadeloupe - Sainte-Anne 28 May 1989) is a politician from Guadeloupe who served in the French National Assembly from 1973 to 1978 representing Guadeloupe's 1st constituency. Boulevard Hégésippe-Ibéné in Saint-Anne is named after him.
