= Guadeloupe Communist Party =

Guadeloupe Communist Party Parti communiste guadeloupéen
- Abbreviation: PCG
- Secretary-General: Alain-Félix Flémin
- Vice Secretary: Mona Cadoce
- Founded: 30 March 1958
- Headquarters: Pointe-à-Pitre
- Newspaper: Etincelle ("Spark")
- Ideology: Communism; Marxism; Guadeloupean autonomy
- National affiliation: New Popular Front (2024–present)
- International affiliation: IMCWP

Party flag

The Guadeloupe Communist Party (French: Parti communiste guadeloupéen, PCG) is a political party in the French overseas department of Guadeloupe. The party publishes the newspaper Etincelle (meaning "Spark").

== History ==
A federation existed in the French Communist Party before 30 March 1958. The PCG was founded as a party at its first congress in 1958, in the town of Capesterre. In the 1968 legislative elections for the French National Assembly, the PCG received 37.3% of the popular vote; one of three deputies from Guadeloupe in the French Parliament was a communist. In 1973 one of the cofounders of the party, Hégésippe Ibéné, was also elected to the French National Assembly.

The PCG participated in the 1960 and 1969 International Communist and Workers Parties. The PCG approved the documents adopted by these meetings.

The second party congress of the PCG was held in 1961, and the main political task of the party was identified as uniting all workers in the pursuit of the provision of Guadeloupe internal autonomy within the French republic. The third party congress, held in 1964, adopted a political, economic and social program for achieving autonomy, covering demands for the establishment of local legislative assembly and executive body, agrarian reform, and development cooperation, among other things. In 1965, factional conflict erupted in the party leadership. A dissident faction was expelled from the party between 1966 and 1967. In late 1967, at the initiative of PCG, the Young Communist Union was founded. The fourth party congress was held in 1968.

In 1971, Guy Danent was the First Secretary of the party. The party had, in the same year, 1,500 members, and occupied significant positions in 10 of 34 municipalities in Guadeloupe, including eight mayors. The PCG also enjoyed influence in a few trade unions, including the General Confederation of Labour of Guadeloupe and the Union of Guadelopuean Women.

Ahead of the 2015 French regional elections, PCG nominated Mona Cadoce as its candidate for regional president. She obtained 1,297 votes (0.92% of the votes cast).

== Organisation ==
The party was built with democratic centralism as its organizing principle. The primary organization of the party is the cell; then there is the section and the supreme organ is the party congress. Between congresses PCG is headed by Central Committee and Politburo Central Committee.
