= Jacques Bangou =

French politician

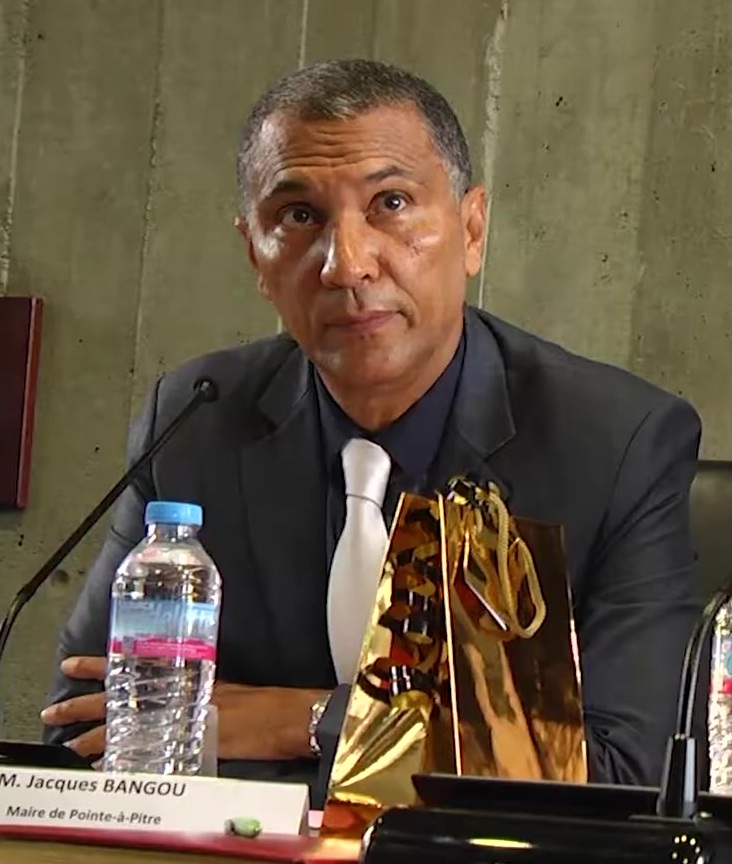
- Jacques Bangou maire (cropped)

Mayor of Pointe-à-Pitre
- In office 2008–2019
- Preceded by: Henri Bangou
- Succeeded by: Josiane Gatibelza

Personal details
- Born: October 27, 1950 (age 76) Pointe-à-Pitre, Guadeloupe, France
- Occupation: Politician

Jacques Bangou (born October 27, 1950) is a Guadeloupean politician.

He was the mayor of Pointe-à-Pitre (2008 to 2019), Guadeloupe's main city.

== 2009 Guadeloupe Riots ==
Bangou was mayor in February 2009, when riots engulfed Pointe-à-Pitre during the 2009 French Caribbean general strikes on Guadeloupe.

He was a leading critic of the French government's response to the crisis. He condemned French President Nicolas Sarkozy at one point during the strike and riots saying, "I call on the president to come out of his ivory tower, and finally tell us if France still cares about Guadeloupe."

== Removal procedure ==
The Prefect of Guadeloupe, Philippe Gustin, initiated a removal procedure against Jacques Bangou on 13 May 2019 due to a municipal deficit of €78 million identified by the Regional Chamber of Accounts (CRC). On 20 July 2019, Jacques Bangou announced that he had sent his resignation letter as mayor to the Prefect but stated his intention to remain a municipal councillor. Josiane Gatibelza, who had been first deputy, was elected mayor by the municipal council on 30 July.
