= Liyannaj Kont Pwofitasyon =

Guadeloupean group of trade unions and social movements

Liyannaj Kont Pwofitasyon, or LKP, is an umbrella group of approximately fifty trade unions and social movements in Guadeloupe. It spearheaded the general strike beginning in January 2009.

== Name ==
The name of the umbrella group comes from the local Antillean Creole language. The Liyannaj Kont Pwofitasyon (LKP) is translated to "Collective Against Extreme Exploitation" in English or the "Collectif contre l'exploitation outrancière" in French.

== Constituents of LKP ==
- ADIM
- AFOC
- AGPIHM
- AKIYO
- AN BOUT AY
- ANG
- ANKA
- ASSE
- ANBT
- Association Liberté Egalité Justice
- CFTC
- CGTG
- CNL
- Combat Ouvrier
- Comité de l'Eau
- Convention pour une Guadeloupe Nouvelle
- COPAGUA
- CSFG
- CTU
- Espérance Environnement
- FAEN SNCL
- Force Ouvrière
- FSU
- GIE SBT
- KAMODJAKA
- KAP GWADLOUP
- Les Verts
- MADICE
- Mas Ka Klé
- Mouvman NONM
- PCG
- SGEP/SNEC
- SOS B/Terre ENVIRONNEMENT
- SPEG
- SUD PTT GWA
- SUNICAG
- SYMPA CFDT
- Travayè é Péyizan
- UDCLCV
- UIR CFTDT
- UNSA
- UGTG
- UPG
- UPLG
- UMPG
- Voukoum
- SNUIPP
- ADEIC
