= Citerne (volcano) =

Volcano in Guadeloupe

Coordinates: 16.0334°N 61.6570°W

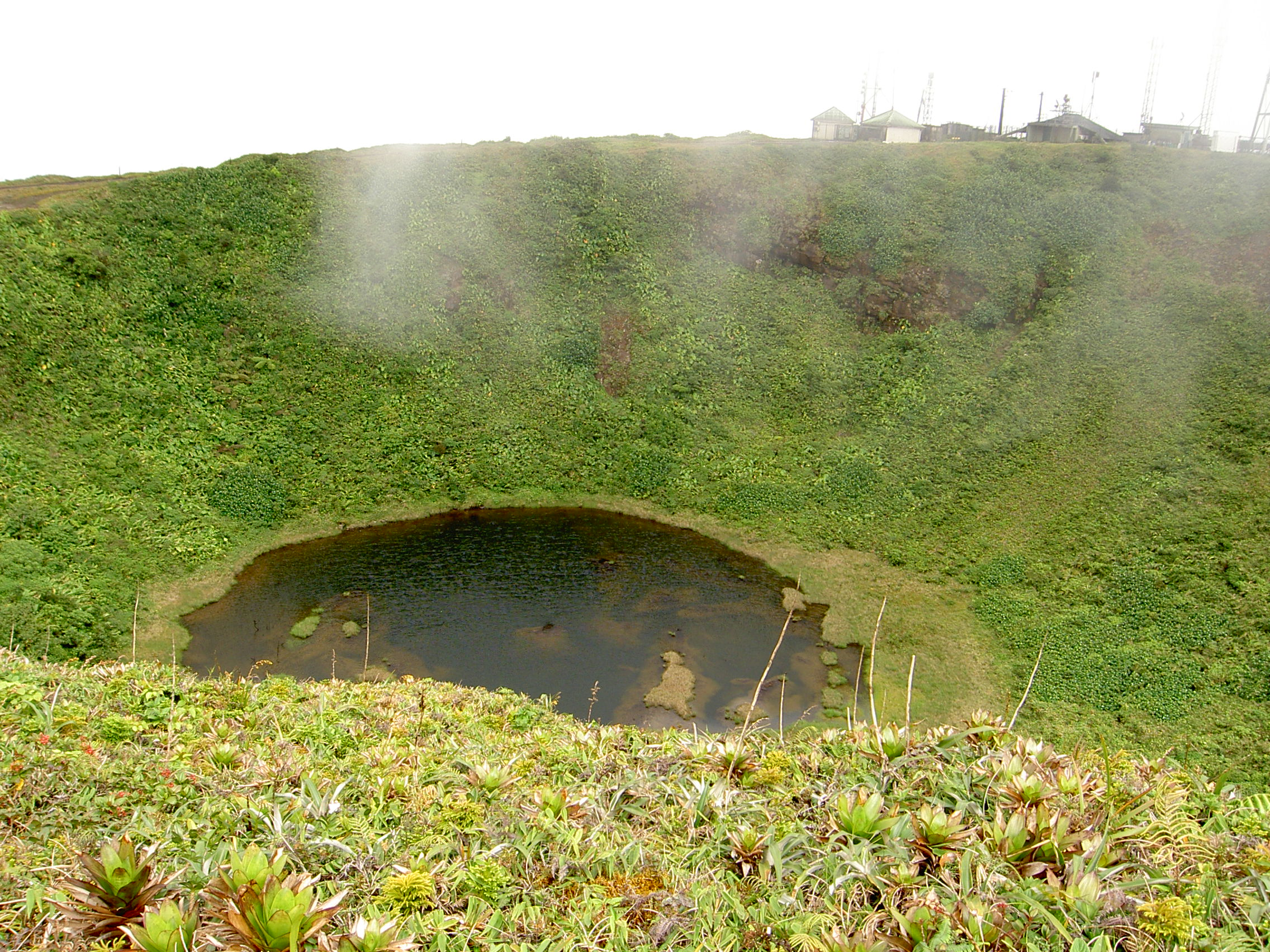
- View of the summit of Citerne with its crater lake.

Highest point
- Elevation: 1155

Geography
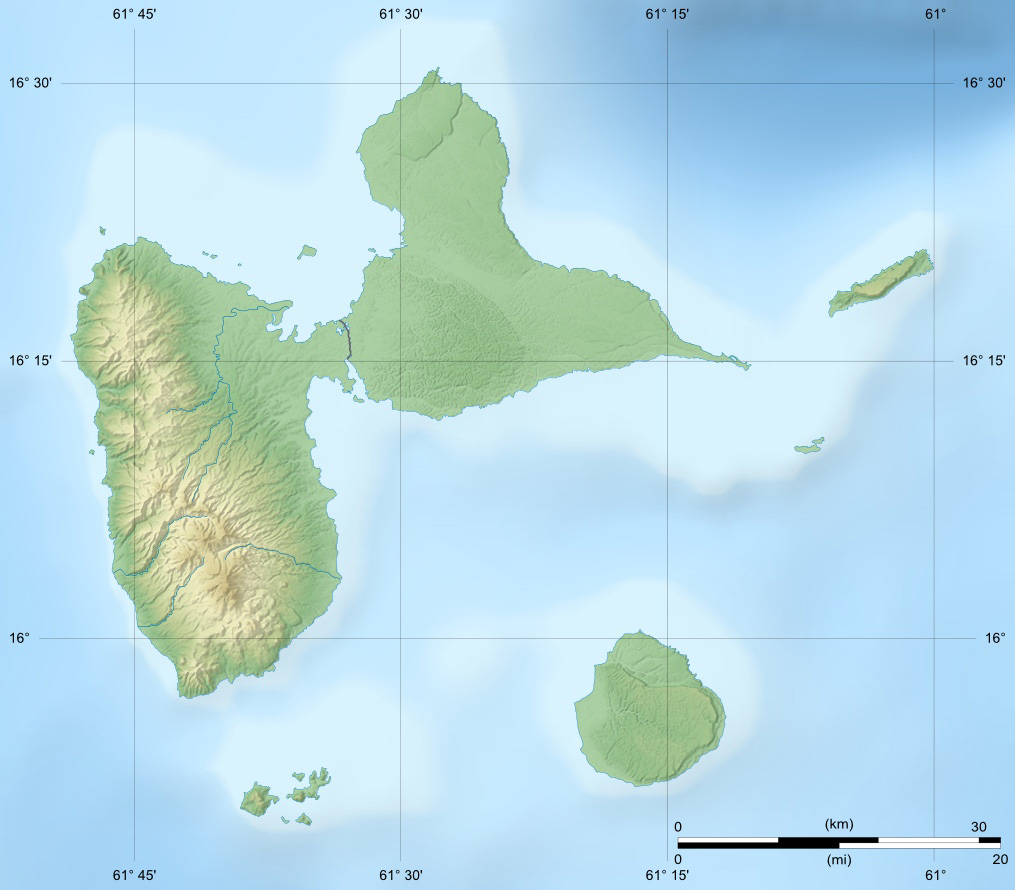
- Location within Guadeloupe
- Location: Gourbeyre, Guadeloupe, France
- Parent range: Basse-Terre

Geology
- Mountain type: dormant volcano
- Last eruption: 370

Citerne is a French volcano located in Guadeloupe, on the southeast flank of La Grande Soufrière.

It has a total height of 1,155 metres (3,789 ft) and is crowned by a circular crater containing Lac Flammarion. On the south edge of the crater there are radio and TV relay antennae. Citerne is located at the intersection of the communes of Gourbeyre (west), Capesterre-Belle-Eau (east) and Trois-Rivières (south); the three communes meet in Lac Flammarion, meaning that the mountain's summit is located within Gourbeyre. The entire mountain is within the Guadeloupe National Park. The summit is accessible from the north by the D11 (the final section of the route is closed to traffic), from the west by the Armistice trail, or from the south by another track.

The last eruption of Citerne occurred around 370.
