= Guadeloupe National Park =

French national park in Guadeloupe

- IUCN category II (national park)
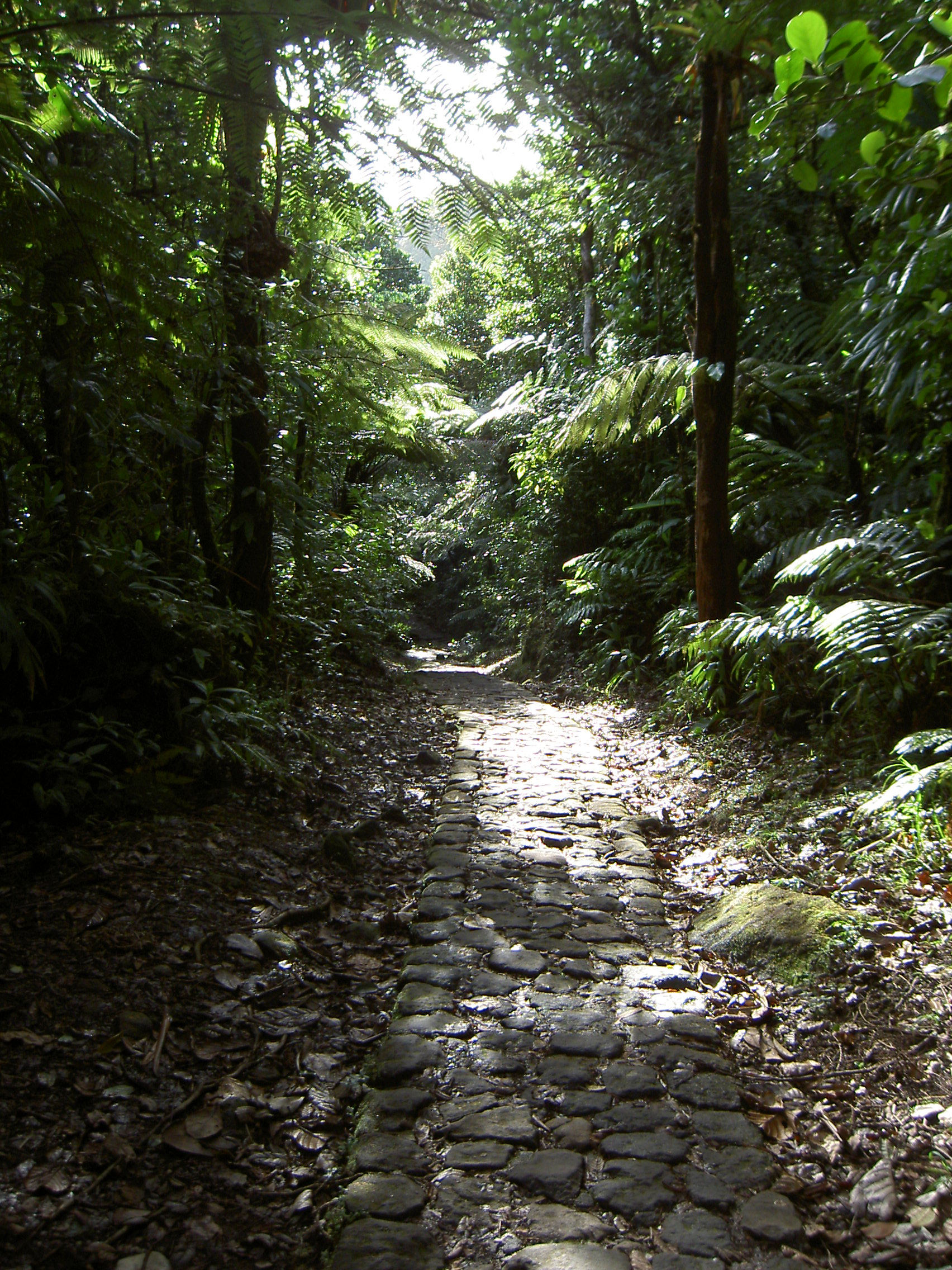

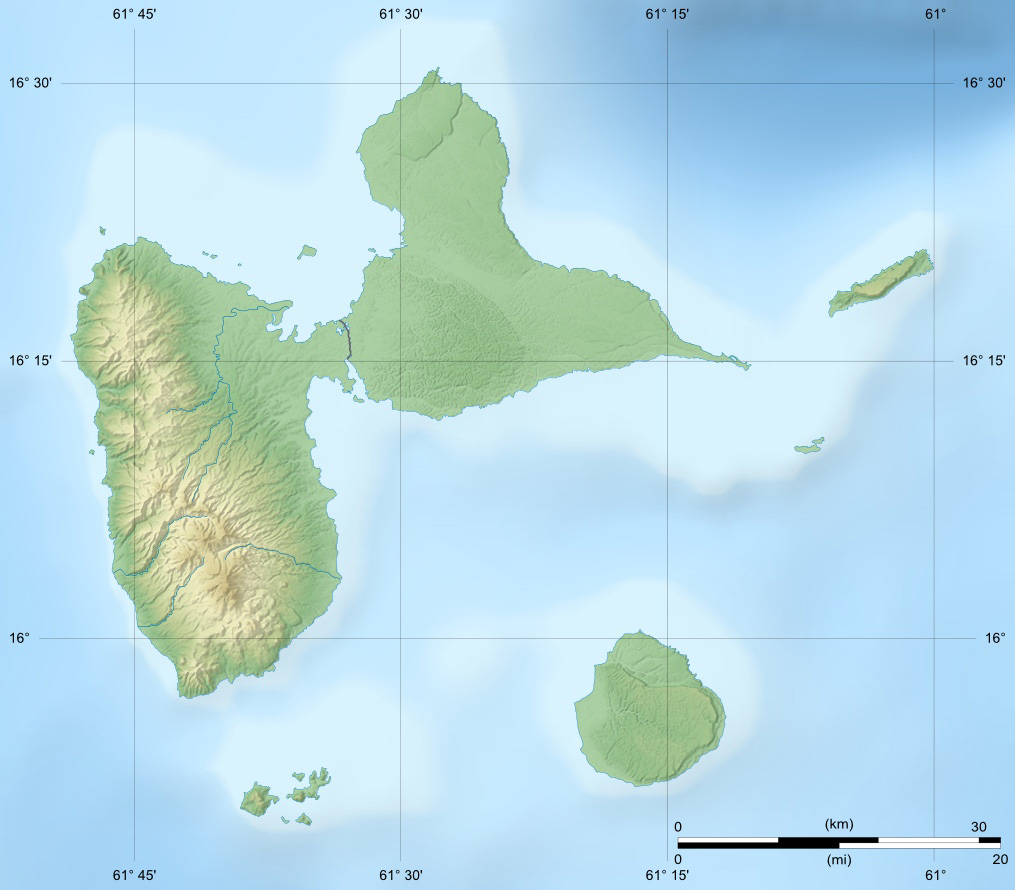
- Location within Guadeloupe
- Location: Basse-Terre Island, Guadeloupe (France)
- Coordinates: 16°5′0″N 61°41′0″W
- Area: 173.0 km^{2} (66.8 sq mi) (core area); 162.0 km^{2} (62.5 sq mi) (buffer zone); 37.0 km^{2} (14.3 sq mi) (marine reserve)
- Established: 1989
- Governing body: Parcs nationaux de France

Guadeloupe National Park (French: Parc national de la Guadeloupe) is a national park in Guadeloupe, an overseas department of France located in the Leeward Islands of the eastern Caribbean region. The Grand Cul-de-Sac Marin Nature Reserve (French: Réserve Naturelle du Grand Cul-de-Sac Marin) is a marine protected area adjacent to the park and administered in conjunction with it. Together, these protected areas comprise the Guadeloupe Archipelago (French: l'Archipel de la Guadeloupe) biosphere reserve.

== History ==
The General Council of Guadeloupe created the Guadeloupe Natural Park in 1970 to recognise the exceptional biodiversity of Basse-Terre's tropical forest and mountain massif. Although it was initially placed under the management of the National Forests Office, proposals emerged in 1977 to establish a national park, in order to improve management and control of the park lands. These proposals came to fruition on 20 February 1989 with the official establishment of Guadeloupe National Park.

The Grand Cul-de-Sac Marin Nature Reserve was established in 1987, and subsequently placed under the management of the park.

In 1992, Guadeloupe National Park achieved international recognition when the core area of the park and the Grand Cul-de-Sac Marin Nature Reserve were designated as an international biosphere reserve by UNESCO.

For most of its history, it was the only French national park outside of metropolitan France. However, it lost that distinction with the 2007 creation of Réunion National Park (Réunion) and Guiana Amazonian Park (French Guiana).

== Geography ==
The boundaries of the national park encompass a core area of 173 square kilometres (43,000 acres), and a buffer zone of 162 square kilometres (40,000 acres). The Grand Cul-de-Sac Marin Nature Reserve comprises 21 square kilometres (5,200 acres) marine, and 16 square kilometres (4,000 acres) terrestrial.

The core area encompasses 10% of the total territory of Guadeloupe, two-thirds of Basse-Terre's tropical forest, and covers a range of elevations from approximately 250 metres (820 ft) to the summit of the mountain massif at 1,467 metres (4,813 ft). The highest point in the park is the summit of La Soufrière, an active volcano. Other notable peaks include: Échelle (1,397 m (4,583 ft)), Grand-Sans-Toucher (1,354 m (4,442 ft)), and the twin side-by-side summits of the Mamelles (768 m (2,520 ft)).

The park comprises parts of 11 communes:

- Vieux-Habitants
- Bouillante
- Pointe-Noire
- Lamentin
- Petit-Bourg
- Goyave
- Capesterre-Belle-Eau
- Trois-Rivières
- Gourbeyre
- Saint-Claude
- Baillif

== Vegetation ==
Guadeloupe National Park may broadly be divided into three ecosystem types:

=== Tropical rainforest ===
The park's tropical rainforest varies in its character and species among several sub-ecosystems, depending heavily on elevation.

- The lower elevations (up to 500 m or 1,600 ft) of the park's buffer zone support a mesophilic forest, featuring trees such as white and red mahogany, rosewood, and jatobá. This ecologic area is also used for agriculture, including banana plantations and other food crops.
- A montane moist forest covers 80% of the core area of the park, at elevations between 300 m (980 ft) and 1,000 m (3,300 ft). This dense and luxuriant ecosystem harbors a great diversity of plant species: very large trees that grow above 30 m (98 ft) (tabonuco, acomat boucan, chestnut); mid-level trees between 6 m (20 ft) and 10 m (33 ft) (bois bandé, oleander); shrubs and herbaceous plants below 10 m (mountain palm, heliconia, ferns); and epiphytic species (giant philodendron, aile-à-mouche, orchids).
- The high-elevation forests above 1,000 m (3,300 ft) are much less dense than the park's other forests, due to the extremely wet conditions and constant cloud cover. These forests resemble savannas.

=== Coastal forest ===
Vegetation in the coastal zone faces the challenges of salinity in the air and soil, intense heat from the sun and its drying effect, and the constant wind. Notable plant species in this environment include seagrape and pear.

=== Mangrove ===
The Grand Cul-de-Sac Marin Nature Reserve includes coastal wetland forests that are flooded either permanently or intermittently by fresh or salt water, comprising nearly half of Guadeloupe's mangrove swamps (37 square kilometres (9,100 acres) of 80 square kilometres (20,000 acres)).

== Wildlife ==
Due to intensive hunting during an earlier period in Guadeloupe's history, animal life in the park is limited in diversity and in populations. Some species, including parrots and parakeets, have been eradicated altogether.

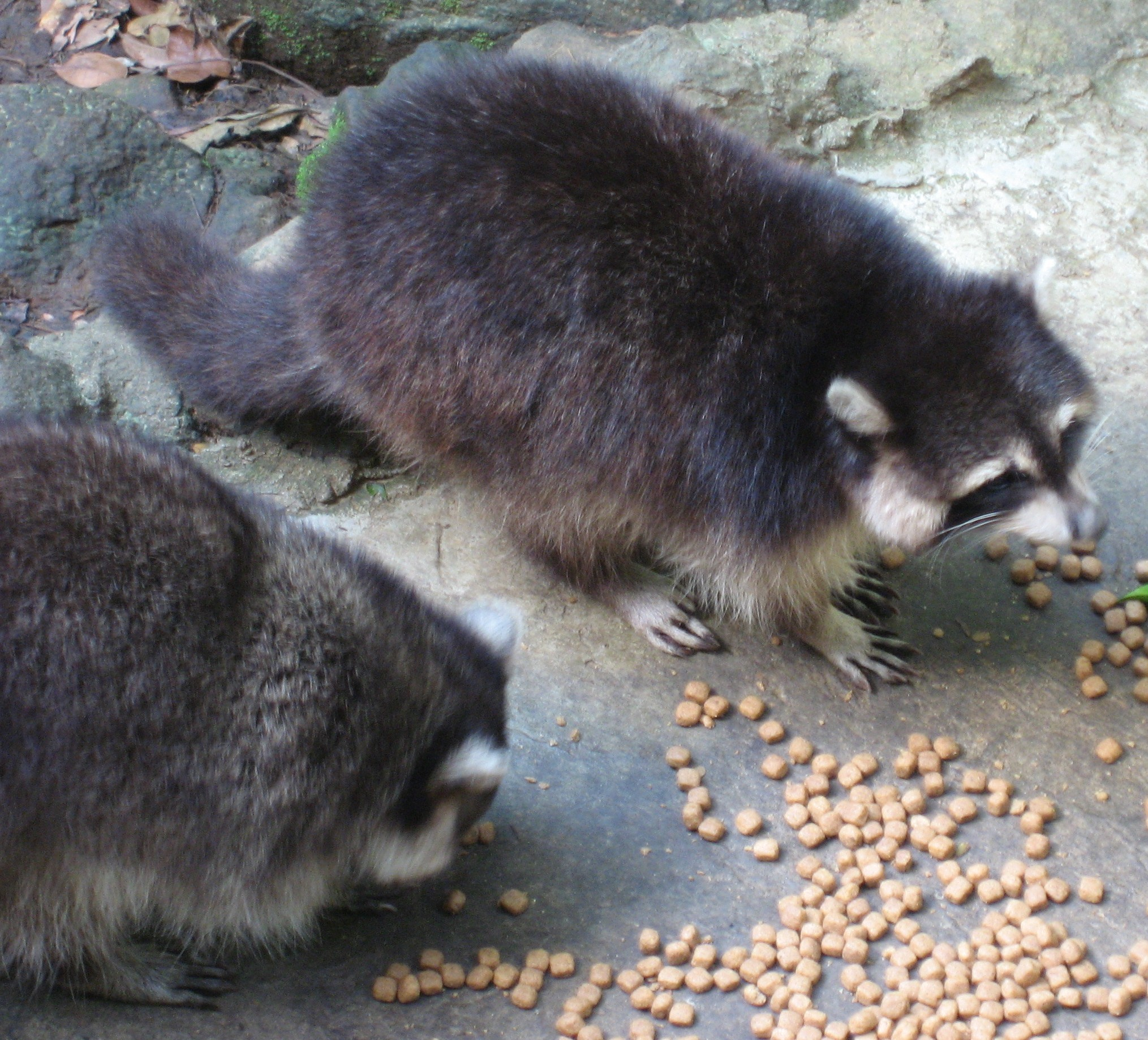
The Guadeloupe raccoon.

=== Mammals ===
The park has 17 mammalian species. The most commonly seen mammals in the park are the Guadeloupe raccoon, bats (two species of which are endemic to Guadeloupe), mongooses (introduced from India), and the endangered agouti. Park authorities plan to reintroduce the manatee, which has been extinct in Guadeloupe for a while.

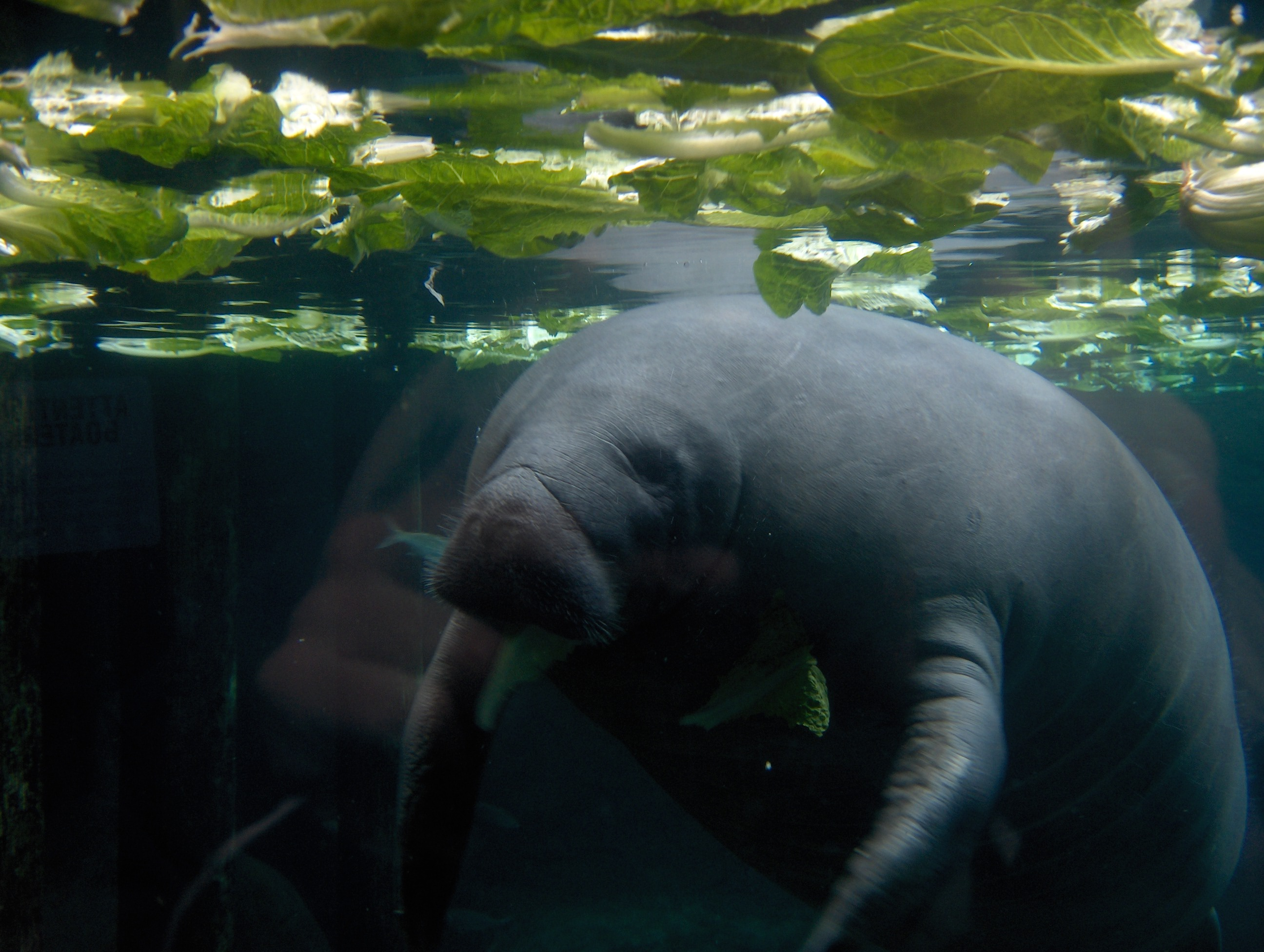
Manatee

=== Birds ===
The park's birds are more numerous than mammals, numbering 33 bird species, and the visitor may encounter hummingbirds, frigatebirds, thrushes, partridges, pigeons, tyrant flycatchers, pelicans, endemic Guadeloupe woodpeckers, and others.

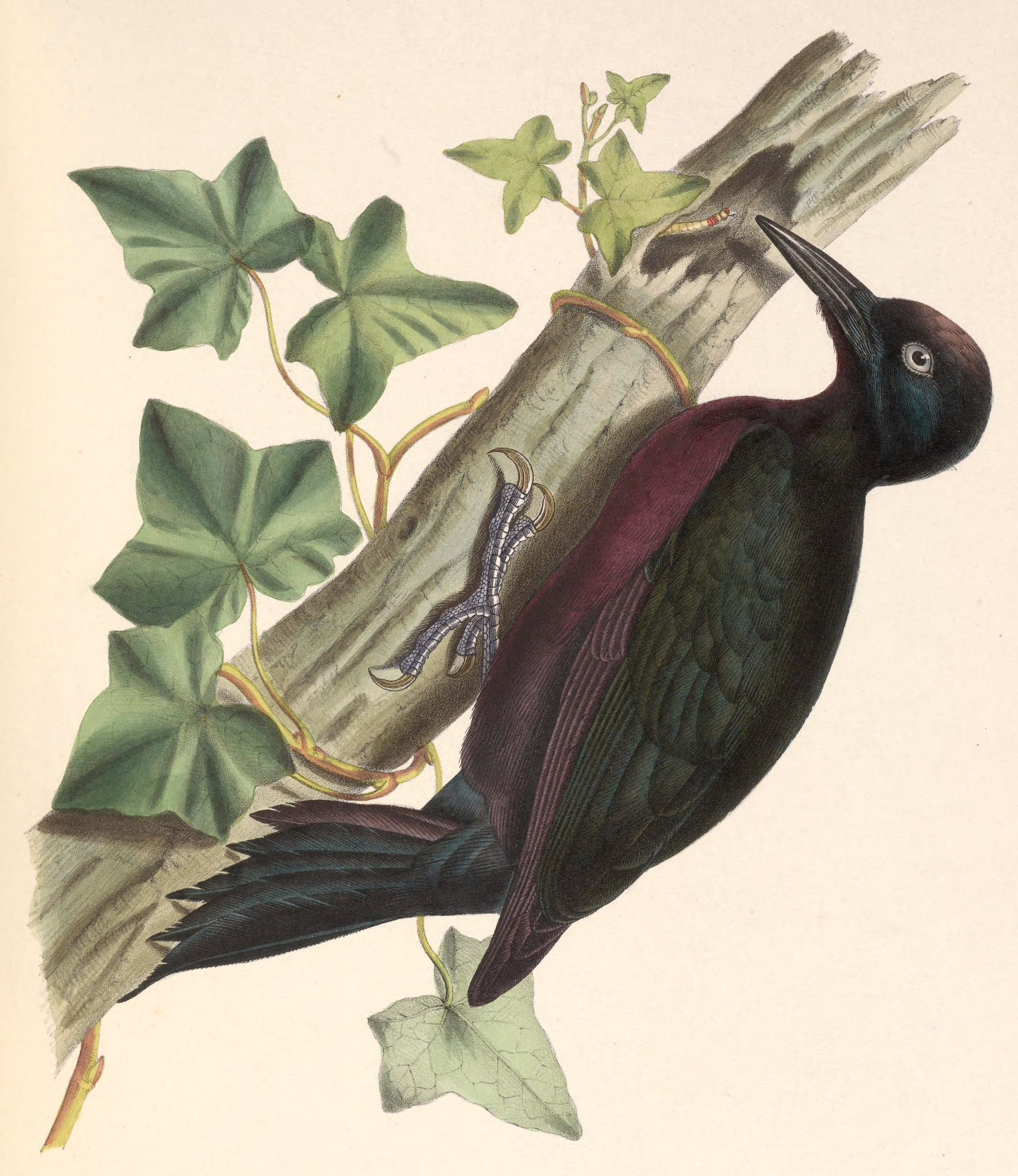
Guadeloupe woodpecker

=== Reptiles ===
- Some sea turtles are found.

=== Fish ===
- Various types of koi fish are visible in the area.

=== Crustaceans ===
- Aquatic and marine life includes big-claw river shrimp and crabs.

=== Insects ===
- Insects are indubitably the most plentiful creatures in the park, their exceptional diversity resulting in a number of surprising forms. Some attain great size, such as Hercules beetles, the duppy bats (black witch moths), and walking sticks.

== Tourist attractions ==
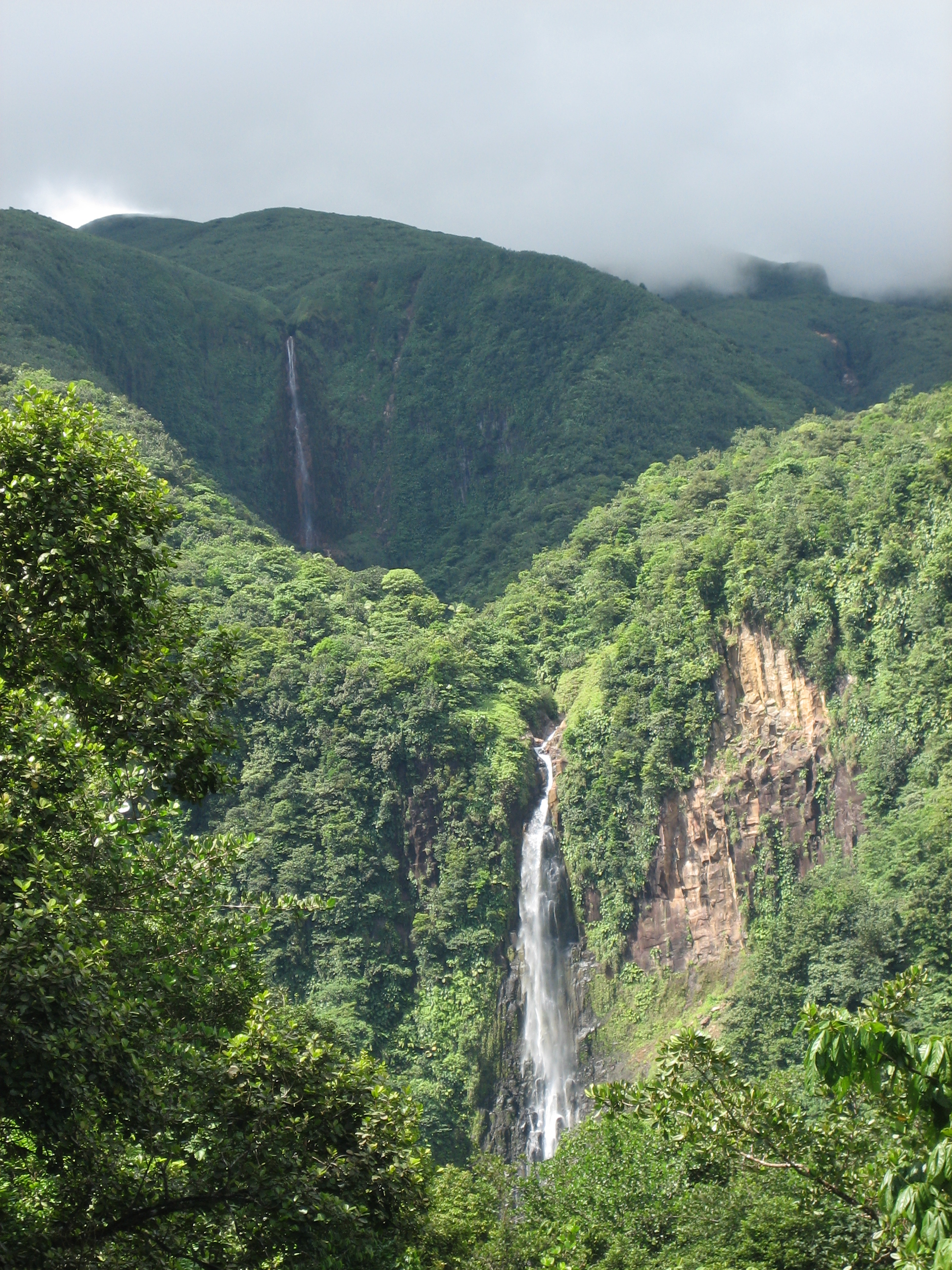
Carbet Falls.

Among the interesting visitor sites in Guadeloupe National Park are:

- La Soufrière
- Carbet Falls
- the two Mamelles and the Traversée road
- Grand Cul-de-Sac Marin Nature Reserve
- numerous hiking trails throughout the park

== See also ==
- National parks of France
- World Network of Biosphere Reserves
- World Network of Biosphere Reserves in Latin America and the Caribbean
