= List of lighthouses in Guadeloupe =

This is a list of lighthouses in Guadeloupe.

== Lighthouses ==
Name	Image	Year built	Coordinates	Class of light	Focal height	NGA number	Admiralty number	Range nml
Anse à la Barque Lighthouse	Image	1886 est.	Basse-Terre; 16°05′21.9″N 61°45′59.2″W	Fl (2) WRG 6s.	11 metres (36 ft)	14892	J5712	white: 8 red: 5 green: 5
Bourg des Saintes Lighthouse		1935 est.	Îles des Saintes; 15°52′06.1″N 61°34′57.2″W	Fl WRG 4s.	8 metres (26 ft)	14904	J5746	white: 10 red: 7 green: 7
Îlet du Gosier Lighthouse		1928	Le Gosier; 16°11′54.2″N 61°29′26.7″W	Fl (2) R 10s.	21 metres (69 ft)	14860	J5734	21
La Désirade Lighthouse		1933 est.	La Désirade; 16°20′00.4″N 61°00′20.1″W	Fl (2) W 10s.	20 metres (66 ft)	14812	J5724	20
Petite Terre Lighthouse		1840	Petite Terre Islands; 16°10′14.4″N 61°06′33.5″W	Fl (3) W 12s.	26 metres (85 ft)	14832	J5730	15
Pointe de la Barque Lighthouse	Image	n/a	Marigot; 16°05′24.4″N 61°46′17.4″W	Q (9) W 15s.	7 metres (23 ft)	14896	J5710	9
Pointe-à-Pitre Range Front Lighthouse	Image	1858 est.	Pointe-à-Pitre; 16°13′11.9″N 61°31′54.2″W	Q W	14 metres (46 ft)	14864	J5736	13
Pointe-à-Pitre Range Rear Lighthouse	Image	1883 est.	Pointe-à-Pitre; 16°13′31.9″N 61°31′57.6″W	Q W	20 metres (66 ft)	14868	J5736.1	--
Pointe du Vieux Fort Lighthouse		1955	Vieux-Fort; 15°56′54.1″N 61°42′27.3″W	Fl (2+1) W 15s.	23 metres (75 ft)	14888	J5704	22
Port-Louis Lighthouse	Image	n/a	Port-Louis; 16°25′05.4″N 61°32′01.1″W	Q (9) W 15s.	10 metres (33 ft)	14836	J5716	11
Port du Moule Lighthouse	Image	n/a	Le Moule; 16°19′56.6″N 61°20′35.9″W	Fl WR 4s.	11 metres (36 ft)	14844	J5722	white: 9 red: 6
Port du Moule East Lighthouse		n/a	Le Moule; 16°19′58.5″N 61°20′24.6″W	Fl (2) WRG 6s.	7 metres (23 ft)	14848	J5723	white: 8 red: 6 green: 6
Saint-Louis Lighthouse	Image	1930 est.	Saint-Louis; 15°57′24.5″N 61°19′08.2″W	Fl G 4s.	9 metres (30 ft)	14912	J5750	9
Trois-Rivières Lighthouse	Image	n/a	Trois-Rivières; 15°58′10.1″N 61°38′47.4″W	Iso WRG	9 metres (30 ft)	14880	J5702	white: 10 red: 7 green: 7

== See also ==
- Lists of lighthouses and lightvessels
