= Vieux-Habitants =

- Commune
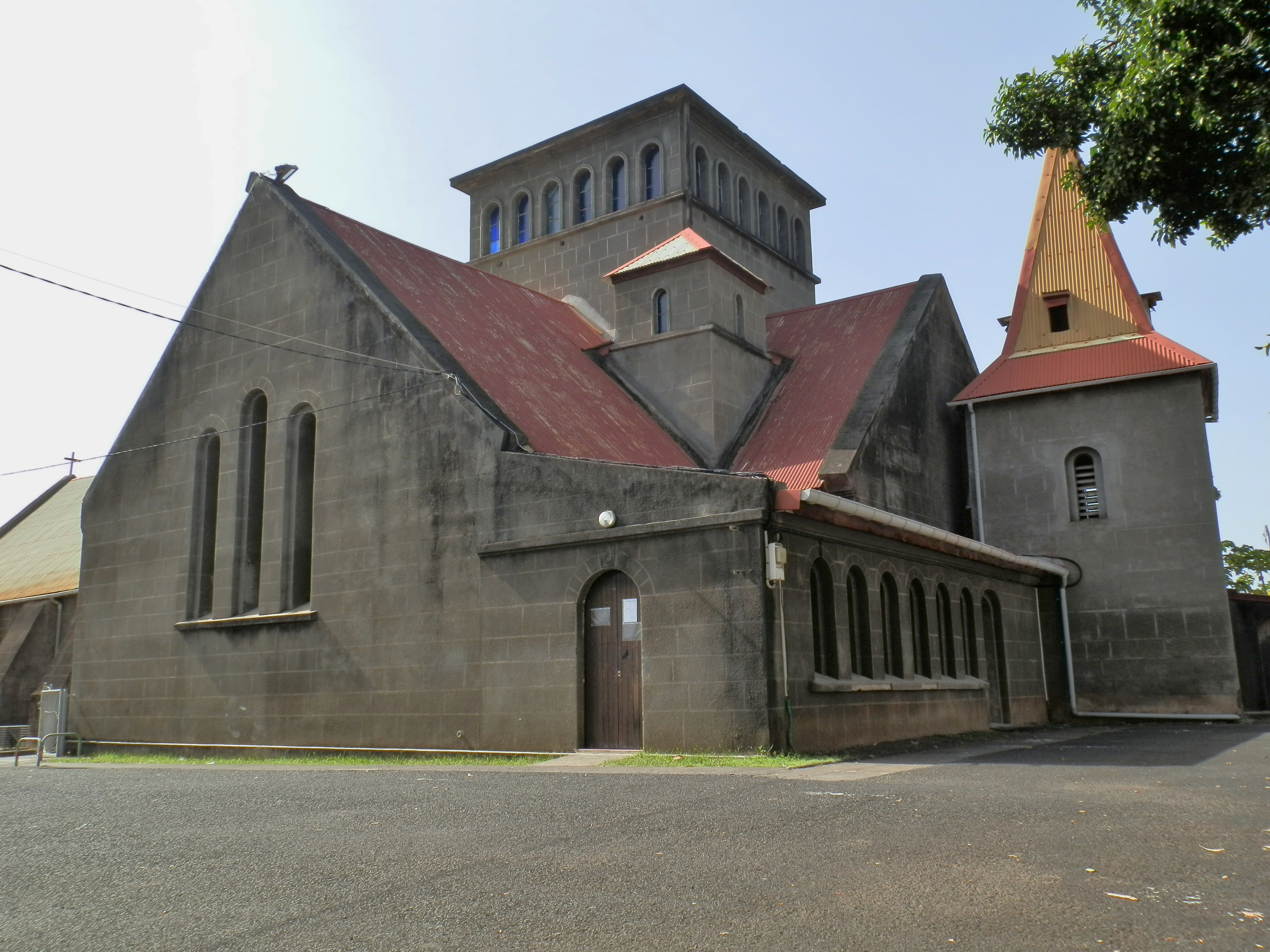
- The Church of Saint-Joseph of Vieux-Habitants, classed as an historic monument

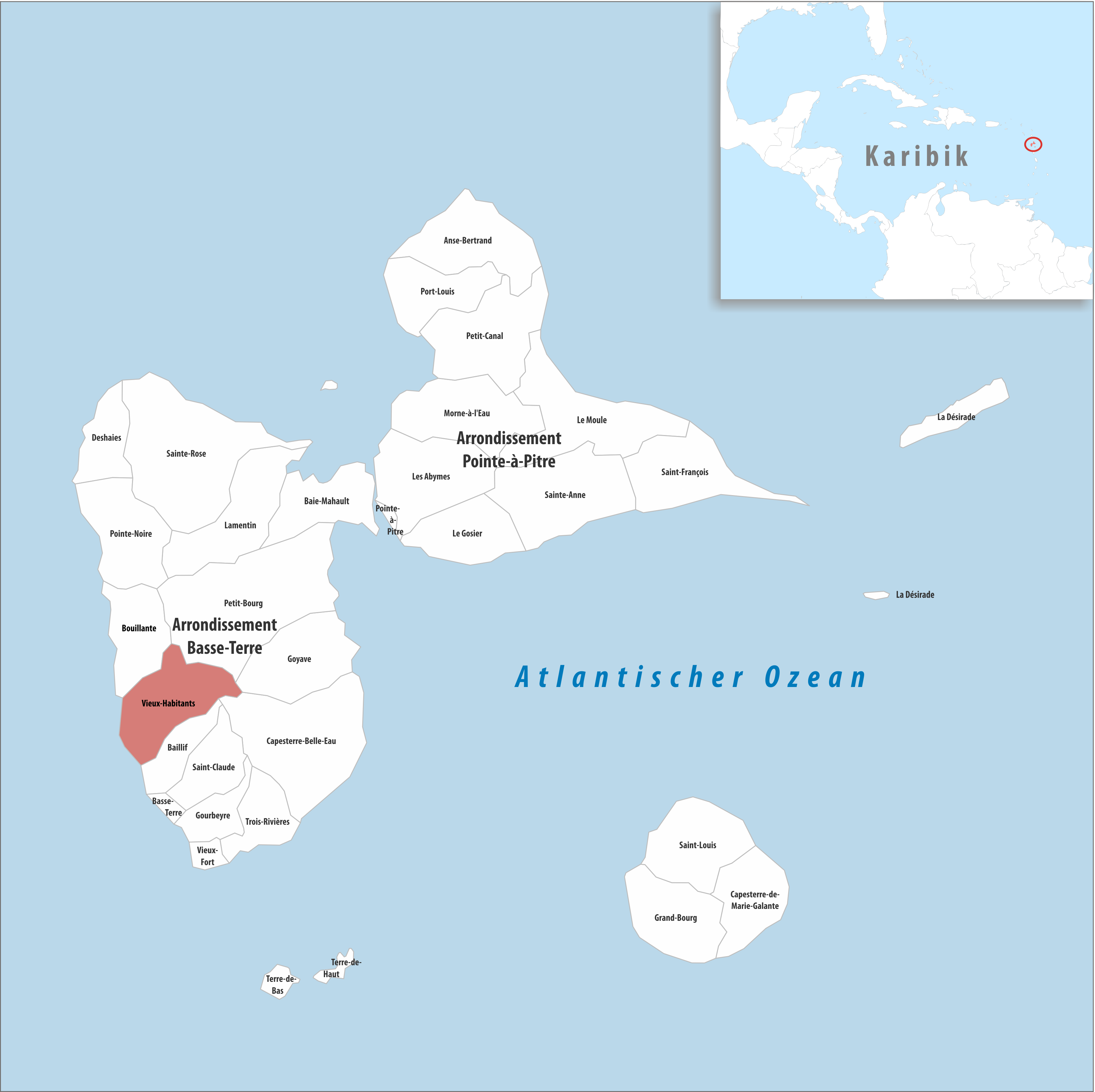
- Location of the commune (in red) within Guadeloupe
- Location of Vieux-Habitants
- Coordinates: 16°03′N 61°45′W
- Country: France
- Overseas region and department: Guadeloupe
- Arrondissement: Basse-Terre
- Canton: Vieux-Habitants
- Intercommunality: CA Grand Sud Caraïbe

Government
  - Mayor (2020–2026): Jules Otto
- Area^{1}: 58.70 km^{2} (22.66 sq mi)
- Elevation: 42 m (138 ft)
- Population (2023): 7,077
  - Density: 120.6/km^{2} (312.3/sq mi)
- Time zone: UTC−04:00 (AST)
- INSEE/Postal code: 97134 /97119
- ^{1} French Land Register data, which excludes lakes, ponds, glaciers > 1 km^{2} (0.386 sq mi or 247 acres) and river estuaries.

Vieux-Habitants (French pronunciation: [vjøz‿abitɑ̃], French for Old Inhabitants; Guadeloupean Creole: Zabitan) is a commune on Guadeloupe, a French overseas department in the Caribbean. It is located on the southwest coast of the island of Basse-Terre.

== History ==
This is the oldest parish, founded in 1636, when the first French settlers inhabited the west coast near the present site of Vieux Habitants. The name, meaning "Old Settlers" derives from the fact that many employees of the West Indies Company retired here and preferred to be called "inhabitants" to distinguish between themselves and the slaves. It grew gradually as an agricultural area, famous for its coffee, vanilla and Creole gardens.

== Geography ==
Vieux-Habitants is located in the southwest of Basse-Terre island, 87 kilometres southwest of Pointe à Pitre. It is bordered by the commune of Baillif to the south and Bouillante to the north. The commune also contains the village of Marigot to the north, between Vieux-Habitants village and Bouilliante. The Grand-Rivières river and forests forms a major part of the local scenery, flowing through the Domaniale forest of Guadeloupe National Park into the sea. Natural landmarks include the Plage de Rocroy beach, the Beaugendre Valley of the Grand-Rivières and L'Etang. There are numerous fresh water pools in the commune.

== Population ==
Historical population
Year	Pop.	±% p.a.
1967	7,680	—
1974	7,391	−0.55%
1982	7,445	+0.09%
1990	7,373	−0.12%
1999	7,611	+0.35%
2007	7,684	+0.12%
2012	7,521	−0.43%
2017	7,210	−0.84%
2023	7,077	−0.31%
Source: INSEE

== Landmarks ==
Notable plantations in the commune include the Domaine de Vanibel, Domaine de Grivelière, and the Le Musée du Café. Eglise Franc-Maçonne was built in the 18th century.

== Sport ==
It is the home of football club JS Vieux-Habitants, who are the reigning champions of the Guadeloupe Division d'Honneur.

== Education ==
Public preschools:

- Ecole maternelle Bourg Vieux-habitants
- Ecole maternelle Géry
- Ecole maternelle Beaujean-Labique Gratienne
- Ecole maternelle Duloir Henriette

Public primary schools:

- Ecole primaire La Cousinière
- Ecole primaire Géry
- Ecole primaire Marigot
- Ecole primaire Bourg Vieux-Habitants

Public junior high schools include:

- Collège Suze Angely

== Notable people ==
- Victorin Lurel, President of the Regional Council of Guadeloupe

== See also ==
- Communes of the Guadeloupe department
