= Lac Flammarion =

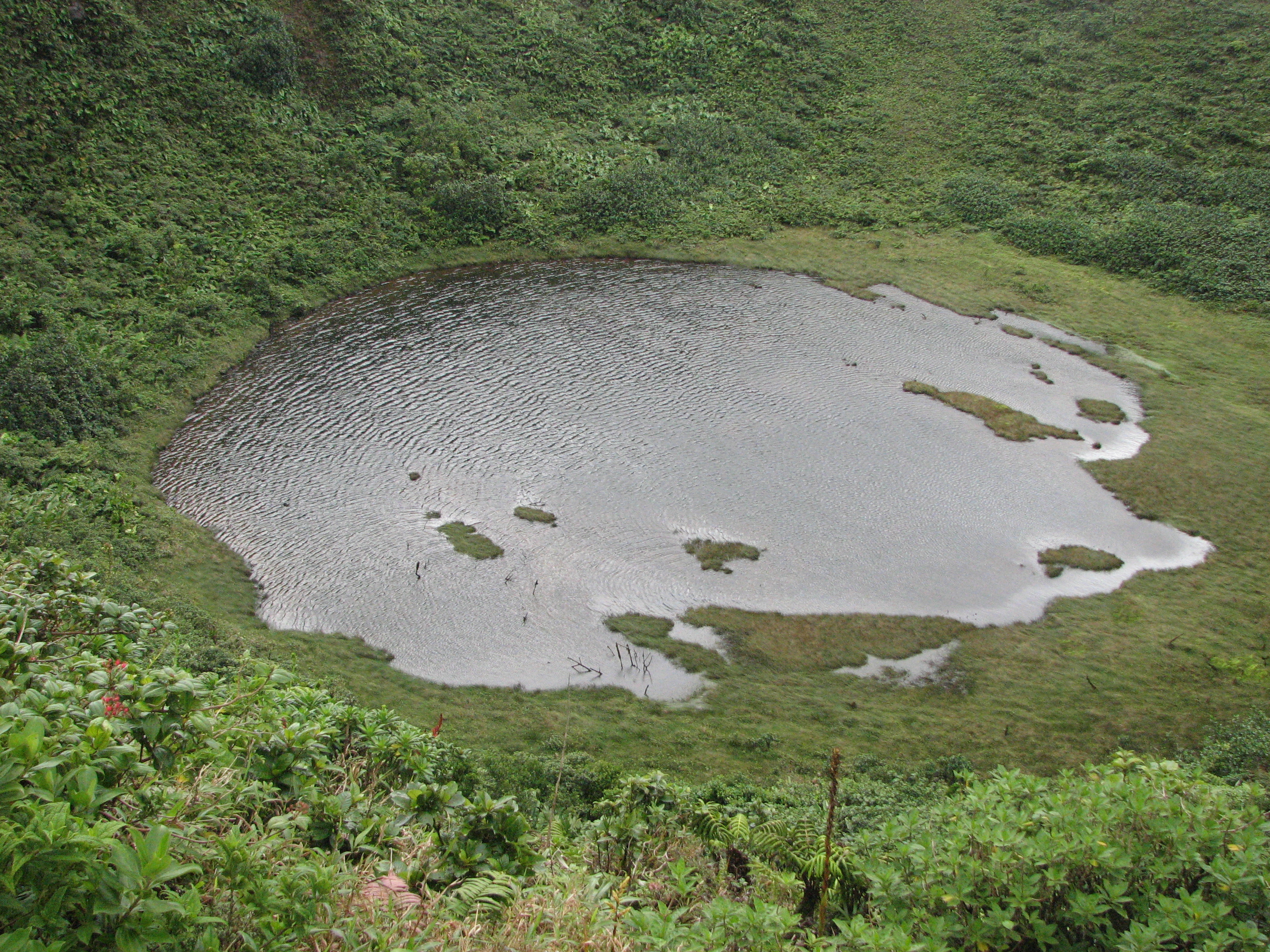
- View of Lac Flammarion in the crater of Citerne.

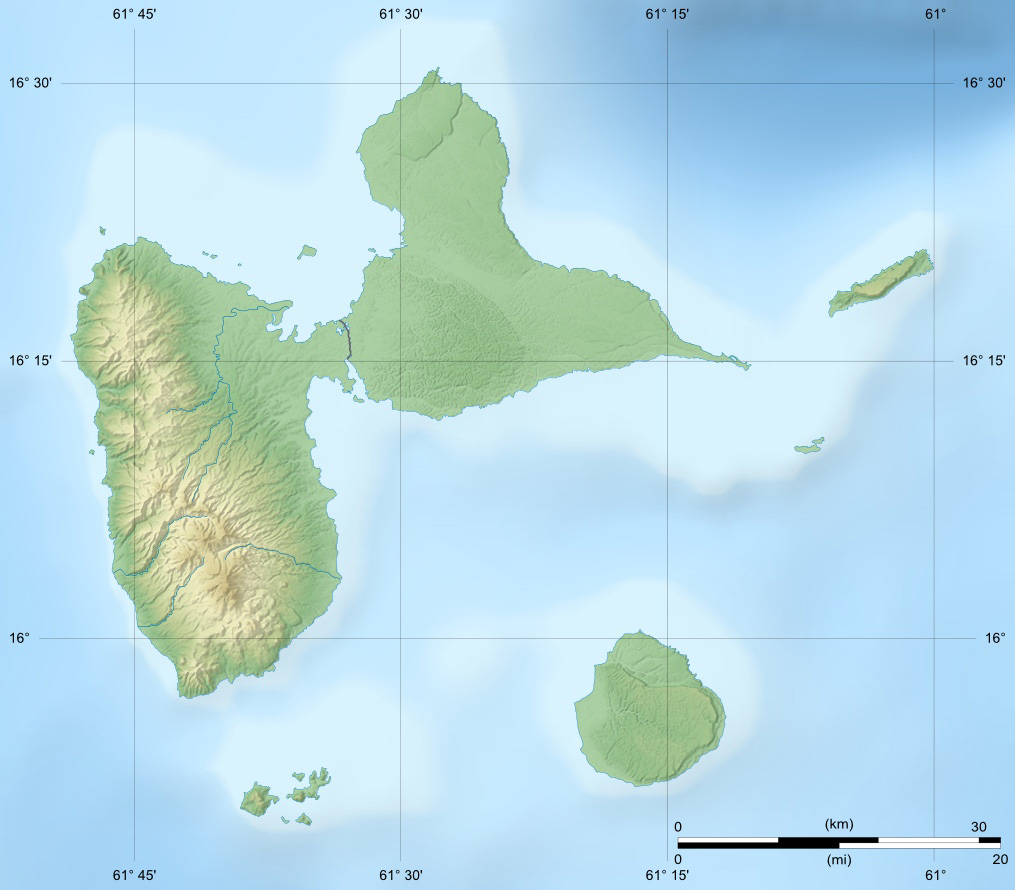
- Location within Guadeloupe
- Coordinates: 16°02′01″N 61°39′21″W
- Type: Volcanic crater lake
- Primary inflows: precipitation
- Primary outflows: None (evaporation and infiltration)
- Basin countries: Guadeloupe, Département d'outre-mer, France
- Max. length: 0.09 km (0.056 mi)
- Max. width: 0.07 km (0.043 mi)
- Surface elevation: 1,103 m (3,619 ft)

Lac Flammarion is a volcanic crater lake in Guadeloupe, which straddles the communes of Gourbeyre and Capesterre. It is situated at an altitude of 1,103 metres (3,619 ft), and measures 90 metres (300 ft) by 70 metres (230 ft).

The lake is entirely filled by rainfall, which is usually about 8,000 millimetres (310 in) per year. The water is acidic with a pH ranging between 4.5 and 5. Its temperature ranges between 18 and 19 °C.

Flammarion is free of vegetation, but rather rare species that prefer the acidic conditions grow on its shores, such as Blechnum l'herminieri, Isachne rigidifolia and Juncus guadeloupensis, an endemic species of rush.

The crater was named by the famous alpinist Mr. Camille Thionville, chef du service de l'Enregistrement et des Domaines.
