= Canton of Trois-Rivières =

Coordinates: 15°58′N 61°41′W

Trois-Rivières
- Canton
- Country: France
- Overseas region and department: Guadeloupe{{{region}}}
- No. of communes: {{{nbcomm}}}

Government
  - Representatives (2021–2028): Jimmy Fausta; Fabienne Thomas
- Area: 74.56 km^{2} (28.79 sq mi)
- Population (2023): 18,732
  - Density: 251.2/km^{2} (650.7/sq mi)
- INSEE code: 971 20

The canton of Trois-Rivières is an administrative division in the department of Guadeloupe, in the Caribbean Its borders were modified at the French canton reorganisation which came into effect in March 2015. Its seat is in Trois-Rivières.

== Composition ==
It consists of the following communes :

- Gourbeyre
- Terre-de-Bas
- Terre-de-Haut
- Trois-Rivières
- Vieux-Fort

== Councillors ==
| Election | Councillors | Party | Occupation |
|---|---|---|---|
| 2015 | Jacques Anselme | PS | |
| 2015 | Nicole Erdan | PS | Councillor of Gourbeyre |
| 2021 | Jimmy Fausta | DVD | Business executive |
| 2021 | Fabienne Thomas | DVD | Councillor of Gourbeyre |

== Pictures of the canton ==
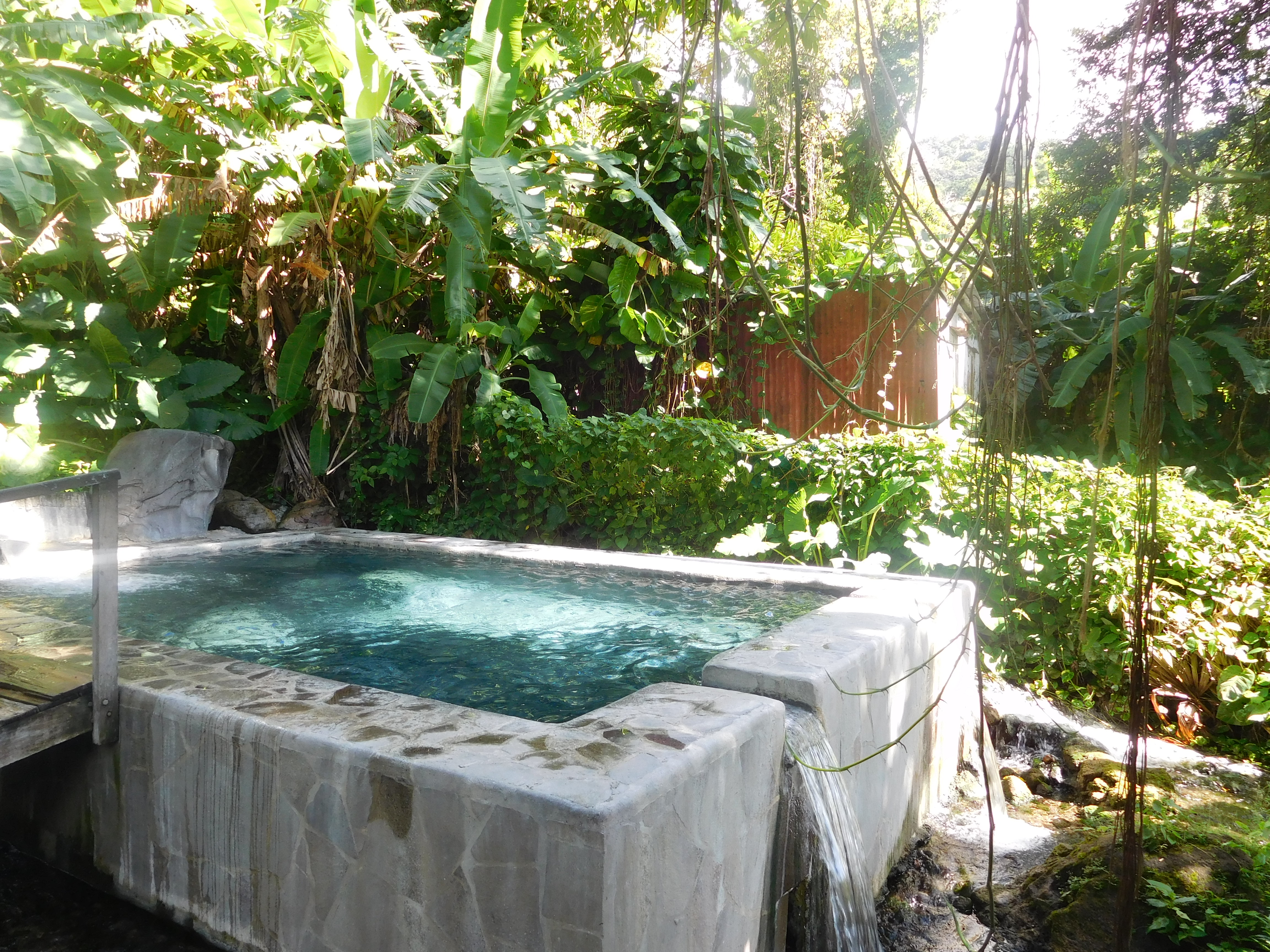
The "Bains de Dolé" in Gourbeyre

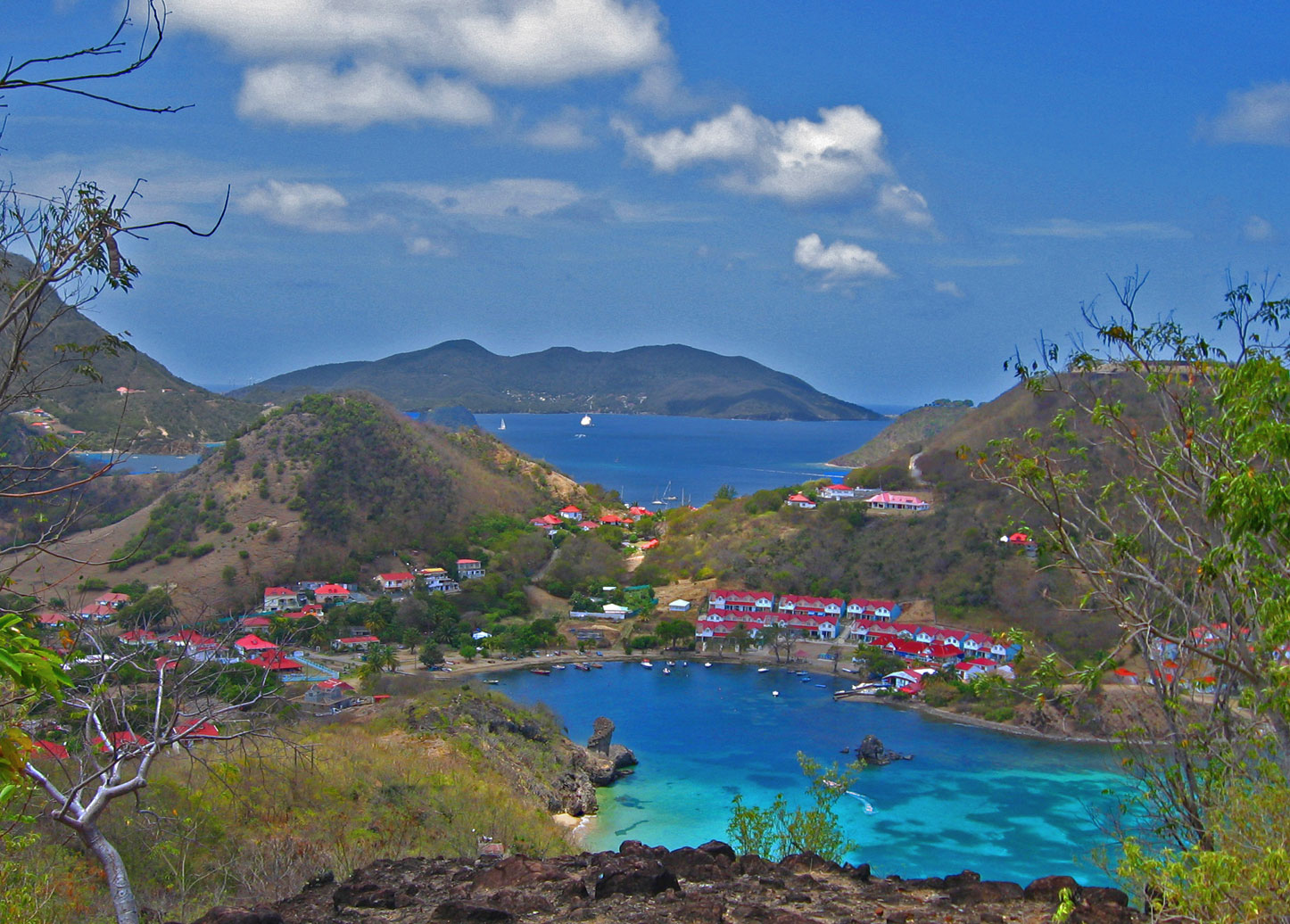
Bay of Îles des Saintes

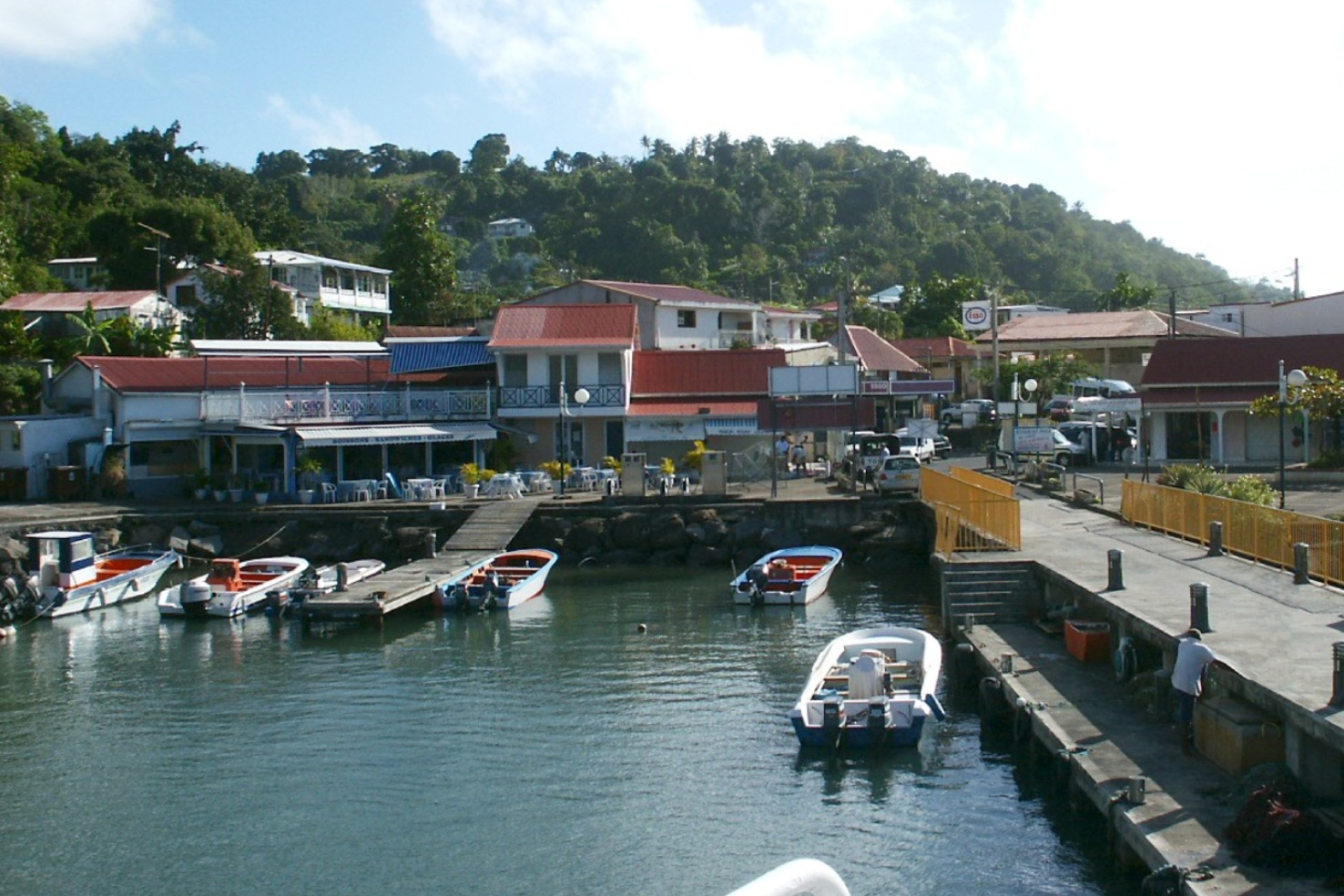
View of Trois-Rivières

== See also ==
- Cantons of Guadeloupe
- Communes of Guadeloupe
- Arrondissements of Guadeloupe
