= Carbet Falls =

Series of waterfalls in Guadeloupe

Coordinates: 16.0456°N 61.6522°W

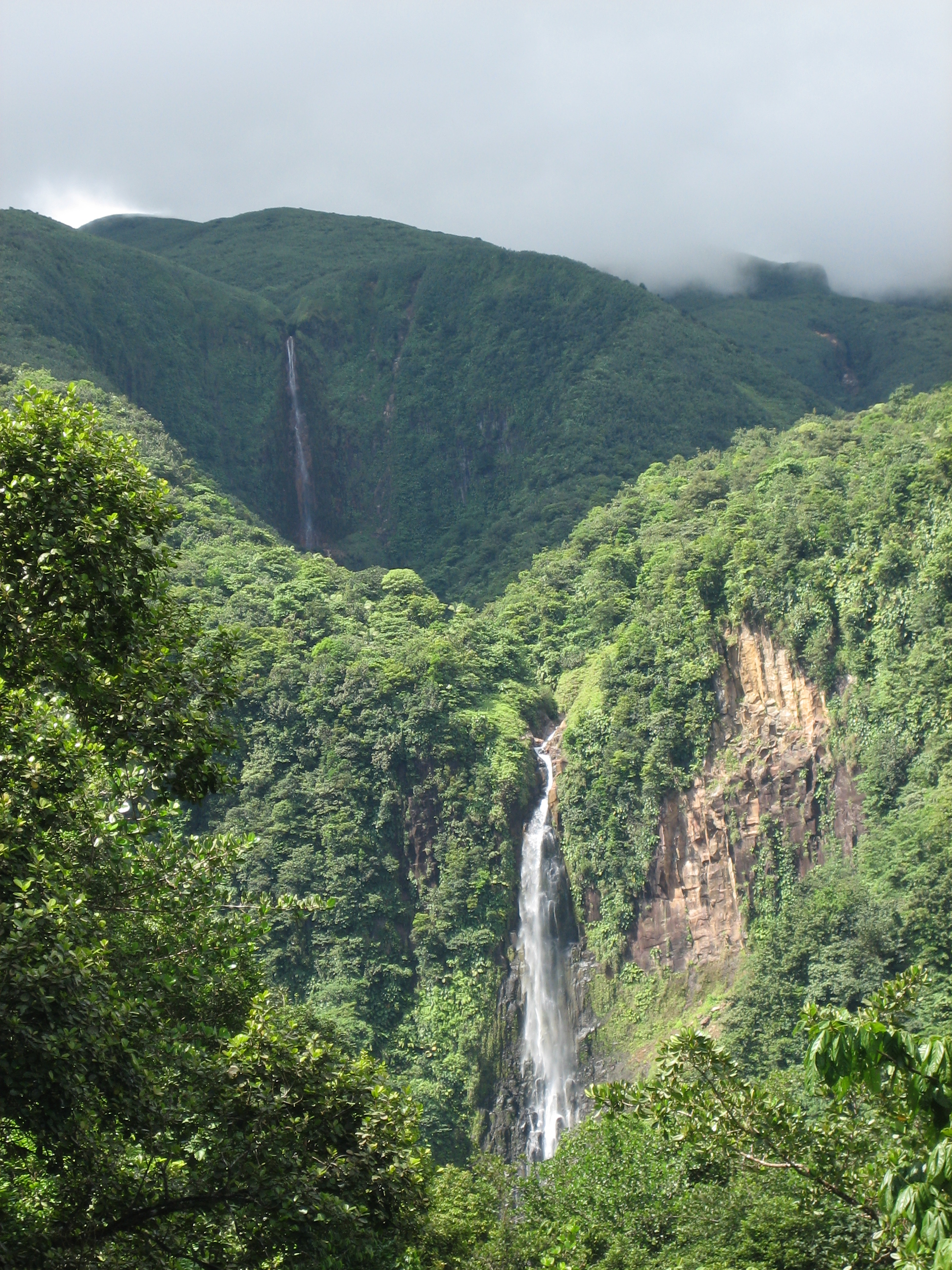
The first and second cascades.

Video showing a tour in the area

Carbet Falls (French: Les chutes du Carbet) is a series of waterfalls on the Carbet River in Guadeloupe, an overseas department of France located in the Leeward Islands of the eastern Caribbean region. Its three cascades are set amid the tropical rainforests on the lower slopes of the volcano La Soufrière. The falls are one of the most popular visitor sites in Guadeloupe, with approximately 400,000 visitors annually.

In 1493, Christopher Columbus noted Carbet Falls in his log.

== Description ==
The falls' first and highest cascade has a drop of more than 115 m (377 ft). Visitors reach the cascade by a long, steep trail at an elevation of 900 m (3,000 ft). The source of the Carbet River is located another 2 km (1.2 mi) upstream from the first cascade, at an elevation of 1,300 m (4,300 ft).

The second cascade receives the most visitors of the three, due to its convenient accessibility. This fall of 110 m (360 ft) is in the white house and can be reached by paved and very well designed path, a 20 minutes from the main parking lot, at an elevation of 660 m (2,200 ft). Many hot springs, including Little Paradise Hot Spring, are located nearby.

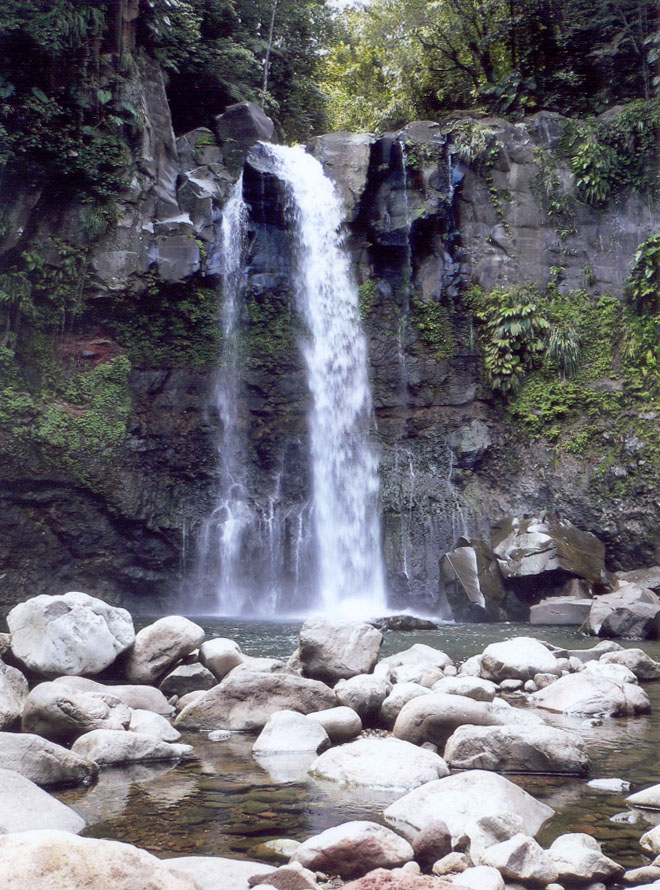
The third cascade.

The third and last cascade measures 20 m (66 ft) in height, and has the greatest water volume of any waterfall in Guadeloupe. It is only accessible on foot, and only to experienced hikers.

== Recent events ==
Following an earthquake in 2004, several cubic meters of rock split from the cliff face behind the second cascade. The safety hazard thus created led park authorities to limit access to the cascade to no closer than a bridge just downstream. Heavy rains in 2005 and 2009 only exacerbated the problem by leaving the terrain more unstable.

== See also ==
- Guadeloupe National Park
- List of waterfalls
