= Canton of Vieux-Habitants =

Coordinates: 16°02′N 61°45′W

Vieux-Habitants
- Canton
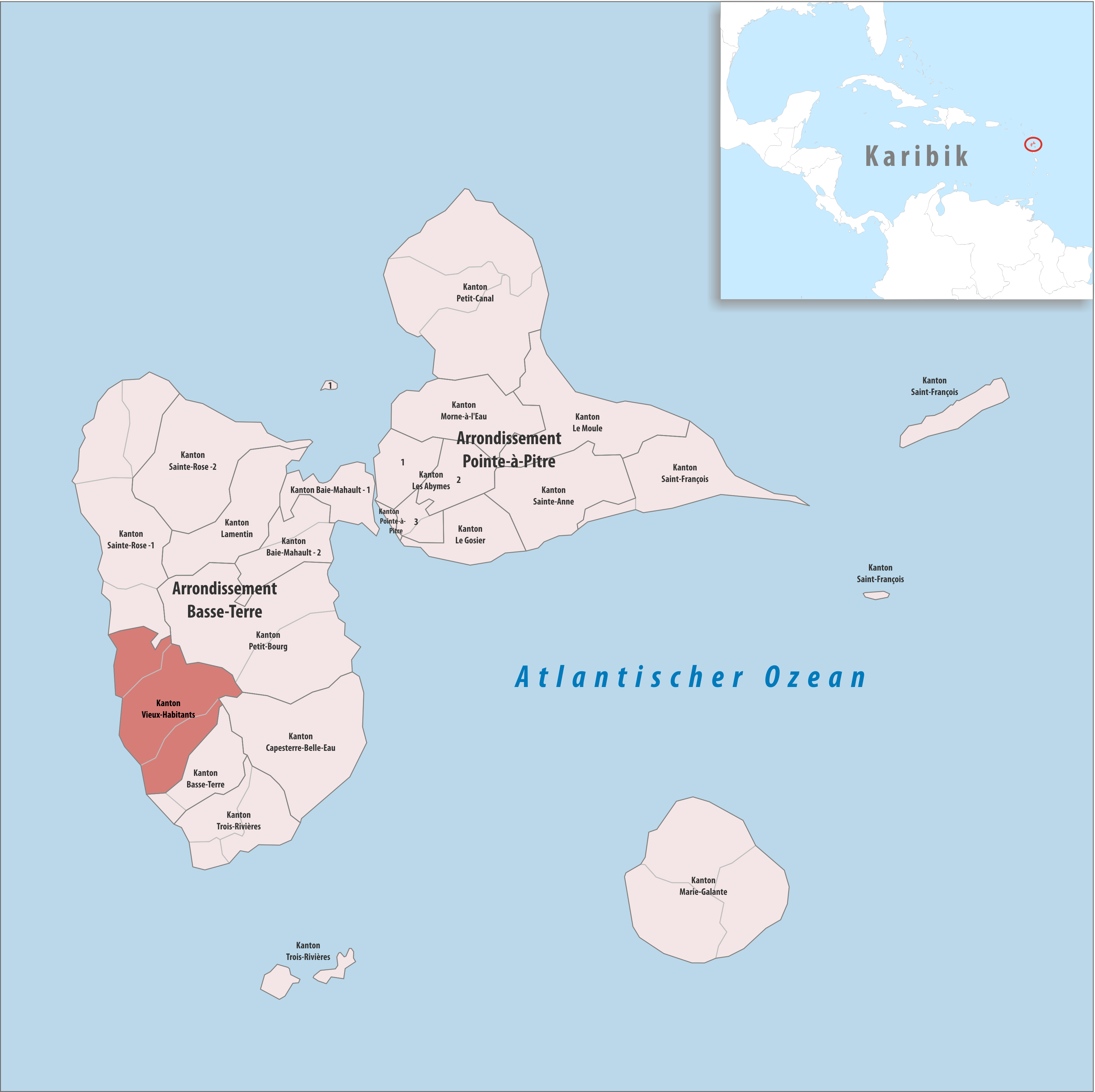
- Country: France
- Overseas region and department: Guadeloupe{{{region}}}
- No. of communes: {{{nbcomm}}}
- Population (2023): 15,885
- INSEE code: 971 21

The Canton of Vieux-Habitants (French for Old Inhabitants) is a canton in the Arrondissement of Basse-Terre on the island of Guadeloupe.

== Municipalities ==
Since the French canton reorganisation which came into effect in March 2015, the communes of the canton are:

- Baillif
- Bouillante (partly)
- Vieux-Habitants

== See also ==
- Cantons of Guadeloupe
- Communes of Guadeloupe
- Arrondissements of Guadeloupe
