= Communauté d'agglomération Grand Sud Caraïbe =

Grand Sud Caraïbe
- Communauté d'agglomération
- Location of Grand Sud Caraïbe within the department
- Coordinates: 16°00′N 61°40′W
- Country: France
- Overseas region and department: Guadeloupe{{{region}}}
- No. of communes: {{{nbcomm}}}
- Established: 2011
- Area: 343.5 km^{2} (132.6 sq mi)
- Population (2019): 77,186
  - Density: 224.7/km^{2} (582.0/sq mi)

Communauté d'agglomération Grand Sud Caraïbe is a communauté d'agglomération, an intercommunal structure in the Guadeloupe overseas department and region of France. Created in 2011, its seat is in Basse-Terre. Its area is 343.5 km^{2}. Its population was 77,186 in 2019.

== Composition ==
The communauté d'agglomération consists of the following 11 communes:

1. Baillif
2. Basse-Terre
3. Bouillante
4. Capesterre-Belle-Eau
5. Gourbeyre
6. Saint-Claude
7. Terre-de-Bas
8. Terre-de-Haut
9. Trois-Rivières
10. Vieux-Fort
11. Vieux-Habitants
