= Vieux-Fort, Guadeloupe =

Vieux-Fort
- Commune
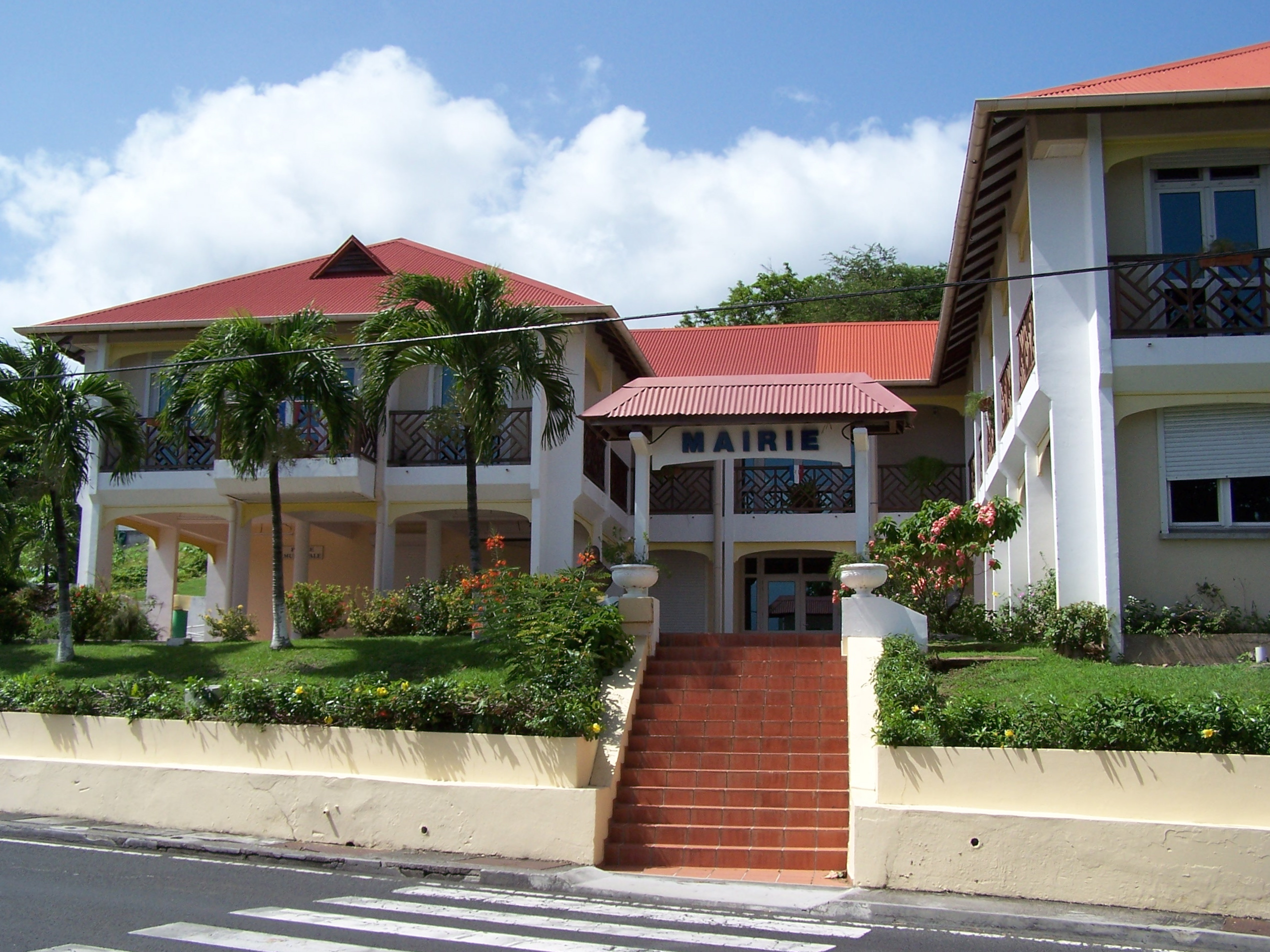
- The Vieux-Fort town hall

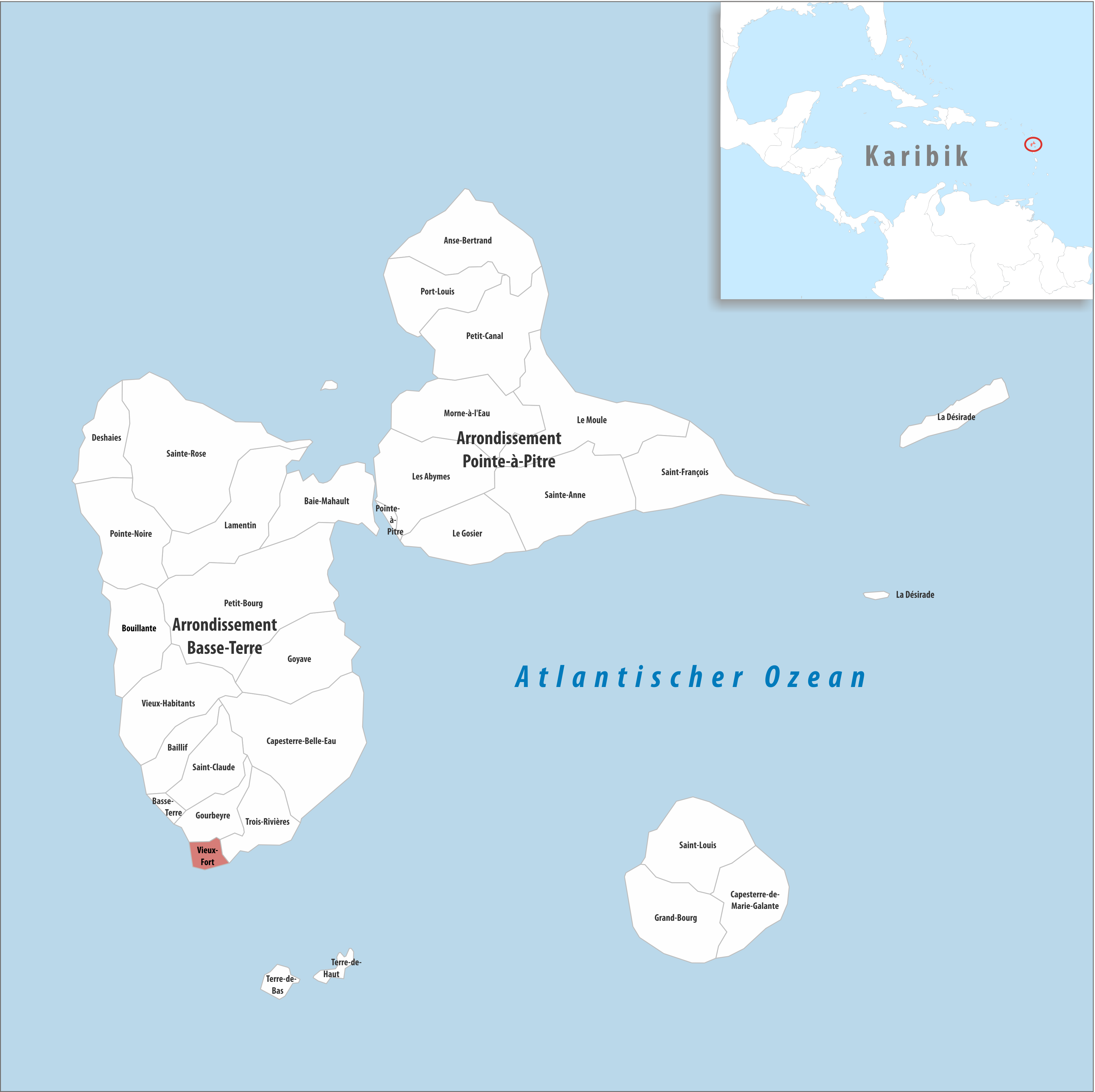
- Location of the commune (in red) within Guadeloupe
- Location of Vieux-Fort
- Coordinates: 15°57′00″N 61°42′00″W
- Country: France
- Overseas region and department: Guadeloupe
- Arrondissement: Basse-Terre
- Canton: Trois-Rivières
- Intercommunality: CA Grand Sud Caraïbe

Government
  - Mayor (2020–2026): Héric André
- Area^{1}: 7.24 km^{2} (2.80 sq mi)
- Elevation: 0 m (0 ft)
- Population (2023): 1,674
  - Density: 231/km^{2} (599/sq mi)
- Demonym(s): Vieux-Fortain, Vieux-Fortaine
- Time zone: UTC−04:00 (AST)
- INSEE/Postal code: 97133 /97141
- ^{1} French Land Register data, which excludes lakes, ponds, glaciers > 1 km^{2} (0.386 sq mi or 247 acres) and river estuaries.

Vieux-Fort (French pronunciation: [vjø fɔʁ]; Guadeloupean Creole: Vyéfò) is a commune in the French overseas department of Guadeloupe. It is located on Basse-Terre Island.

== Education ==
Public primary schools:

- École primaire Auguste Feler

== See also ==
- Communes of the Guadeloupe department
