= Bouillante =

- Commune
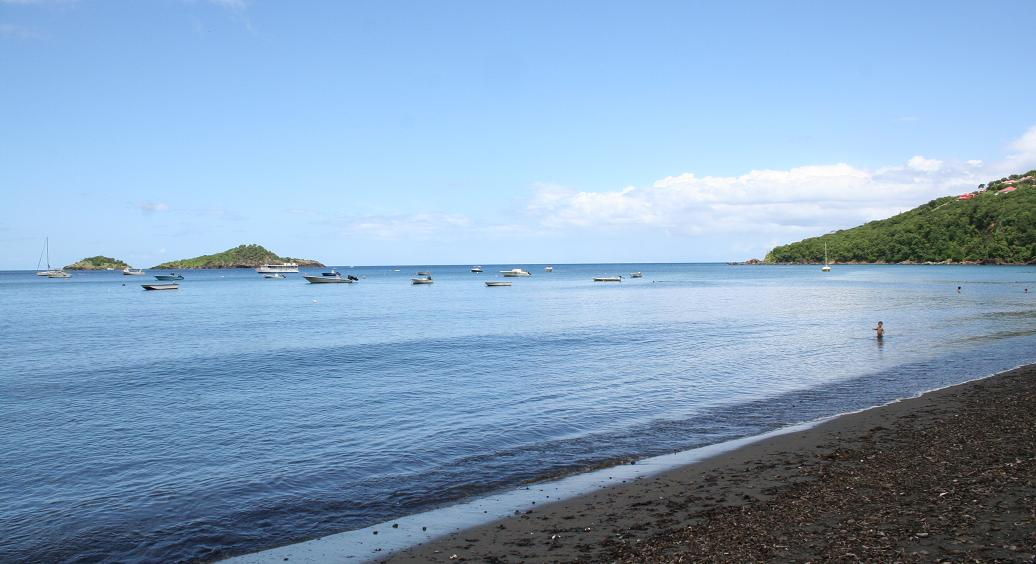
- Malendure Beach and the Pigeon Islets

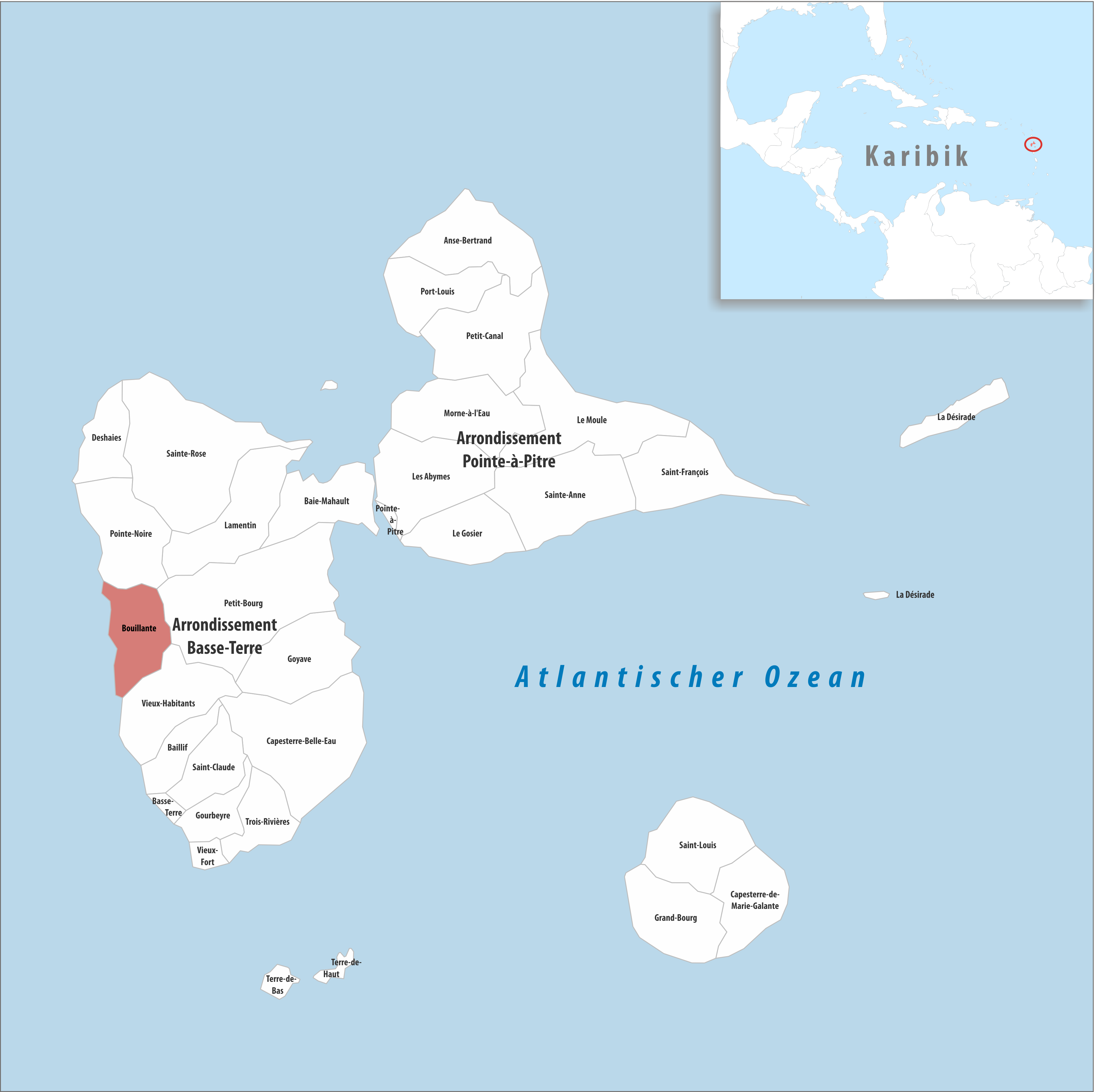
- Location of the commune (in red) within Guadeloupe
- Location of Bouillante
- Location within France
- Coordinates: 16°06′N 61°45′W
- Country: France
- Overseas region and department: Guadeloupe
- Arrondissement: Basse-Terre
- Canton: Sainte-Rose-1 and Vieux-Habitants
- Intercommunality: CA Grand Sud Caraïbe

Government
  - Mayor (2020–2026): Thierry Abelli
- Area^{1}: 43.46 km^{2} (16.78 sq mi)
- Highest elevation: 1,096 m (3,596 ft)
- Lowest elevation: 0 m (0 ft)
- Population (2023): 6,127
  - Density: 141.0/km^{2} (365.1/sq mi)
- Demonym: Bouillantais
- Time zone: UTC−04:00 (AST)
- INSEE/Postal code: 97106 /97125
- ^{1} French Land Register data, which excludes lakes, ponds, glaciers > 1 km^{2} (0.386 sq mi or 247 acres) and river estuaries.

Bouillante (French pronunciation: [bujɑ̃t]; Guadeloupean Creole: Bouyant) is a commune in the French overseas region and department of Guadeloupe, in the Lesser Antilles.

== History ==
Bouillante was founded about 1635 with the arrival of some of Guadeloupe's first colonists. It was originally named Islets à Goyaves ("Islet of Guavas") until the beginning of the 18th century, when the name was changed to Fontaines Bouillantes after the island's hot springs that were known for their therapeutic virtues.

With the end of the Ancien Régime, the civil authorities and religious leaders renamed the city Bouillante. Saint Louis, the religious character, is the patron saint of the commune.

Bouillante knew its apogee during the 17th century. It occupied an important place on the island through the policy of the Kingdom of France. The king wanted to make Guadeloupe a colony of settlement based on the family small-scale farming and the introduction of volunteers. The latter, from France, were regarded as the first European inhabitants of the Caribbean. They learned the rudiments of tropical agriculture, different from their area of origin. The Amerindians were marginalized following the integral report/ratio of the two practical ones and they did not follow all the same route. The two enumerations, that of 1664 and that of 1671, reveal the destiny of the different groups.

After 1960, the commune knew major upheavals with the departure of a great number of young people for the cities.

== Geography ==
Bouillante is located in the middle of the leeward coast, on the western coast of Basse-Terre Island. It lies between the communes of Pointe-Noire to the north, Vieux-Habitants to the south, and Petit-Bourg to the east. To the east, there is a large mountainous chain. Crossing the commune along its north–south axis is the national forest. The high point of this forest is the Piton of Bouillante. The city is 25 km (16 mi) north of Basse-Terre, the administrative capital, and 40 km (25 mi) from Pointe-à-Pitre, the commercial city.

The commune lies on steep volcanic slopes which descend abruptly to the sea. Its fertile volcanic soil allowed the growing of coffee, which was regarded as one of the best coffee in the world. Cotton, banana, and vanilla also greatly contributed to its economic success for many years.

Today, the economy of the commune is centered on tourism. Agriculture, fishing, the craft industry and geothermics still play a large part in the local economy.

Bouillante profits from its many coves and bays dotting the coast, and beaches such as Anse à la Barque, Petite Anse, Anse à sable and Malendure with its famous coral barrier which lodges the prestigious Réserve Cousteau. The beaches are largely open but are sheltered from the sometimes violent winds.

== Population ==
Historical population
Year	Pop.	±% p.a.
1967	6,890	—
1974	6,364	−1.13%
1982	6,649	+0.55%
1990	6,973	+0.60%
1999	7,336	+0.57%
2007	7,536	+0.34%
2012	7,481	−0.15%
2017	7,024	−1.25%
2023	6,127	−2.25%
Source: INSEE

== Education ==
Public preschools include:

- Ecole maternelle Bourg Bouillante
- Ecole maternelle Malendure
- Ecole maternelle Pigeon

Public primary schools include:

- Ecole primaire Bourg de Bouillante
- Ecole primaire Galet-Malendure
- Ecole primaire Pigeon
- Ecole primaire Thomas
- Ecole primaire Village

Public junior high schools include:

- Collège Fontaines Bouillantes

== Twin towns — Sister cities ==
Bouillante is twinned with:

- Marlenheim (France)

== See also ==
- Communes of the Guadeloupe department
