= Baillif =

Commune of Guadeloupe

- Commune
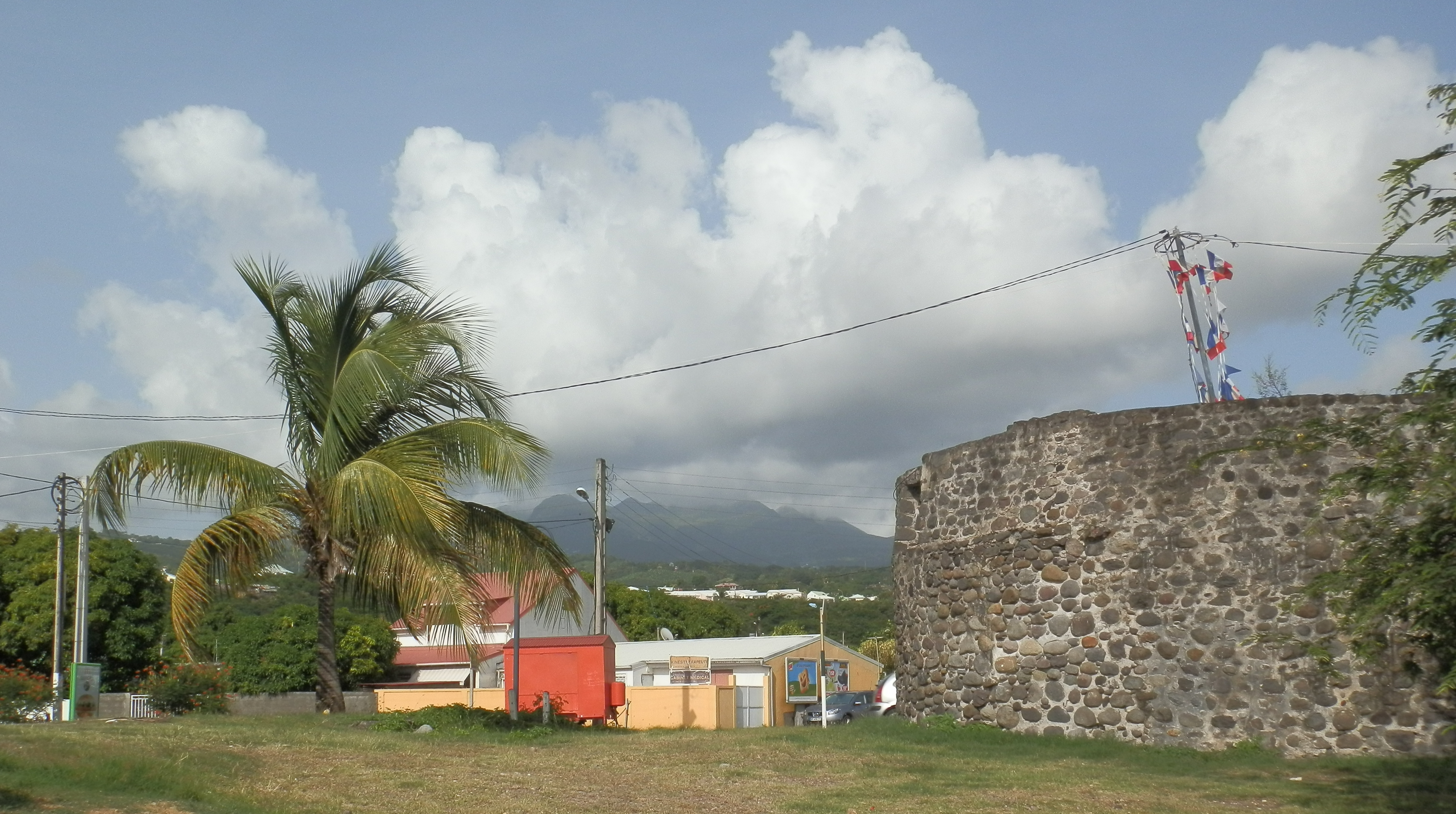
- The tower of Father Labat, a historic monument

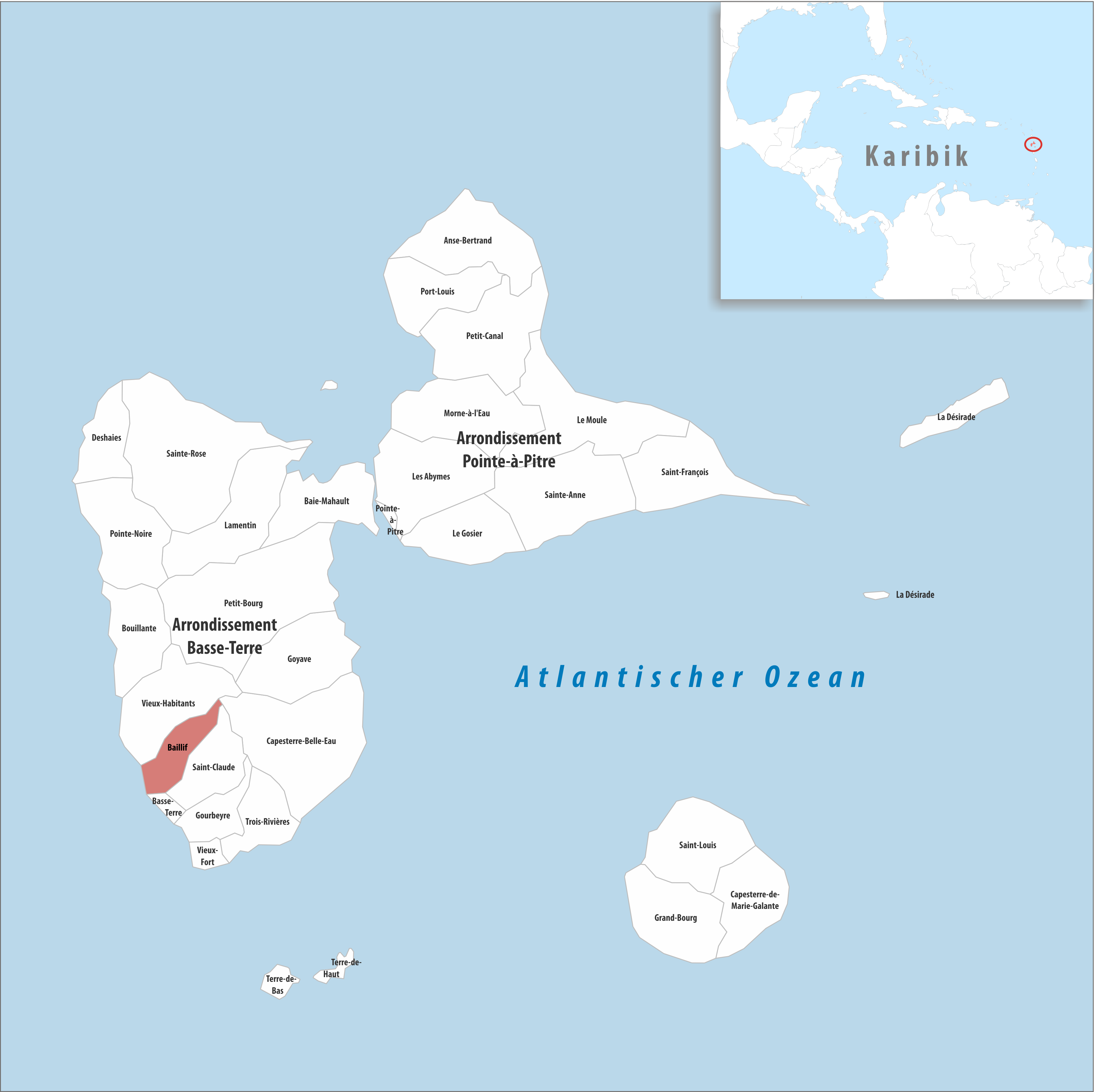
- Location of the commune (in red) within Guadeloupe
- Location of Baillif
- Location within France
- Coordinates: 16°01′N 61°45′W
- Country: France
- Overseas region and department: Guadeloupe
- Arrondissement: Basse-Terre
- Canton: Vieux-Habitants
- Intercommunality: CA Grand Sud Caraïbe

Government
  - Mayor (2020–2026): Marie-Yveline Ponchateau-Théobald
- Area^{1}: 24.30 km^{2} (9.38 sq mi)
- Elevation: 15 m (49 ft)
- Highest elevation: 1,354 m (4,442 ft)
- Lowest elevation: 0 m (0 ft)
- Population (2023): 5,096
  - Density: 209.7/km^{2} (543.2/sq mi)
- Demonym: Baillifien
- Time zone: UTC−04:00 (AST)
- INSEE/Postal code: 97104 /97123
- ^{1} French Land Register data, which excludes lakes, ponds, glaciers > 1 km^{2} (0.386 sq mi or 247 acres) and river estuaries.

Baillif (French pronunciation: [bajif]; Guadeloupean Creole: Bayif) is a commune of Guadeloupe, an overseas region and department of France located in the Lesser Antilles. Baillif is a suburb of Basse-Terre, the prefecture and the second-largest urban area of Guadeloupe located on Basse-Terre Island (the western half of Guadeloupe).

== History ==
In 1637, Governor De L'Olive conceded a parcel of land to the Dominican friars, from the Fathers' river to that of Baillif, and today these mark out the boundary of the town. Under the leadership of Father Labat, several fortresses were built in Baillif to protect the region from English invasion. The Dominicans came to preach the good news of Jesus.

Following the defeat of Napoleon in the Napoleonic Wars in 1815, the governor of Guadeloupe, the Comte de Linois refused to surrender his position to the Bourbon-appointed governor of the Windward Islands, the Comte de Vaugiraud, and believed the stories of Napoleon's defeat to be propaganda and lies. As such, de Vaugiraud invited the British to invade the island. The ensuing battle on August 8 between the joint Bourbon and British invasion force against the Napoleonic garrison took place at Baillif in which the Napoleonic loyalists where defeated and forced Linois to capitulate.

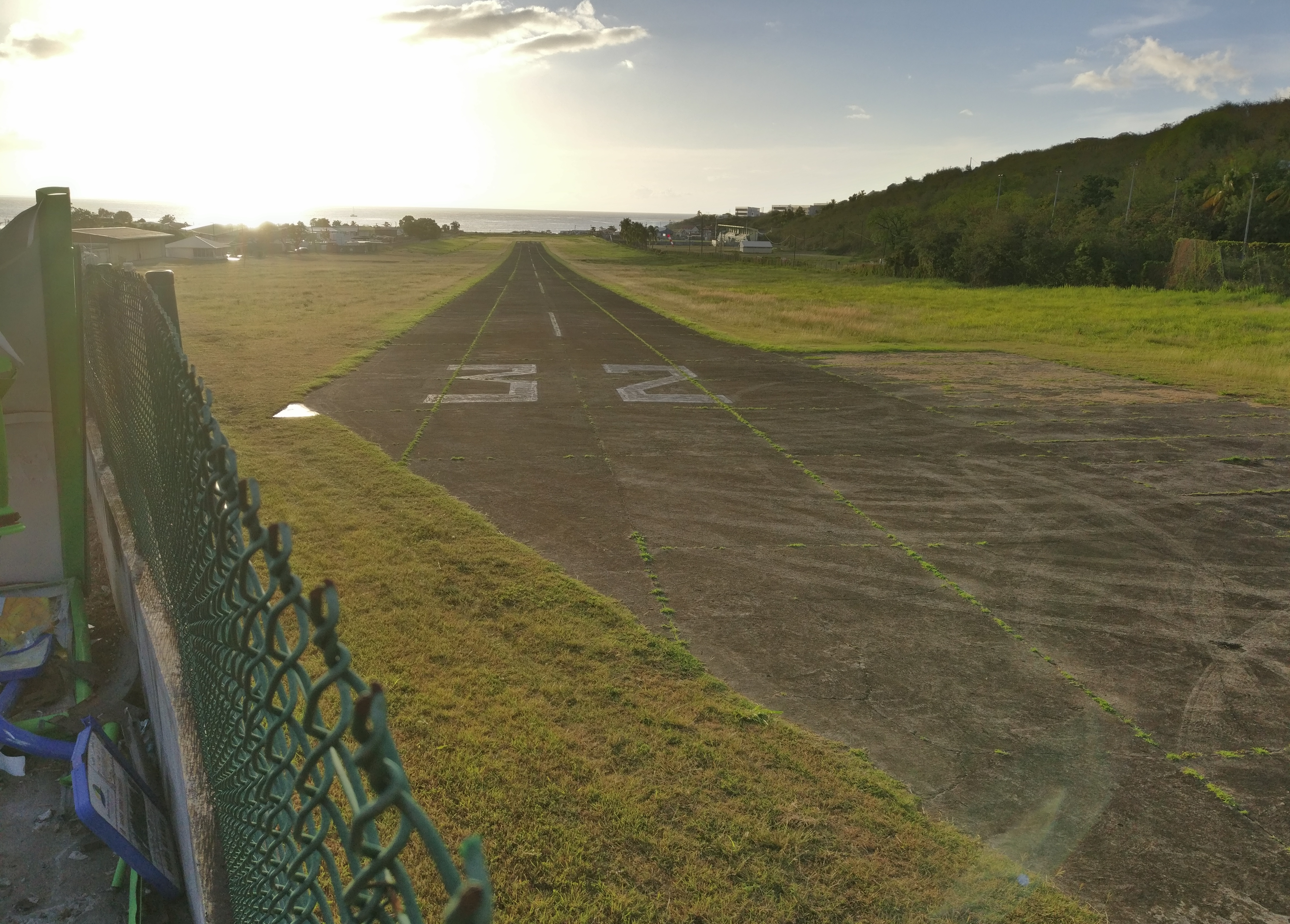
The Airfield, as seen towards the sea. Runway 32

The commune is named after an early inhabitant, Robert Baillif. Baillif traded in the area from 1650 to about 1700. Today, Baillif is often considered to be a suburb of the prefecture of Guadeloupe, Basse-Terre, and with its small regional airfield, it acts as a gateway to the islands in the south. Marie-Yveline Théobald-Ponchateau was elected mayor (maire) of Baillif in 2020.

== Geography ==
Baillif is situated on the south-west coast of Basse-Terre Island and it covers an area of 24.3 km^{2} (9.4 sq mi). It faces the Caribbean Sea. The town is west of Basse-Terre's mountain range. The capital of Guadeloupe, Basse-Terre, is south of Baillif, and Vieux-Habitants, a village, is located north. La riviere de Père flows halfway between Baillif and Basse-Terre.

=== Climate ===
Like any other Eastern Caribbean settlement, Baillif experiences quite evenly spread rainfall during the year, with a wetter season between July and November which coincides with hurricane season. Guadeloupe has been struck by many hurricanes which have caused devastation. The town receives below 1500 mm of rainfall. Tropical heat is the norm, bringing constant highs of around 32 °C (89 °F) that drop to 20 °C (68 °F) at night.

Trade winds, called alizés, blow from the northeast and often temper the climate.

== Population ==
The inhabitants are called Baillifiens in French.

Historical population
Year	Pop.	±% p.a.
1967	5,214	—
1974	5,847	+1.65%
1982	5,612	−0.51%
1990	6,004	+0.85%
1999	5,837	−0.31%
2007	5,836	−0.00%
2012	5,287	−1.96%
2017	5,605	+1.18%
2023	5,096	−1.57%
Source: INSEE

== Economy ==
Baillif has mainly an agricultural sector a. Mixed crops such as bananas, cocoa and coffee are grown. They are shipped to the port or the airport to be transported. Baillif has an airport, Baillif Airport & the runway is 2,034 ft (620 m) and the International Civil Aviation Organization airport code is TFFB & the International Air Transport Association airport code is BBR.

Today, an industrial and commercial zone is under development, supplementing the Jarry zone.

== Sights ==
With its small regional airfield, it acts as a gateway to the islands in the south. The airport from 19 October 2019 is now French language only for arriving and departing traffic.

At the entry to the market town, there is a 4 m tower as evidence of this historical past called the “Père Labat Tower”.

Further while going towards Vieux-Habitants, is the “engraved rocks” of Plessis.

== Education ==
Public preschools and primary schools include:

- Ecole primaire Saint-Robert
- Ecole primaire Bourg 1 Baillif
- Ecole maternelle Bourg Baillif

Public junior high schools include:

- Collège Jean Jaures

== Personalities ==
- Joseph Bologne, Chevalier de Saint-Georges, (1745–1799), French Composer, Violinist, Fencer, and Colonel of the Légion St.-Georges.
- Gratien Candace, (1873–1953), French politician

== See also ==
- Communes of the Guadeloupe department
