= Trois-Rivières, Guadeloupe =

Trois-Rivières
- Commune
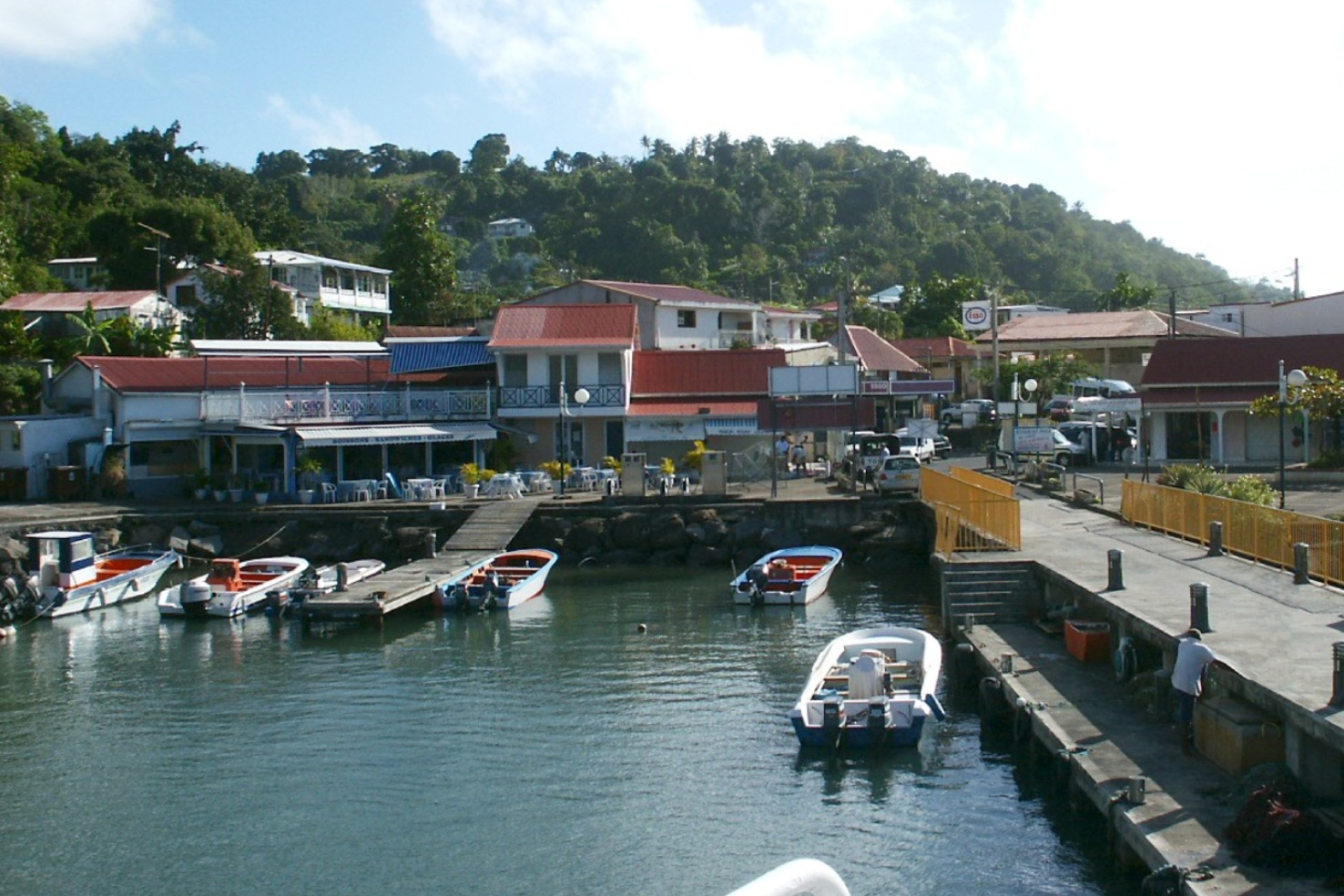
- The harbour of Trois-Rivières

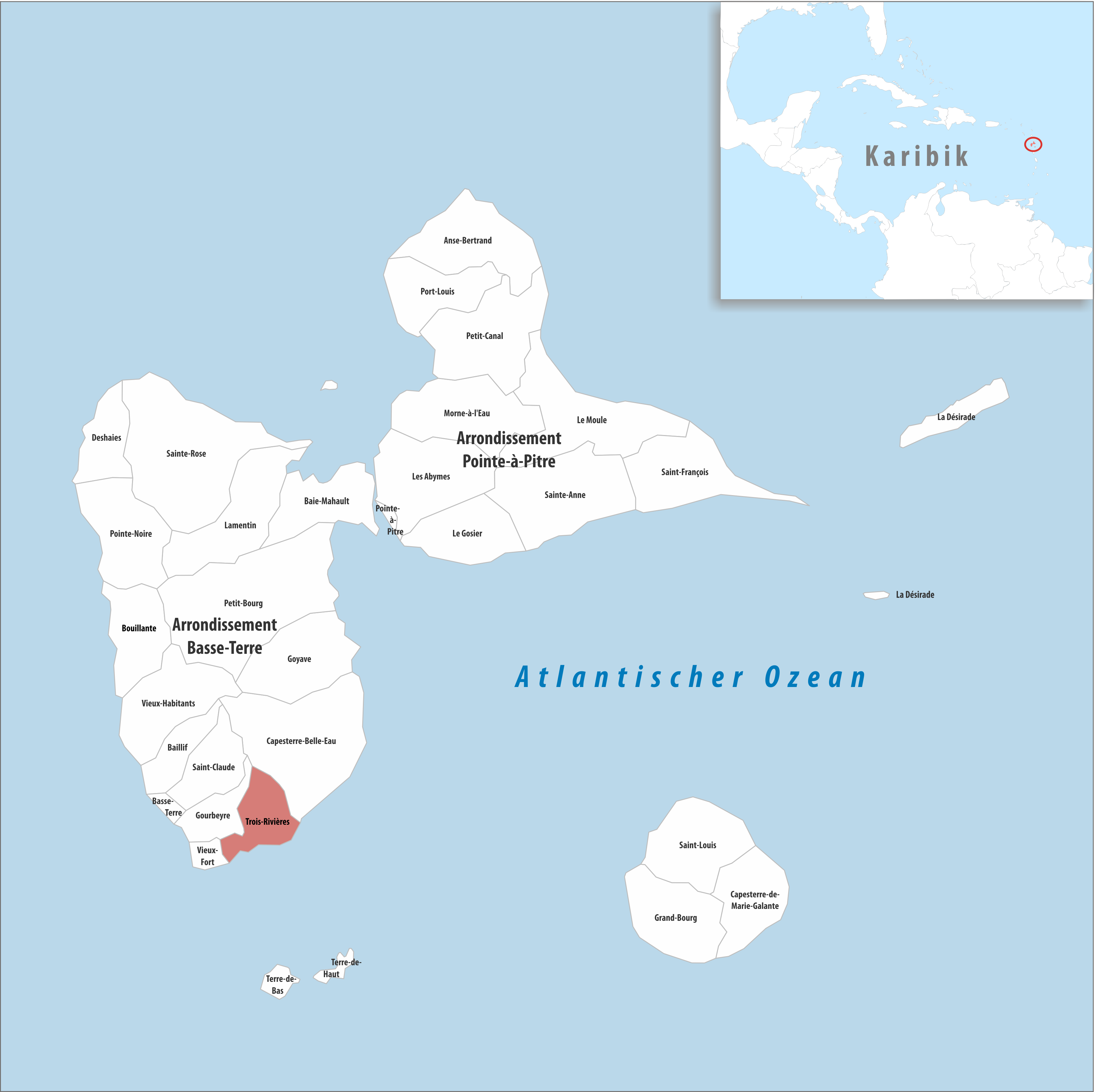
- Location of the commune (in red) within Guadeloupe
- Location of Trois-Rivières
- Coordinates: 15°59′00″N 61°39′00″W
- Country: France
- Overseas region and department: Guadeloupe
- Arrondissement: Basse-Terre
- Canton: Trois-Rivières
- Intercommunality: CA Grand Sud Caraïbe

Government
  - Mayor (2020–2026): Jean-Louis Francisque
- Area^{1}: 31.10 km^{2} (12.01 sq mi)
- Elevation: 0 m (0 ft)
- Population (2023): 7,415
  - Density: 238.4/km^{2} (617.5/sq mi)
- Time zone: UTC−04:00 (AST)
- INSEE/Postal code: 97132 /97114
- Trois-Rivières Lighthouse
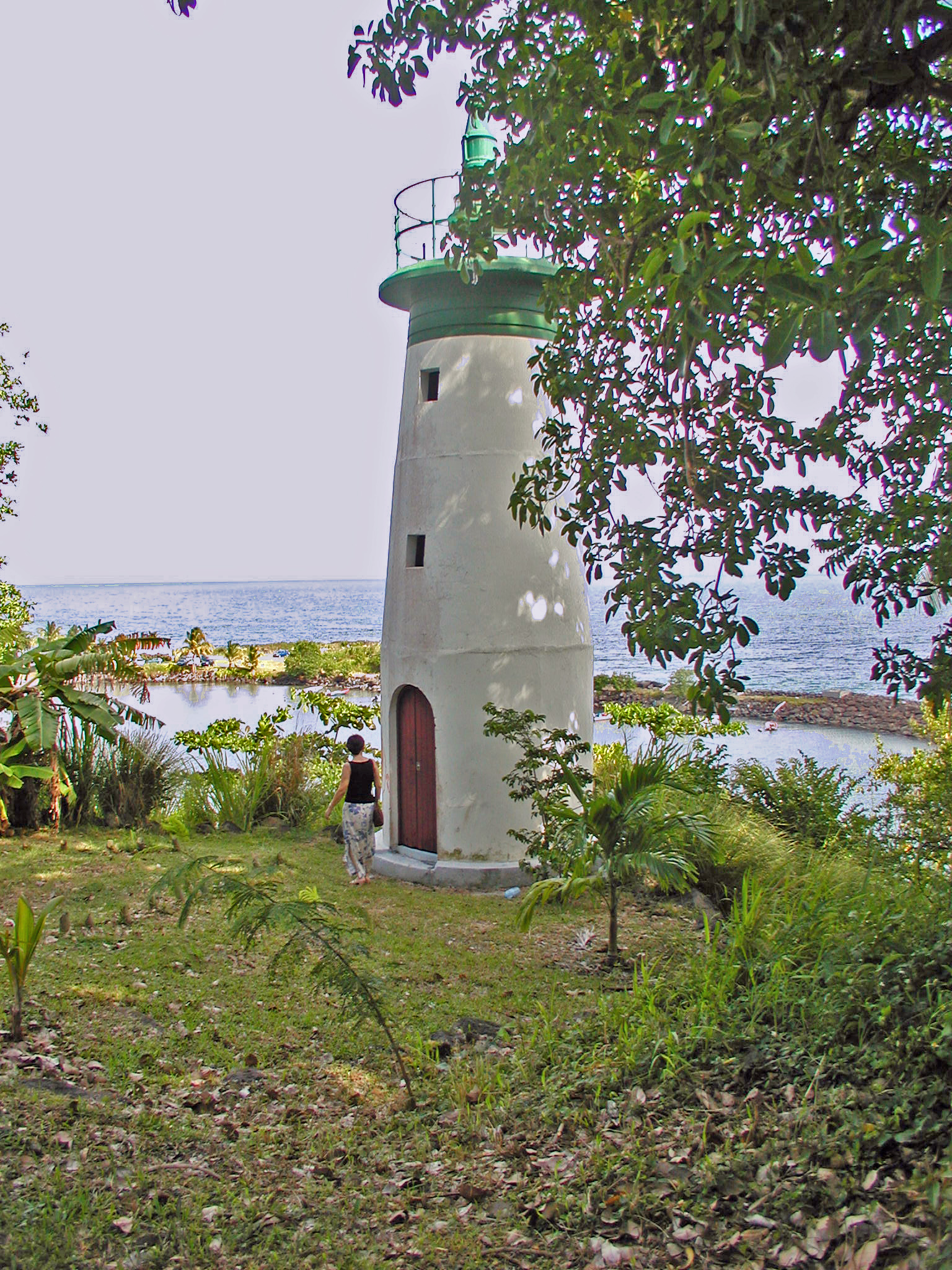
- Construction: masonry tower
- Height: 9 m (30 ft)
- Shape: massive tapered cylindrical tower with balcony and light
- Markings: white tower with green band on the top, green balcony
- Power source: mains electricity
- Focal height: 25 m (82 ft)
- Range: 1 nmi (1.9 km; 1.2 mi) (white), 7 nmi (13 km; 8.1 mi) (red), 7 nmi (13 km; 8.1 mi) (green)
- Characteristic: Iso WRG
- ^{1} French Land Register data, which excludes lakes, ponds, glaciers > 1 km^{2} (0.386 sq mi or 247 acres) and river estuaries.

Trois-Rivières (French pronunciation: [tʁwɑ ʁivjɛʁ]; literally "Three Rivers"; Antillean Creole: Twarivyè) is a commune in the overseas department of Guadeloupe, and the seat of the Canton of Trois-Rivières. It is on the south coast of the island of Basse-Terre. It is surrounded with the towns of Capesterre-Belle-Eau, Vieux-Fort and Gourbeyre.

== Population ==
Historical population
Year	Pop.	±% p.a.
1967	9,268	—
1974	8,869	−0.63%
1982	8,094	−1.14%
1990	8,556	+0.70%
1999	8,738	+0.23%
2007	8,884	+0.21%
2012	8,714	−0.39%
2017	8,124	−1.39%
2023	7,415	−1.51%
Source: INSEE

== Twin towns ==
It is twinned with La Ferté-Saint-Aubin, a town in Loiret, France.

== Education ==
Public preschools and primary schools:

- Ecole primaire Bourg 1 Trois-Rivières
- Ecole primaire Bourg 2 Trois-Rivières
- Ecole primaire Grand-Anse
- Ecole primaire Schoelcher
- Ecole maternelle La Plaine
- Ecole Bourg 2 de Trois-Rivières

Public junior high schools include:

- Collège Les Roches gravées

== See also ==
- List of lighthouses in Guadeloupe
- Communes of the Guadeloupe department
