= Gourbeyre =

- Commune
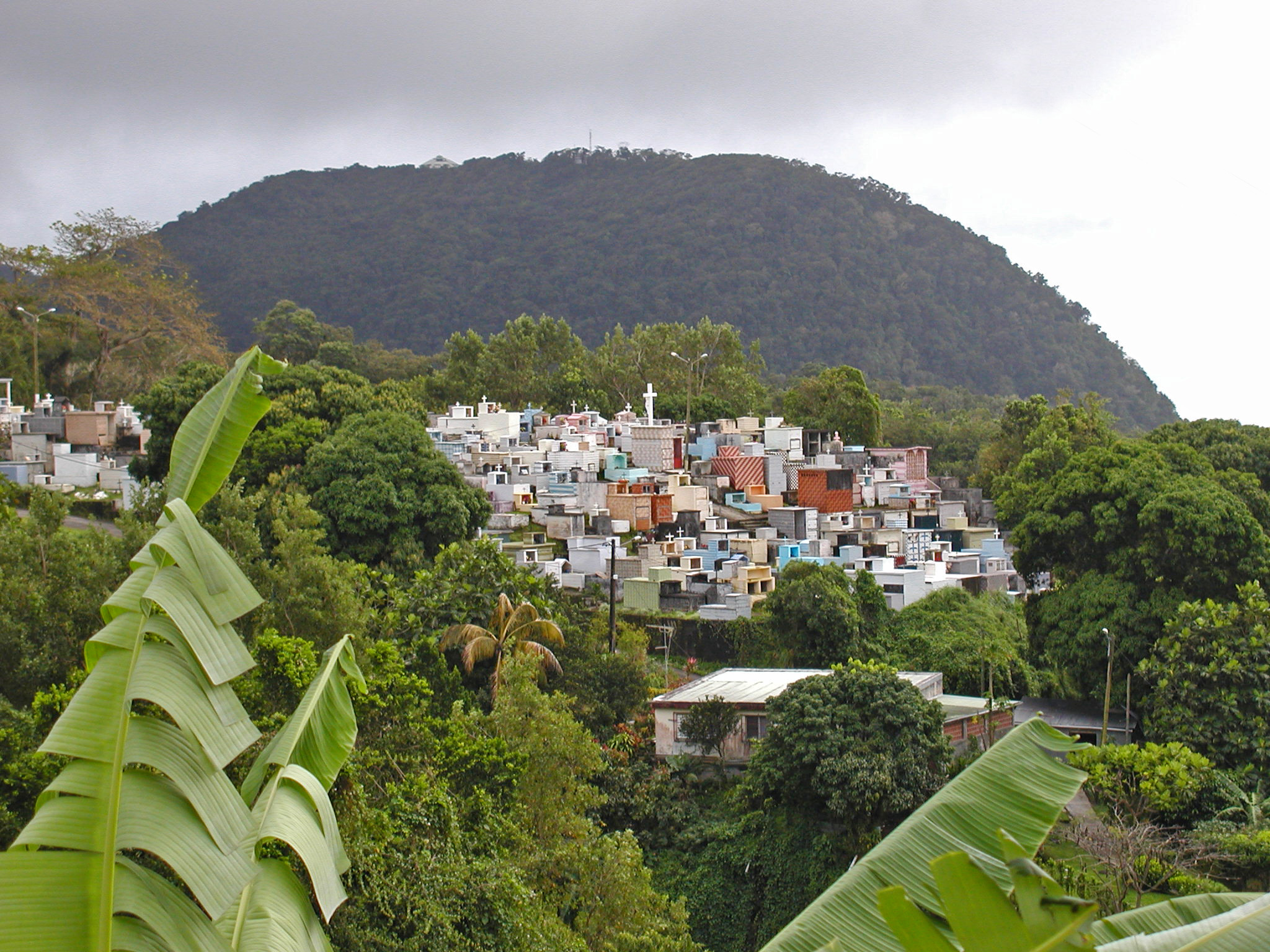
- Gourbeyre Cemetery adjoins the church and overlooks the sea

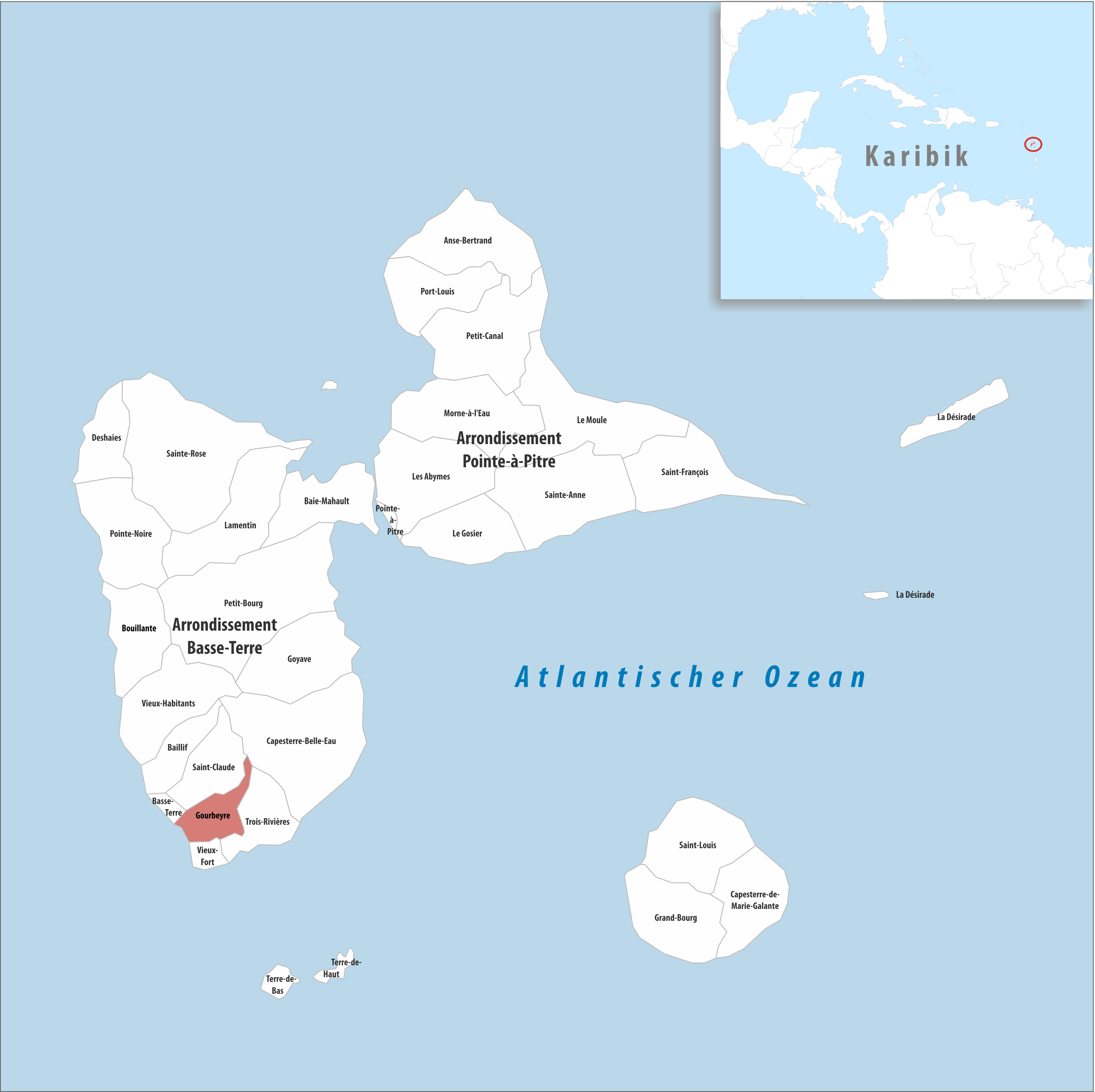
- Location of the commune (in red) within Guadeloupe
- Location of Gourbeyre
- Coordinates: 16°00′N 61°42′W
- Country: France
- Overseas region and department: Guadeloupe
- Arrondissement: Basse-Terre
- Canton: Trois-Rivières
- Intercommunality: CA Grand Sud Caraïbe

Government
  - Mayor (2020–2026): Claude Edmond
- Area^{1}: 22.52 km^{2} (8.70 sq mi)
- Population (2023): 7,307
  - Density: 324.5/km^{2} (840.4/sq mi)
- Time zone: UTC−04:00 (AST)
- INSEE/Postal code: 97109 /97113
- ^{1} French Land Register data, which excludes lakes, ponds, glaciers > 1 km^{2} (0.386 sq mi or 247 acres) and river estuaries.

Gourbeyre (French pronunciation: [ɡuʁbɛʁ]; Guadeloupean Creole: Goubè) is a commune in the French overseas region and department of Guadeloupe, in the Lesser Antilles. It is a suburb of the city of Basse-Terre.

The commune of Gourbeyre was in the past a pivotal point in the defense of Guadeloupe's Basse-Terre Island.

== Government ==
From 1640 to 1643 the government of Guadeloupe consisted entirely of governor Aubert. The governor's house is regarded as the most beautiful in the commune of Gourbeyre.

Charles Houël was named governor in 1648 and immediately began the construction of the Fort of Saint Charles on the right bank of the Galleon River. This moved the seat of government. The Fort (renamed Fort Delgrès in 1989) was placed to resist the attack of the English by providing cover for French ships.

== Colonisation ==
"Montagne Saint-Charles et du Palmiste" was the name given for the Gourbeyre commune up to the 17th century. Through the 18th century it was an important capital in colonial France.

Gourbeyre had some military importance due to its mountainous topography. The area was considered to be impregnable during the English attacks of 1691 and 1703. Colonists were attracted to settle in Gourbeyre because of trading opportunities and in view of the protection provided against English attacks for residents in Gourbeyre.

== Religion ==
Many religious communities settled in the commune of Gourbeyre. By 1650 monks had obtained the rights to cultivate the land and in the cases of the Order of Our Lady of Mount Carmel and the Jesuits had turned to cultivation of sugar plantations and the refining of sugar. In Bisdary the Jesuits were vested with 250 hectares of sugar cane which was cultivated and maintained by up to 400 slaves.

== Further history ==
At the beginning of the 19th century, the commune of Gourbeyre had 461 whites, 3418 slaves and 168 of other races.

Very serious events occurred in the commune of Gourbeyre, particularly in Dolé village, with the revolt of Delgrès opposed to the Richepanse general, sent by Napoleon. In January 1838, a new municipal organization detached the commune of Gourbeyre, from Basse-Terre.

In 1843, a terrible earthquake destroyed the area. The governor admiral of Gourbeyre was instrumental in reconstructing the area.

After a fire in 1955, and hurricanes in 1964 and 1979, a new building was built here in 1986 to house the departmental records and historical private papers important to the history of the island. It also hosts researchers, students and personalities.

== Geography ==
Gourbeyre is located east of the city Basse-Terre and southwest of the Soufrière volcano. Gourbeyre is near a river and located on the N1 highway. Gourbeyre is at the crossing point between the windward and the leeward shores.

== Population ==
Historical population
Year	Pop.	±% p.a.
1967	7,066	—
1974	6,813	−0.52%
1982	6,399	−0.78%
1990	6,330	−0.14%
1999	7,642	+2.11%
2007	8,088	+0.71%
2012	7,820	−0.67%
2017	7,795	−0.06%
2023	7,307	−1.07%
Source: INSEE

== Economy ==
Crops such as cocoa, coffee and bananas are grown in the mountains and a sugar factory produces sugar at the river's estuary. Cattle rearing is also done.

Historical and natural sites brings tourists to Gourbeyre. Also a marina is down at the shoreline, nearby Basse-Terre.

== Education ==
Public preschools and primary schools include:

- Ecole primaire Noglotte Eugène
- Ecole primaire Luce Joseph
- Ecole maternelle Raymonde Augustin
- Ecole maternelle Blanchet
- Ecole maternelle Champfleury

Public junior high schools include:

- Collège Richard Samuel

Private secondary schools under contract:

- LP Blanchet

== Sights ==
- Center observatory of Soufrière
- Departmental records of Guadeloupe
- Marina of Sens River
- Warm baths of the village of Dolé

== Notable residents ==
- Lucette Michaux-Chevry, (1929-2021), former mayoress of Gourbeyre and Basse-Terre.
- Marie-Luce Penchard, (born 1959), mayor of Basse-Terre (since 2014).

== See also ==
- Communes of the Guadeloupe department
