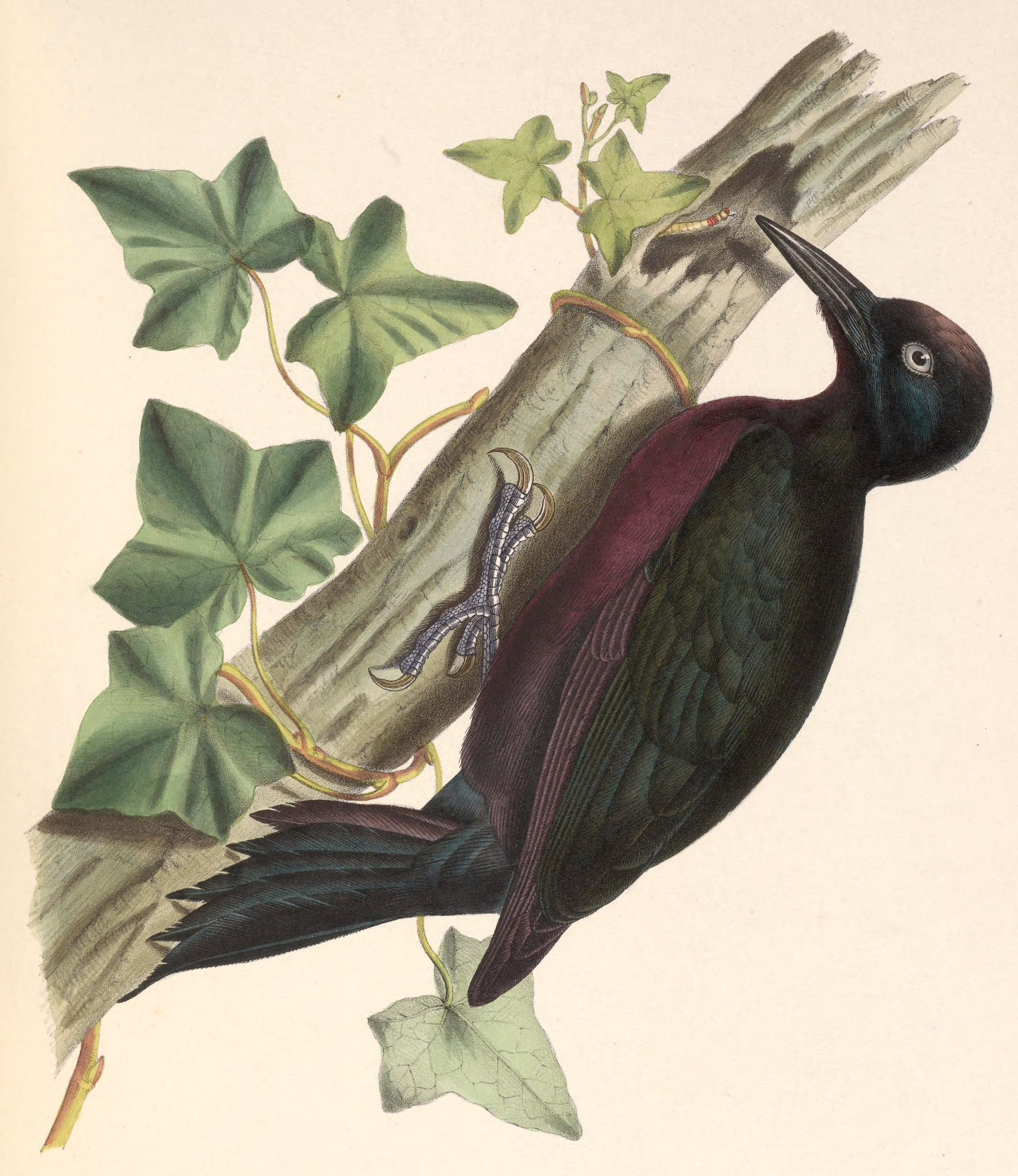

Conservation status
- Least Concern (IUCN 3.1)

Scientific classification
- Kingdom: Animalia
- Phylum: Chordata
- Class: Aves
- Order: Piciformes
- Family: Picidae
- Genus: Melanerpes
- Species: M. herminieri

Binomial name
- Melanerpes herminieri (Lesson, 1830)
- Guadeloupe woodpecker range

Synonyms
- • Picus herminieri (Lesson, 1830) • Linneopicus herminieri (Lesson, 1830)

= Guadeloupe woodpecker =

Species of bird

The Guadeloupe woodpecker (Melanerpes herminieri) or Tapeur is a species of bird in the woodpecker family Picidae belonging to the genus Melanerpes. Endemic to the Guadeloupe archipelago in the Lesser Antilles, it is a medium-sized forest woodpecker with entirely black plumage and red-to-purple reflections on its stomach. It lives mainly in the islands' tropical rainforest areas. The woodpecker has no sexual dimorphism. The species has adapted under the pressure of urbanization to more open forest environments.

During the breeding season, the Guadeloupe woodpecker is solitary bird that nests in holes it digs with its beak in the trunk of dead trees—mainly coconut—where the female lays three to five eggs. The eggs are incubated for fifteen days before hatching, after which the adult female feeds the chicks in the nest for about a month. Juvenile birds stay with the parents for several months before becoming independent. Guadeloupe woodpeckers are mainly insectivorous, but they also feed on small vertebrates like tree frogs and Anolis marmoratus, as well as a variety of seasonal fruits.

The Guadeloupe woodpecker was long considered "near-threatened" according to the International Union for Conservation of Nature due to its endemism, predation of its eggs and nests by black rats, its relatively low numbers, and the specificities of the archipelago—island topography, habitat fragmentation, and urbanization. It was downgraded to an assessment of "least concern" in July 2019. While the Guadeloupe woodpecker seems relatively protected on the island Basse-Terre, the state of its populations on Grande-Terre—where there are risks of extinction—is much more of a problem. It has become an emblem of Guadeloupean fauna and is now commonly found in the Guadeloupe National Park.

== Taxonomy ==
Described in 1830 by René Primevère Lesson in the genus Picus, the Guadeloupe woodpecker was given its binomial name, Melanerpes herminieri, after the naturalist Félix Louis L'Herminier, who studied in Guadeloupe and wrote numerous works on birds. The name of the genus Melanerpes comes from the Greek melas meaning "black" and herpēs meaning "climber". In the local Guadeloupe Creole, it is called Tapeur or Tapé ("one who knocks"). It is also called Toto bwa or Toc-toc for its tapping noise.

The Guadeloupe woodpecker had been considered for some time to be in the monotypic genus Linneopicus before being classified in the genus Melanerpes. It may have evolved during the Pleistocene from the Puerto Rican woodpecker (M. portoricensis), which itself is derived phylogenetically from the red-headed woodpecker (M. erythrocephalus). The phylogenetic position diagram of the genus Melanerpes is the least-known among the family Picidae, whose divergence into the subfamilies Jynginae, Picumninae, and Picinae—to which Melanerpes belongs—dates from 30 to 20 million years ago in the Oligocene or lower Miocene.

== Distribution and habitat ==
Since the extinction of the Guadeloupe parakeet (Psittacara labati) and the Guadeloupe amazon (Amazona violacea) in the 18th century (if they existed), the Guadeloupe woodpecker is the only bird species that is endemic to Guadeloupe, and is the only woodpecker species found in the Lesser Antilles. It, along with two species of forest bats and two species of frogs, is one of the archipelago's five endemic animal species.

The Guadeloupe woodpecker is present on the main island from sea level to the upper tree line, at around 1,000 m (39,000 in) altitude, but is historically more common on island of Basse-Terre, where it has a preference for the island's east coast, than on Grande-Terre. It is absent from the dependencies of Guadeloupe (Îles des Saintes, Marie-Galante, and La Désirade).

The Guadeloupe woodpecker, an exclusively stationary species, is found in a wide variety of forest types across the islands: it is most common in the tropical rainforest areas of Basse-Terre; in 1998, these rainforests had more than 70 percent of the population of the species in Guadeloupe, 5 percent were in deciduous areas, while the deciduous forests of Grande-Terre hosted about 20 percent, and the mangrove and swamp in the center of the archipelago held the remaining 5 percent.

In 2008, a study of Guadeloupean avifauna showed the presence of the Guadeloupe woodpecker in all zones of Guadeloupe National Park, where it prefers Côte-au-vent, the ombrophile massif on the eastern coast of the island, as well as the northwestern zone towards Deshaies north of the Côte-sous-le-vent. The species also seems to have colonized the Caribbean Mountains at the southern tip of Basse-Terre between 1998 and 2007. In 2008, Basse-Terre hosted three-quarters of the population of woodpeckers in the archipelago and Grande-Terre the other quarter.

The Guadeloupe woodpecker is a territorial bird but not particularly aggressive towards other birds, with which it seldom interacts. The species needs a territory of between two and five hectares (4.9 and 12.4 acres) per pair to live, and even ten hectares (25 acres) at the southern tip of the more-arid Grande-Terre.

== Description ==
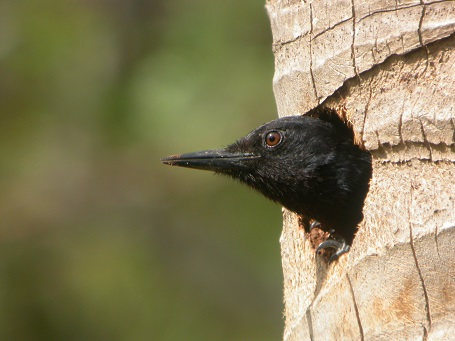
Guadeloupe woodpecker at the entrance to its nest.

The Guadeloupe woodpecker is a medium-sized, robust woodpecker species measuring 26–28 cm (10–11 in) in length, and with a mass of 86–97 g (3.0–3.4 oz) in males and 69–78 g (2.4–2.8 oz) in females. It is distinct in its appearance within its genus, and unlike other species of Melanerpes, males and females do not present a marked sexual dimorphism in their plumage; they are entirely black with gradual reflections ranging from dark red to burgundy on the ventral plumage, dark blue on the back, and metallic blue on the wing tips. Males have a wingspan of 42.5 cm (16.7 in) compared with 40.5 cm (15.9 in) in females). The black coloration of the Guadeloupe woodpecker may be an advantage in drying feathers by exposure to the sun and fighting against humidity, and the black feathers may be resistant to abrasion, but no definitive explanation has been advanced by the scientific community. This woodpecker is solitary animal, a social behavioral trait that is often associated with plumage monomorphism.

The legs, which terminate in four toes in a zygodactyl arrangement, are gray-green to gray-blue and powerful, with highly developed talons. The talons are curved for gripping bark with the tip of the claw; this represents an adaptation to living on trunks and branches of trees. The eyes are 6 mm (0.24 in) in diameter (pupil 2 mm (0.079 in)) with dark brown irises. The beak is entirely black and is between 15 and 20 percent longer and more robust in males; this is the main criterion for recognizing the sex of individuals. The size of the female's beak is equal to that of her head while that of the male is distinctly longer.

As with all woodpeckers that are adapted to piercing wood, the nostrils on the culmen have small feathers to protect respiration and mucous glands to trap dust. The pterygoid protractor muscle, which is highly developed in woodpeckers, is important for adapting to shock absorption by uncoupling the beak, which can move laterally, from the skull to minimize the transmission of kinetic energy to the brain and eyes. There is also a specific pterygoid bone in Picidae compared to other birds. They have a specific cancellous tissue between the skull and the beak, with a displacement of the attachment of the greater horn of the hyoid bone to the quadrate bone, as well as a reinforced sternum and keel. These elements maximize energy dissipation and shock absorption for the bird during impact. The specific, long tongue of the Picidae is cylindrical and is about twice the size of its bill. The tongue is the result of an evolution of the hyoid apparatus with two parts; one bony at the end is equipped with small hooks, the other cartilaginous lengthens under the action of a branchiomandibular muscle that attaches to the branch of the mandible, split, anchoring on the anterior part at the base of the culmen, surrounding the skull from behind with its two branches, descending on either side of the spine, esophagus and larynx, which pushes the hyoid horns and tongue out of the beak.

Juvenile birds are similar to adults but have duller, dark brown plumage. The life expectancy of individuals is greater than five years and estimated to be between eight and ten years.

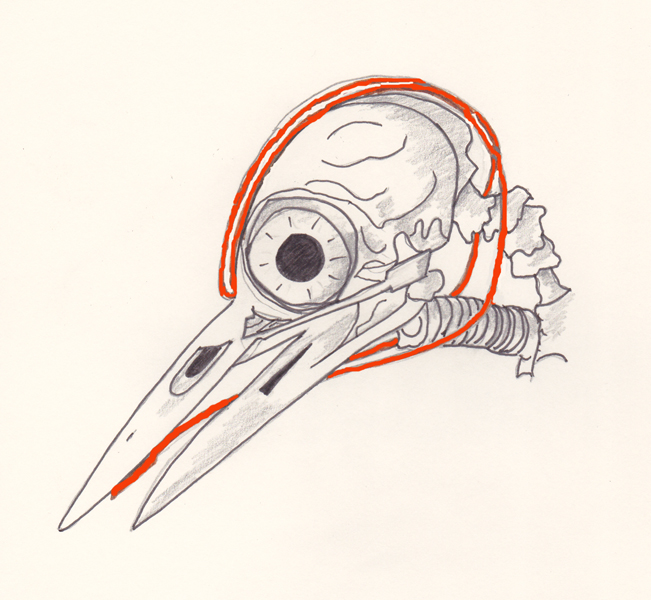
Typical woodpecker skull, showing (in red) the elongation and attachments of the hyoid apparatus, forming at its tip the tongue of the bird.

== Behavior ==
=== Food ===
The adult Guadeloupe woodpecker feeds mainly on termites, ants, larvae, myriapods, and arthropods—90 percent of which are collected when piercing dead wood— and fruits. Due to the difference in the size of their beaks, males preferentially seek their prey on large branches and dead trunks while females more frequently attach themselves to branches, especially those with small cross-sections. Scientific studies of a captive woodpecker have shown the tip of the bird's long tongue has horny, backward-facing, saliva-coated hooks that allow it to grasp and extract insects from deep holes in wood rather than "harpooning" them.

It has been reported the Guadeloupe woodpecker may occasionally and opportunistically feed on a small lizards (Anolis marmoratus), which are also endemic to the archipelago. Female woodpeckers may occasionally consume crab carcasses during the breeding season to obtain the calcium necessary for the production of their eggshells.

No precise studies of woodpecker feeding, such as identification and quantity of insects consumed, in adults could be made because of the speed of their prey consumption. During the nesting period, however, studies have shown the typical diet of nestlings—brought by the parents at a rate of five times per hour—mainly consists of large prey ranging from 20–40 mm (0.79–1.57 in) with an average of 20 mm (0.79 in). Although the Guadalupe woodpecker feeds its brood half as frequently as the Jamaican woodpecker, the prey brought in is two-to-four times larger because the species—unlike its Jamaican cousin, whose beak size is identical—does not swallow or regurgitate them but carries them in its beak. The chicks' diet mainly consists of insects of the class Orthoptera (44 percent, mainly grasshoppers of the species Tapalisca and cockroaches of the species Pelmatosilpha purpurascens), larvae (20 percent, mainly beetles—including Scarabaeidae and Buprestidae—and Diptera), tree frogs Eleutherodactylus martinicensis (11 percent), adult beetles (10.5 percent, from the families Curculionidae, Cerambycidae, and Scarabaeidae), Lepidoptera (6.5 percent), and gastropods (3.2 percent), as well as fruits, mainly from the genera Clusia (70 percent), Eugenia, and Myrcia (16 percent), as well as pieces of mango (Mangifera indica). Adults do not feed ants or termites to their chicks.

The birds' water intake comes from sixteen species of seasonal fruits, the seeds and pits of which they spit out after eating the pulp, violently shaking their heads like all woodpeckers, they have rarely been observed drinking. Guadeloupe woodpeckers use anvils for cutting up large prey such as frogs and anolis, skinning insects, and cracking open seeds and hard fruits. These anvils are usually the tops of palmless coconut trees, which also provide food storage areas.

=== Breeding ===
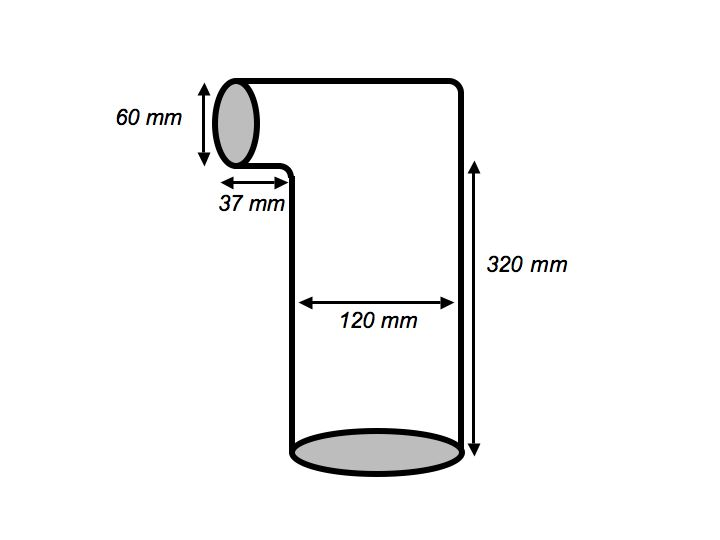
Diagram of a Melanerpes herminieri nest, with observed average section sizes, from Villard (1999).

The Guadaloupe woodpecker is solitary and does not congregate in colonies. It is an exclusive monogamist whose breeding season runs from January to August, with a peak from April to June - indicating a lack of competition in the bird's ecological niche. The breeding season is variable from pair to pair, and from year to year, the determining factor being access to optimal food, which in Guadeloupe is dependent on rainfall. Studies have shown only 6–8 percent of nestling paternities are the result of relationships outside the established pair.

The Guadeloupe woodpecker generally nests 2–20 m (79–787 in) above the ground in holes in the trunks of trees the two parents dig together. They prefer to nest in dead coconut trees and less frequently in dead branches of deciduous trees. Nesting sites are chosen after several trials and tests according to the condition of the wood; the elaboration of a nest in a living tree is exceptional because it is more difficult to achieve. Digging a 30 cm (12 in) deep nest takes the parents about ten days but the nest is often used for over two years, depending on the condition of the wood.

The female lays three to five pure white, elliptical eggs that are on average 24.6 mm × 18.5 mm (0.97 in × 0.73 in) in size and weigh about 3.5 grams (0.12 oz). The pair takes turns incubating the eggs during the 15 days of incubation, which starts with the laying of the first egg and leads to asynchronous hatching. Only the male is responsible during the nights and when the chicks are small. A pair raises up to three young, and later-hatching chicks usually do not survive to adulthood. In the darkness of the nest, the parents are assisted in feeding the chicks by a white triangle that is formed by the egg tooth and two white, greasy buttons at the corners of the chicks' bills.

Young birds leave the nest between 33 and 37 days after hatching, and live with their parents for several months, forming families that sometimes include birds from two successive nestings. It appears juvenile Guadeloupe woodpeckers stay with their parents longer than those of temperate zone woodpeckers because of the lack of a winter season that forces accelerated learning. This longer learning period increases the chances of a chick's survival but only about 10 percent of eggs will result in a young adult. The effective reproduction rate of the Guadeloupe woodpecker is unknown.

=== Flight and locomotion ===
The flight of the Guadeloupe woodpecker is straight, without undulations. The species is unusual because it does not fly over water, which limits its movements between the two main islands of Guadeloupe and explains its endemism to the archipelago and its absence from the dependencies of Guadeloupe, where it has never been observed, heard, or identified by its nests.

Unlike some Caribbean woodpecker species, such as the Jamaican woodpecker and the Hispaniolan woodpecker, the Guadeloupe woodpecker does not practice flight hunting. Another characteristic of woodpeckers, in particular the Guadeloupe woodpecker, is its absence of location on or near the ground. It is most often found in the canopy, where it moves only between trees using its climbing-adapted zygodactyl toes, the second of which towards the rear is capable of moving to a lateral position to stabilize the grip on the trunk when climbing. Like all woodpeckers, it uses its short, powerful tail as a fulcrum on the trunk for upward propulsion.

=== Vocalizations and sounds ===
The Guadeloupe woodpecker makes eight vocalized and two unvocalized sounds:

- Although they are identical in form, the female's sound is higher pitched. This dimorphism in the calls is one of the characteristics of the species; the other sounds cannot be used to distinguish between males and females;
- "rarrrrr", in a series of between three and eight notes; this is a sound of excitement of adults or juveniles;
- "tsii", along with a buzzing sound, is made by nestlings to beg for food;
- "tsi-sii" is emitted by chicks just before feeding;
- "kay-kay-kay" is emitted during territorial conflicts between adults;
- "tra-tra-tra-tra" informs of the arrival of an adult at the nest so the other will give way;
- "tray-tray-tray-tray" is made by adults calling the chicks or juveniles to locate them;
- a mutual drumming sound is made by the pair near their nest;
- the high-frequency drumming is the most perceptible and recognizable sound of the woodpecker; only males perform this medium-to-powerful roll of at least eleven beats performed in 1.3 s. This parade and territoriality drumming is very distinct from that resulting from predatory and nest-burrowing activities, which is both sexes perform six times more slowly.

The Guadeloupe woodpecker is the most-drumming species among the Caribbean and island Picidae. Its calls are the most raucous of those produced by members of the genus Melanerpes.

== Conservation ==
=== Status and threats ===
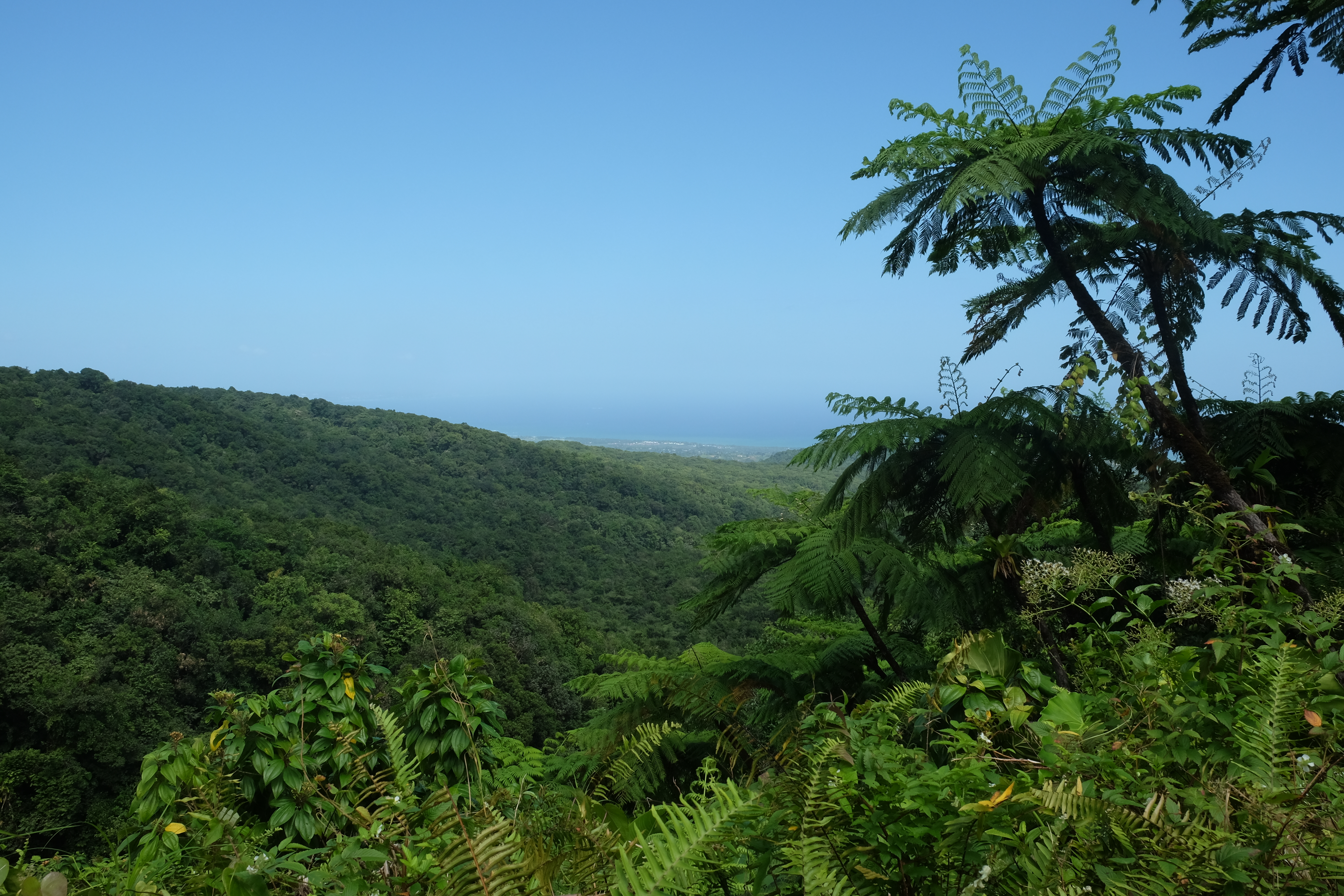
The tropical rainforest in the southeast of Basse-Terre is the preferred habitat of the Guadeloupe woodpecker.

The International Union for Conservation of Nature classifies the Guadeloupe woodpecker with a conservation status of least concern since the last assessment of the species in July 2019. Betweek 2004 and 2019, it was previously classified as near-threatened due to its uniqueness to the Guadeloupe archipelago and its relatively small population: about 10,330±1,000 pairs estimated in 1998, a number re-evaluated to 19,527±3,769 in 2007 due to a better counting methodology and definition of ecological units. The 2007 reassessment does not indicate a real increase in their population, which, according to the authors of the two studies, remained stable over the period under consideration. The reduction and fragmentation of its habitat due to human expansion and infrastructure are affecting the balance of its population, especially on Grande-Terre, where it is at risk of extinction. This is particularly the case in urbanized areas of Pointe-à-Pitre, Jarry, Grands Fonds and North Basse-Terre, which are expanding, allowing less movement of individuals between Basse-Terre and Grande-Terre through vegetation corridors. The species does not fly over non-wooded areas or bodies of water; this trait is increasingly splitting the population into two distinct groups with a moderate degree of genetic differentiation. The further reduction of island endemic bird populations may eventually lead to a bottleneck in their genetic diversity and a decline of the species due to excessive inbreeding or even its disappearance from a territory.

The removal of dead wood, which is essential to the survival of the species' nesting and feeding, is an aggravating factor. On Grande-Terre, Guadeloupe woodpeckers are forced to nest in wooden poles of telephone and electricity lines, or in living coconut trees, both of which are difficult to excavate; the species has a less-than-20 percent success rate. The passage of hurricanes over the archipelago has a strong negative impact on bird populations, in particular that of the Guadeloupe woodpecker, which is strongly dependent on coconut trees. In September 1989, Hurricane Hugo caused a decrease in numbers, especially juveniles.

=== Predators ===
Another major threat to Guadeloupe woodpeckers is predation of their eggs by black rats, the only rodents with arboreal habits, which have a major negative impact on nesting - and competition for the same nesting sites. To a lesser extent, there is predation of adults by feral and domestic cats, and very occasionally by raccoons. Mongooses do not appear to prey upon the woodpecker or its eggs.

=== Protection ===
Hunting of the Guadeloupe woodpecker has been banned since April 30, 1954. A ministerial decree of February 17, 1989, which was consolidated in 2013 and 2018, fully protected the Guadeloupe woodpecker throughout the archipelago. Following the last studies on the species' population and habitat in 2007, ornithologists recommended the creation and maintenance of essential vegetation corridors in the center of the island and the installation of dead-coconut-tree sections on the Grande-Terre as artificial nesting boxes.

== Footnotes ==
1. Undulations are the consequence of a succession of flaps and falls.
2. The central isthmus linking Basse-Terre to Grande-Terre, which is 3.5 km (2.2 miles) wide and highly urbanized with the agglomeration including Pointe-à-Pitre, Les Abymes, Baie-Mahault and Pointe-à-Pitre International Airport, and is bordered by the Grand Cul-de-sac marin to the North and the Petit Cul-de-sac marin to the South, which are impassable for the bird
3. As is the case for the Okinawa woodpecker and the Fernandina's flicker.
4. As in the case of the Northern flicker (Colaptes auratus rufipileus) on Guadalupe Island in Baja California.
5. This difference in size and weight between the sexes is probably the result of sexual selection by females for larger and more powerful males - capable of defending a territory - through intraspecific competition between males; The weight range of the species, including maximum deviations, thus varies from 63 to 103 g.
6. With more and better defined transect sampling, more enumerators, and better data processing equipment.
7. The digitized maps of the island and its vegetation cover made it possible to define new ecological units and to refine the extrapolations of their real surfaces as well as of the grounds not favourable to the bird: surface of the crests, landslides, water courses and their buffer zones.
8. Using the 2007 methods on the corrected 1998 numbers, the first estimate of 10,330±1,000 pairs (1998 method) is recalculated to 19,127 pairs (2007 method) or only 400 pairs more between the two counts.

== Bibliography ==
- Gorman, Gerard (2014). Woodpeckers of the World: The Complete Guide. A & C Black. ISBN 978-1-4081-4717-7.
- Villard, Pascal (1999). The Guadeloupe woodpecker and other islands Melanerpes. Brunoy: Society for Ornithological Studies of France. ISBN 978-2-9506548-6-1.
- Winkler, Hans (2015). Developments in Woodpecker Biology. Linz: Biologiezentrum des Oberösterreichischen Landesmuseums. ISBN 978-3-85474-317-0.
