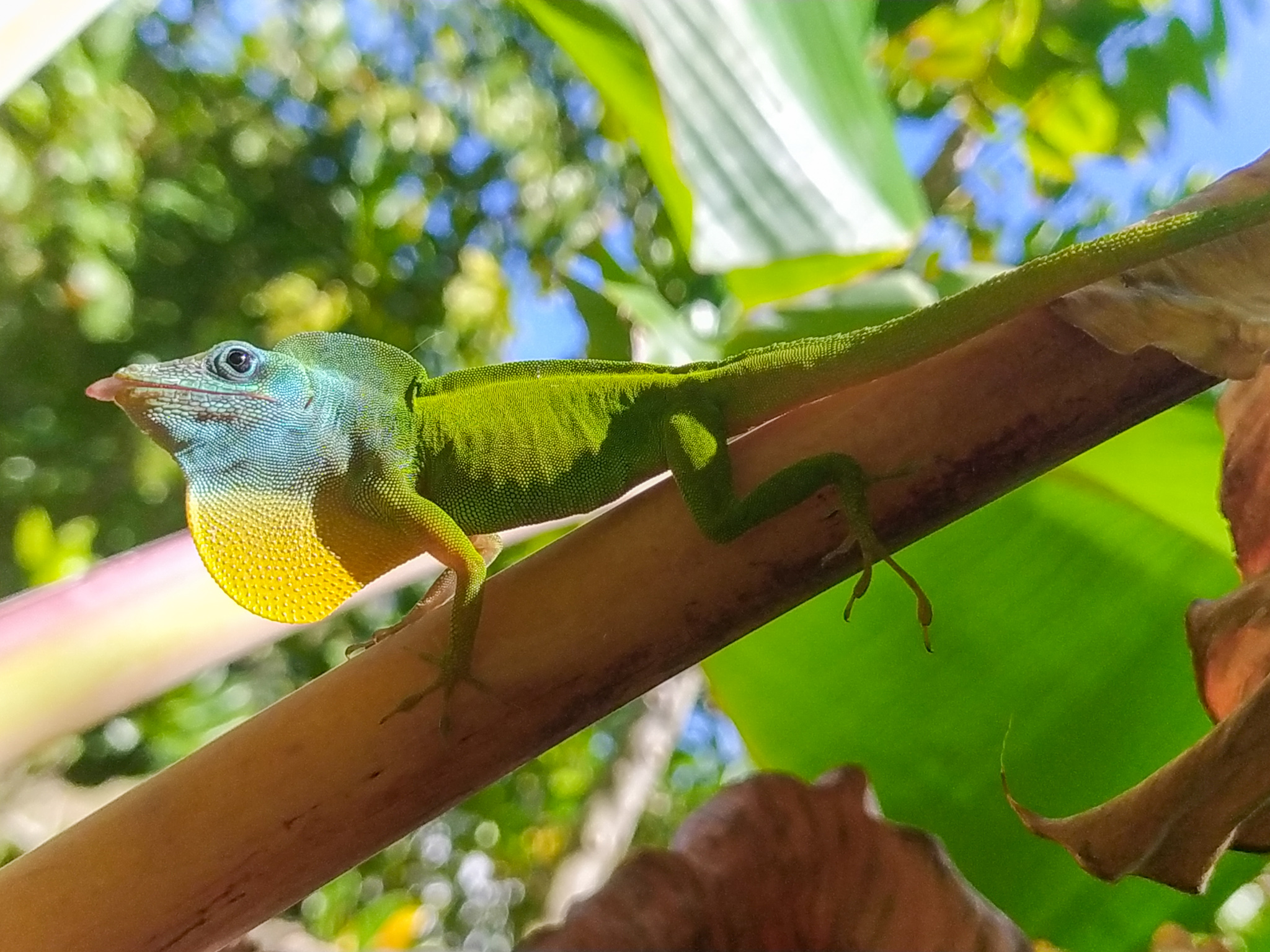

Conservation status
- Least Concern (IUCN 3.1)

Scientific classification
- Kingdom: Animalia
- Phylum: Chordata
- Class: Reptilia
- Order: Squamata
- Suborder: Iguania
- Family: Dactyloidae
- Genus: Anolis
- Species: A. marmoratus

Binomial name
- Anolis marmoratus Duméril & Bibron, 1837

Subspecies
- A. m. marmoratus Duméril & Bibron, 1837; A. m. alliaceus Cope, 1864; A. m. caryae Lazell, 1964; A. m. girafus Lazell, 1964; A. m. inornatus Lazell, 1964; A. m. setosus Lazell, 1964; A. m. speciosus Garman, 1887

Synonyms
- Anolis alliaceus Cope, 1864; Anolis speciosus Garman, 1888; Ctenonotus marmoratus — Schwartz & Henderson, 1988

= Anolis marmoratus =

Leopard anole

Species of lizard

Anolis marmoratus, commonly known as the leopard anole, Guadeloupe anole, or Guadeloupean anole, is a species of anole that is endemic to the islands of Guadeloupe, in the Caribbean Lesser Antilles.

Five former subspecies have been elevated to species status: A. ferreus, A. terraealtae, A.kahouannensis, A.chrysops, and A.desiradei.

Of the currently accepted leopard anole subspecies, five live on the island of Basse-Terre and two on the island of Grande-Terre. The validity of these subspecies has been questioned as there is extensive intergradation between them and the species shows extreme variability in its appearance; both between regions and individually in the same region. This has possibly been enhanced by habitats changes by humans (allowing populations to easier come into contact with each other) and translocations of individuals. Most leopard anoles do not clearly match the typically recognized subspecies. Genetic studies confirm that strong assortative mating between the different populations does not exist, despite their distinct differences in appearance and them having separated about 650,000 years ago (confidence interval starting at 351,000 years).

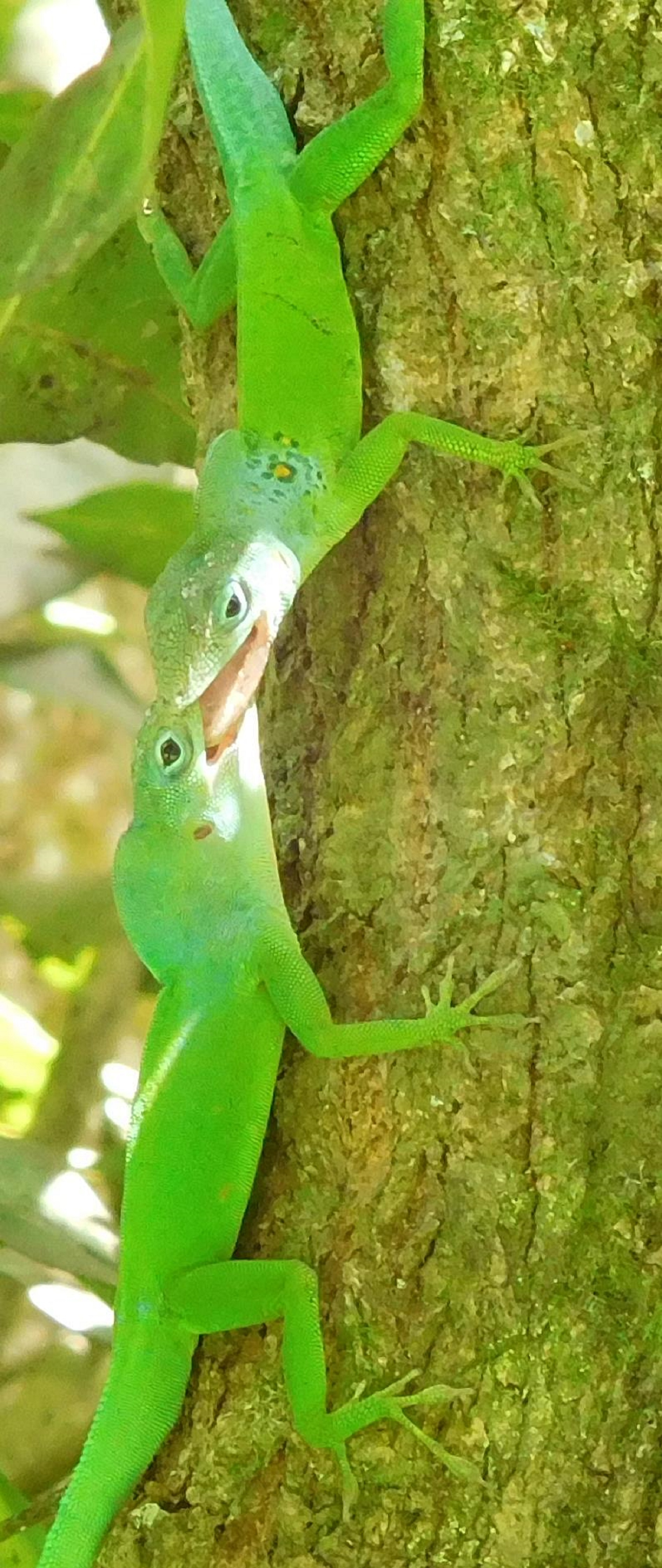
Males fighting

== List of current subspecies ==
The following is a table showing the description and geographical distribution of all the currently accepted subspecies of Anolis marmoratus.

Image	Subspecies	Description	Distribution
	Anolis marmoratus marmoratus	Adult males are green shading to blue on the tail and yellow-green on the limbs. The head is deep blue-green, the neck and the orbital area are marbled with orange, the dewlap is orange-yellow with yellow scales	Capesterre in the southeast of Basse-Terre.
	Anolis marmoratus giraffus	Head and neck are grey brown with green-blue trunk and tail, black barring and yellow reticulations on head and neck .Dewlap is yellow with white scales	West coast of Basse-Terre.
	Anolis marmoratus setosus	Head an neck grey brown and thorax is brown, the trunk is green fading to blue and then greyish brown on the tail.The dewlap is yellow with greenish scales.Row of conical neck scales.	North-west coast of Basse-Terre.
	Anolis marmoratus speciosus	Trunk and abdomen bright green fading to bluish green on the tail, orbital area is sky blue, head and neck area may be heavily blotched with electric blue.Dewlap is yellow with green-grey scales	Southern area of Grande-Terre as well as south-east region of Basse-Terre.
	Anolis marmoratus inornatus	Trunk and abdomen are green with blue tail, head neck and orbital area are brown.Dewlap is yellow with whitish scales. (photo shown is an A.marmoratus inornatus x speciosus hybrid)	Northern area of GrandeTerre.
A. m. alliaceus male breeding with female A. m inornatus	Anolis marmoratus alliaceus	Superficially similar to A. marmoratus giraffus, Head is bright olive green fading to electric green on the neck and body, the tail is electric blue.A number of black spots dot the head and abdomen, spots may be surrounded by yellow rings.The dewlap is yellow-orange with yellow green scales.	Rainforests in the interior of Basse-Terre, confirmed up to 743 metres above sea level on Morne à Louis.
