= Benjamin Shreve =

American herpetologist

- Born: 1908
- Died: 1985 (aged 76–77)
- Known for: Herpetology
- Scientific career
- Author abbrev. (zoology): Shreve

Benjamin Shreve (1908–1985) was an American amateur herpetologist. He was from a wealthy Boston family of jewellers (partners and managers of Shreve, Crump & Low) and worked at the Harvard Museum of Comparative Zoology as a volunteer. He was trained by Arthur Loveridge to deal with materials from elsewhere than Africa. Shreve described many species from the West Indies together with Thomas Barbour. In these papers, Shreve is said to have done the "spadework" while Barbour wrote "florid" introductions.

== Species named in honor of Benjamin Shreve ==
Reptiles named in honor of Shreve include:

- Dipsadoboa shrevei – Shreve's (nocturnal) tree snake
- Oreosaurus shrevei – Shreve's lightbulb lizard (Riama shrevei is a synonym)
- Anolis shrevei – Shreve's anole
- Sphaerodactylus shrevei – Shreve's least gecko

Amphibians named in honor of Shreve are:

- Dendrobates shrevei (now a synonym of Andinobates minutus) – bluebelly poison frog
- Hyla shrevei (now a synonym of Osteopilus wilderi) – green bromeliad frog or Wilder's treefrog
- Anomaloglossus shrevei – Shreve's rocket frog
- Pristimantis shrevei
