= Ferdinand Joseph L'Herminier =

French botanist (1802–1866)

Ferdinand Joseph L'Herminier (1802–1866) was a French botanist and zoologist born in Basse-Terre, Guadeloupe. He was the son of naturalist Félix Louis L'Herminier (1779–1833), and a student of Henri Marie Ducrotay de Blainville (1777–1850), of whom he published a revision of works in 1827.

As a botanist, L'Herminier specialized in the study of pteridophytes and bryophytes found in Guadeloupe. Alone, and with his father, he conducted ornithological studies on the island, however notes and specimens associated with this research were destroyed during the earthquake of 1843. As a physician, he was director of the island's hospital.

In 1832, Jean Baptiste Antoine Guillemin and George Samuel Perrottet named the botanical genus Herminiera after him. For his services in Guadeloupe, especially in the earthquake in 1843 and during the cholera epidemic of 1866, he was honored with a membership in the Legion of Honor.

Ferdinand L'Herminier died at Pointe-à-Pitre in 1866.
