= Draco biaro =

Scientific classification
- Kingdom: Animalia
- Phylum: Chordata
- Class: Reptilia
- Order: Squamata
- Suborder: Iguania
- Family: Agamidae
- Genus: Draco
- Species: D. biaro

Binomial name
- Draco biaro Lazell, 1987
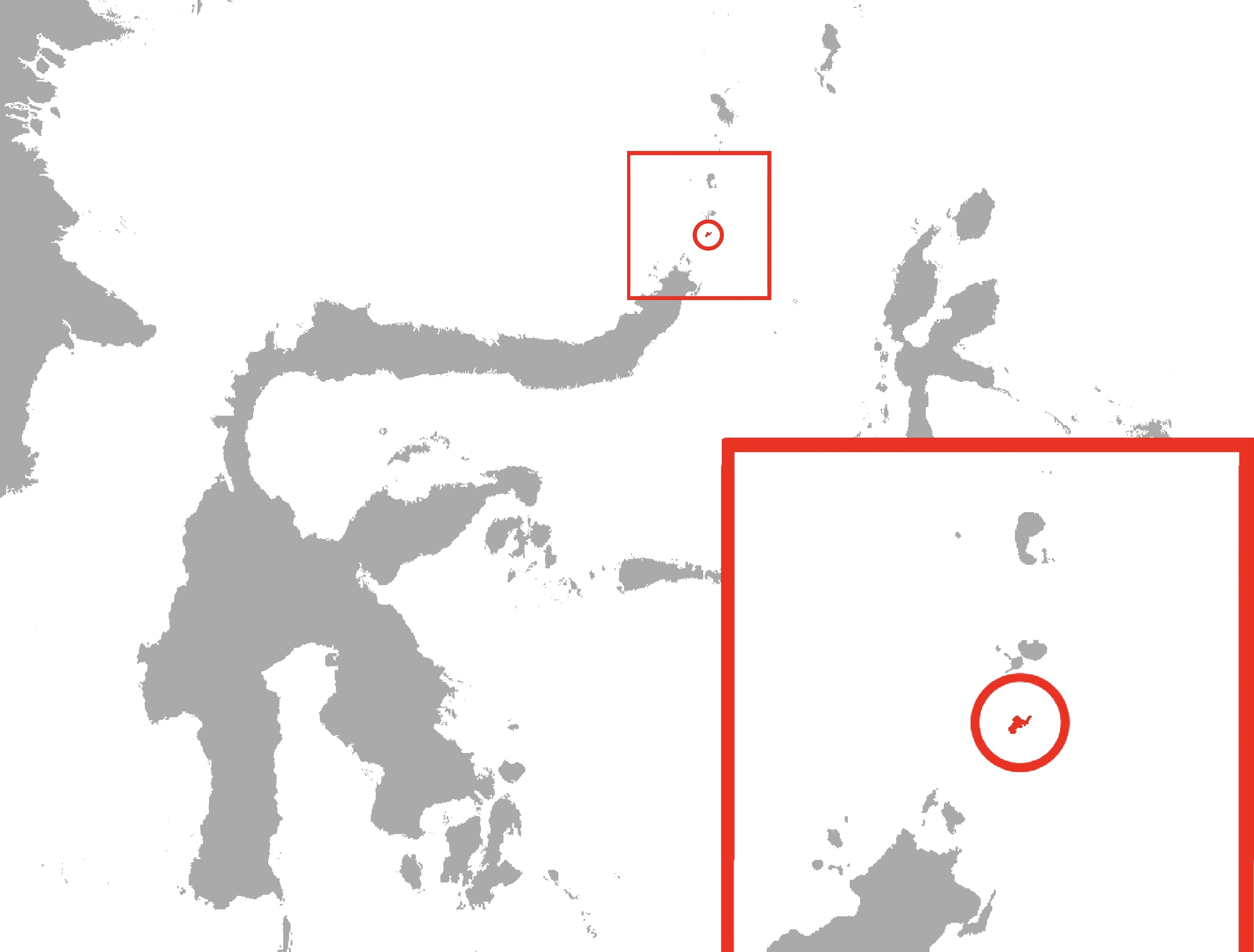

Species of lizard

Draco biaro, also known as the Lazell's flying dragon, is a species of lizard. It is endemic to the Sangihe Islands in North Sulawesi, Indonesia. The type locality is the eponymous Biaro Island. It can be found in lowland rainforests.
