= Draco caerulhians =

Scientific classification
- Kingdom: Animalia
- Phylum: Chordata
- Class: Reptilia
- Order: Squamata
- Suborder: Iguania
- Family: Agamidae
- Genus: Draco
- Species: D. caerulhians

Binomial name
- Draco caerulhians Lazell, 1992
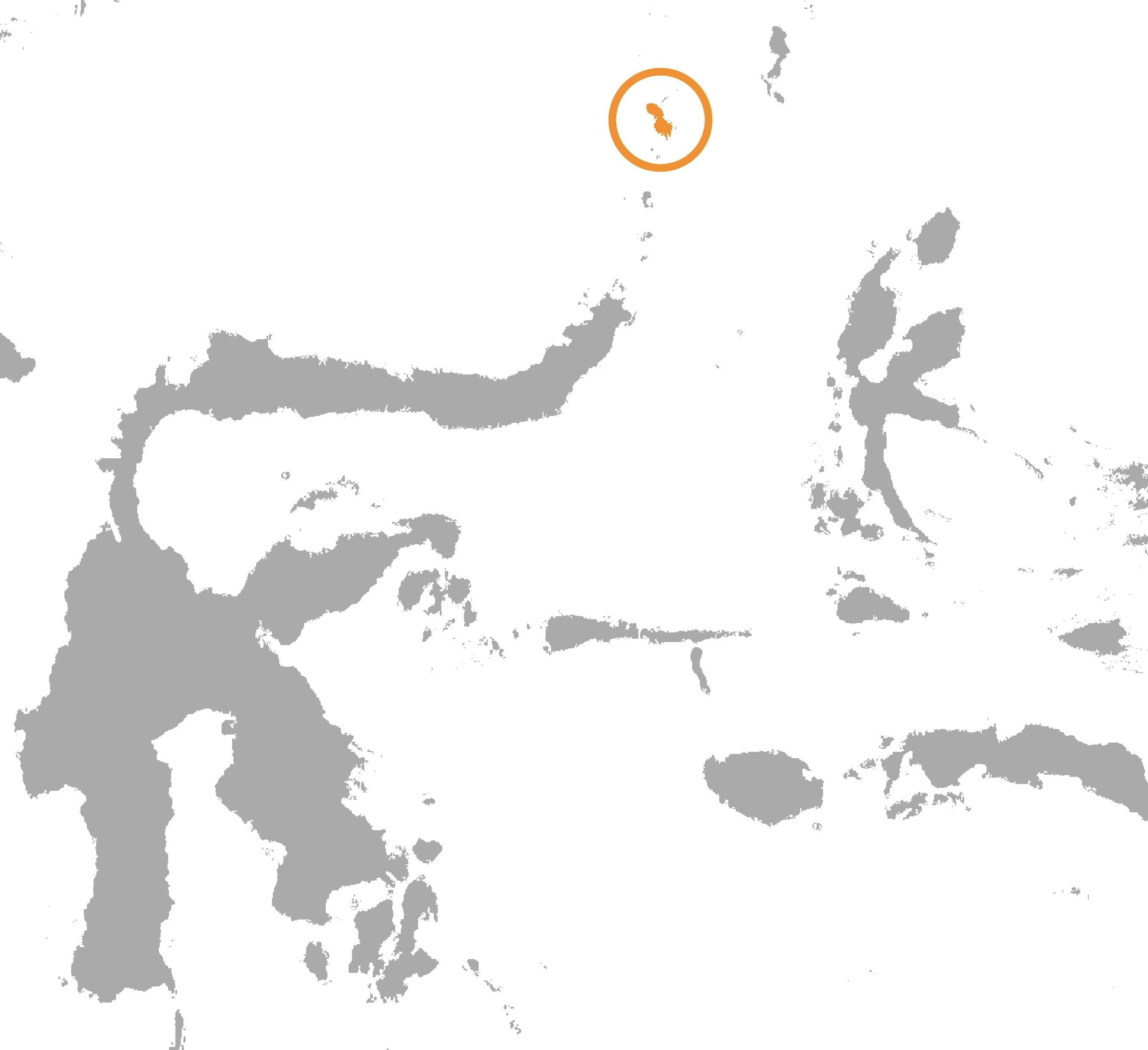

Species of lizard

Draco caerulhians is a species of lizard. It is endemic to Sangir Island in Sulawesi, Indonesia.
