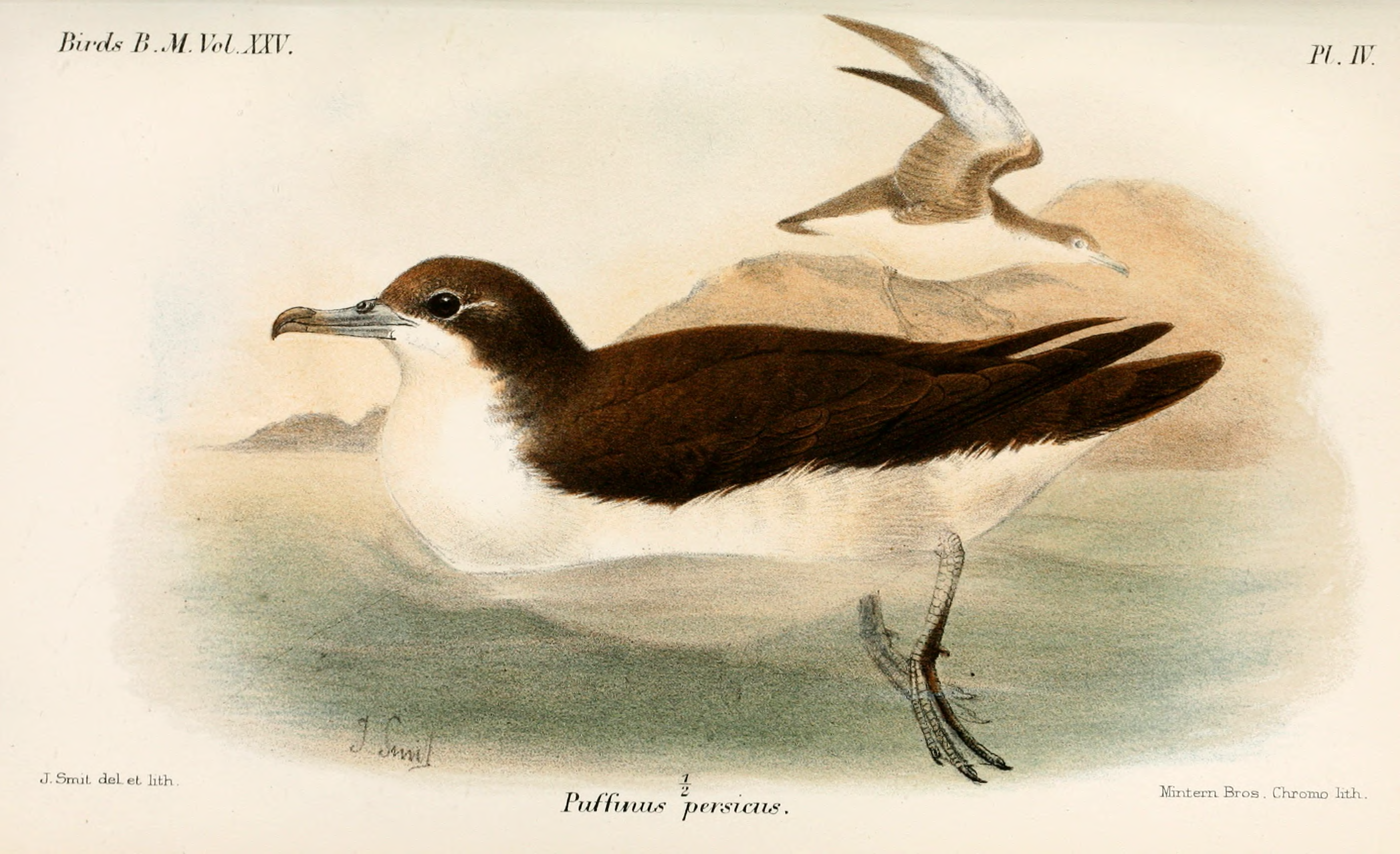
- Puffinus persicus Joseph Smit

Conservation status
- Least Concern (IUCN 3.1)

Scientific classification
- Kingdom: Animalia
- Phylum: Chordata
- Class: Aves
- Order: Procellariiformes
- Family: Procellariidae
- Genus: Puffinus
- Species: P. persicus

Binomial name
- Puffinus persicus Hume, 1872

= Persian shearwater =

Species of bird

The Persian shearwater (Puffinus persicus) is a seabird in the family Procellariidae formerly lumped in with Audubon's shearwater (Puffinus lherminieri).

== Subspecies ==
There are two listed subspecies of the Persian shearwater:

- P. p. persicus – (Hume, 1872): breeds in the Khuriya Muriya Islands, (Oman) & Socotra.
- P. p. temptator – (Louette & Herremans, 1985): breeds in the Comoros.

== Range ==
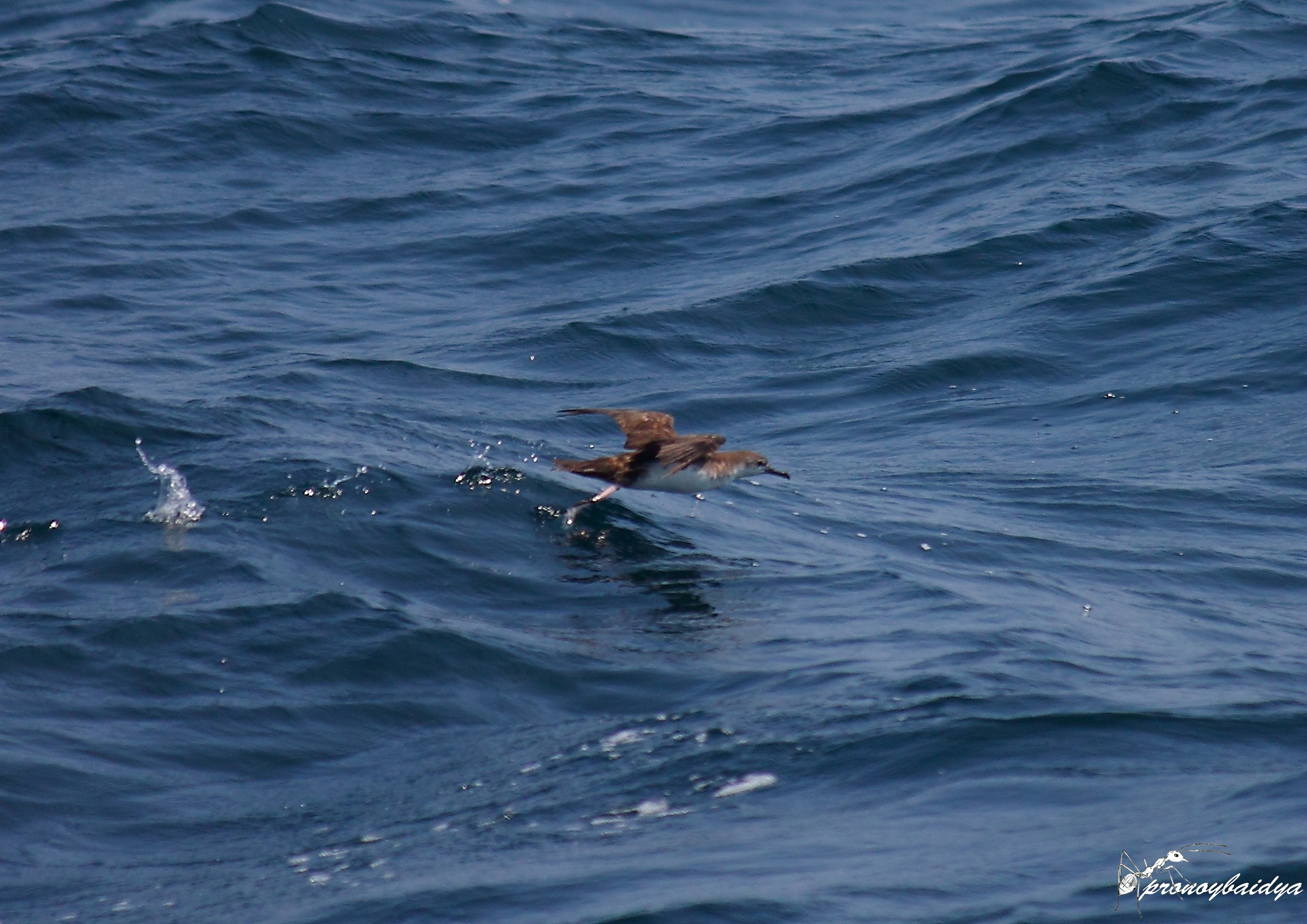
Persian shearwater taking flight off Goa Coast

After breeding, the northern subspecies ranges from the southern Red Sea, the Gulf of Aden and the Somali coast across the south of the Arabian Peninsula to the Gulf of Oman, Pakistan and western India. The southern subspecies stays in the area around the Comoros and the Tanzanian and northern Mozambican coast.

== Population ==
The nominate subspecies is thought to number in the thousands of pairs on the Khuriya Muriya Islands off Oman and Socotra, Yemen, while P. p. temptator has been estimated to number fewer than 500 pairs on Moheli Island in the Comoros (reviewed by Brooke 2004). It is thought likely that more breeding colonies lie undiscovered elsewhere in the northern Indian Ocean (Onley and Scofield 2007), thus the total population probably includes more than 10,000 mature individuals. The population trend is believed to be downwards.
