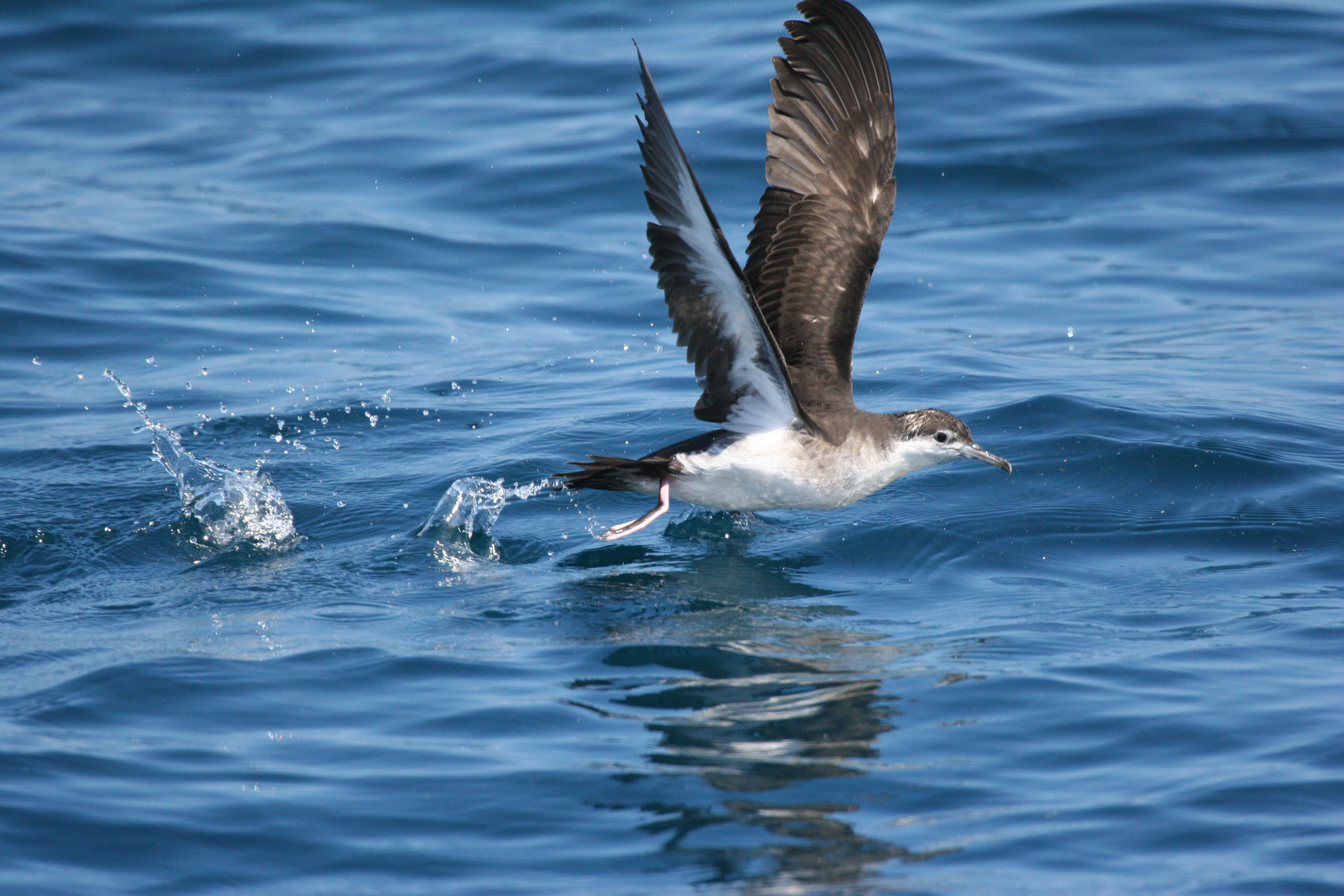
- off Cape Hatteras, North Carolina, USA.

Conservation status
- Least Concern (IUCN 3.1)

Scientific classification
- Kingdom: Animalia
- Phylum: Chordata
- Class: Aves
- Order: Procellariiformes
- Family: Procellariidae
- Genus: Puffinus
- Species: P. lherminieri

Binomial name
- Puffinus lherminieri Lesson, 1839

Subspecies
- 1-2, but see text

Synonyms
- Puffinus assimilis lherminieri Lesson, 1839; Puffinus atrodorsalis Shirihai, Sinclair and Colston, 1995; Pufflnus lherminieri Lesson, 1839 (lapsus) and see text

= Sargasso shearwater =

Species of bird

The Sargasso shearwater (Puffinus lherminieri) is a small tropical seabird in the petrel family. The only shearwater to nest primarily in the Caribbean, it ranges throughout the western Atlantic during the non-breeding season. Its specific epithet honours the French naturalist Félix Louis L'Herminier.

This bird is part of a species complex formerly known as Audubon's shearwater, or occasionally as dusky-backed shearwater. Most authors now separate this complex into a range of species including the Sargasso shearwater, tropical shearwater, Boyd's shearwater, Barolo shearwater, Bannerman's shearwater, and Persian shearwater. These small seabirds form a cryptic species complex which ornithologists have only recently begun to disentangle.

== Description ==
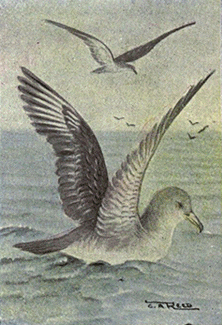
Illustration by Chester A. Reed

The Sargasso shearwater is on average 30 cm (12 in) in length—about half the size of the great shearwater (Puffinus gravis)—and weigh 170 g. There is some variation between populations, and the normal size and weight range is 30–33 cm (12–13 in) and 150–230 g (5.3–8.1 oz). The wingspan is 64 to 72 centimetres (25 to 28 in), the tail is around 8.5 centimetres (3.3 in) long, the exposed culmen measures 3 centimetres (1.2 in) or slightly less, and the tarsus is around 4 centimetres (1.6 in) in length. In general appearance, it is a small shearwater, black above and white below and hard to distinguish from its relatives at first glance.

The upperparts, rectrices and undertail coverts are blackish-brown, as are at least the distal undersides of the remiges, but sometimes the entire feathers. The rest of the underparts are white, as is the head below eye level. The iris is dark, the feet are dull pink with a black wash and black toenails, and the bill is grey, darker towards the tip, and with a pinkish hue.

Males and females look alike. Immature birds do not have a distinct plumage, while the nestlings are covered with down feathers, grey above and whitish on the belly.

It can be confused with the Manx shearwater (P. puffinus), which has white undertail coverts and in direct comparison a longer bill. Other similar-looking species are usually completely allopatric, though the largely subantarctic little shearwater (P. assimilis) may occasionally range into waters where P. lherminieri is normally found. It has more white on the face and underwing, a smaller bill and greyish-blue feet.

Its twittering calls and mewing are often only heard at night in the breeding colonies.

== Range and ecology ==
The Sargasso shearwater breeds primarily on islands in the Caribbean and Lucayan Archipelago. During the non-breeding season, it ranges across the northwestern Atlantic Ocean, particularly along the Gulf Stream and Sargasso Sea.

It is adaptable as regards its preferred marine habitat; it can be found in pelagic, offshore and inshore waters. It feeds in a variety of methods, mainly diving out of flight, plunging underwater from a swimming position, and picking up food less than a bill's length underwater while "pattering" as if it were walking across the waves. It eats small fish, squid and planktonic crustaceans. Unlike other shearwaters, it is not commonly a ship-follower, though it may attend small fishing boats; it is also sometimes met with as part of a mixed-species feeding flock.

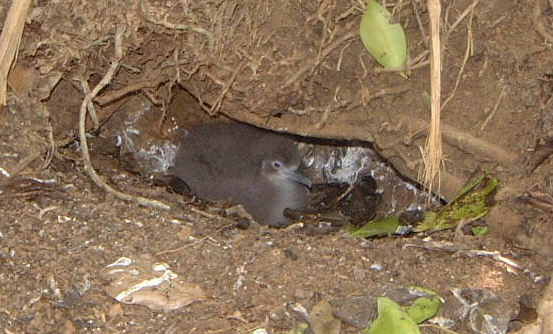
P. lherminieri chick in nest burrow on Little Tobago.

The species is colonial, nesting in small burrows and crevices in rocks and on earthy slopes on atolls and rocky islets. The breeding season varies according to location and subspecies, but how precisely is not very well-studied. Both parents share the responsibility of incubating the single white egg (measurements of 52.5 by 36.2 mm and a weight of 37 g have been recorded for one specimen of average size), each incubating for periods of 2 to 10 days until the egg hatches after 49–51 days of incubation. The nestlings are brooded for half a week to one week, after which time the parents will leave it mostly alone in the burrow and spend most of their time foraging and feeding their voracious offspring, which become very fat. Time from hatching to fledging is 62–75 days. The Sargasso shearwater takes about 8 years to reach breeding age. As typical for Procellariiformes they are long-lived for their size, one bird ringed as an adult was still alive 11 years later; it must have been more than 15 years old at that time.

While some small populations are threatened, the species as a whole (in the present sense, i.e. unsplit) is not considered to be globally threatened.

== Systematics ==
The Sargasso shearwater belongs to the genus Puffinus of mid-sized and small shearwaters. Within Puffinus, the taxonomy of this species has been convoluted. It has traditionally been considered the nominate subspecies of the larger Audubon's shearwater complex, which included up to 10 subspecies. Although of somewhat limited value in procellariiform birds, analysis of mtDNA cytochrome b sequence data indicated that at least three major clades were distinguished within the traditional "Audubon's shearwater" complex. Following further genomic research, the majority of these taxa are now generally considered to comprise their own species, including Sargasso shearwater.

=== The lherminieri clade (Atlantic Ocean, Caribbean) ===
- Sargasso shearwater, Puffinus lherminieri Lesson, 1839 – breeds throughout the Caribbean, on the Bahamas and formerly on Bermuda; ranges throughout the Caribbean and up the North American Atlantic coast up to southern Canada, with vagrants having been recorded off north-eastern Canada. A small breeding colony found in 1993 in the Itatiaia Islands off Vila Velha (Espírito Santo, Brazil) probably belongs to this subspecies. Southern Caribbean birds were separated as P. l. loyemilleri, but are not distinct.
- Barolo shearwater, Puffinus baroli (Bonaparte, 1857) – breeds on the Azores and Canary Islands (east Atlantic); ranges throughout east Atlantic around (but mostly north of) the Tropic of Cancer.
- Boyd's shearwater, Puffinus boydi Mathews, 1912 – breeds on the Cape Verde Islands (east Atlantic); ranges throughout the east Atlantic around (but mostly south of) the Tropic of Cancer.

The former two have more white on the face and bluish feet like the little shearwater, with which they were formerly placed

=== The persicus clade (West Indian Ocean) ===
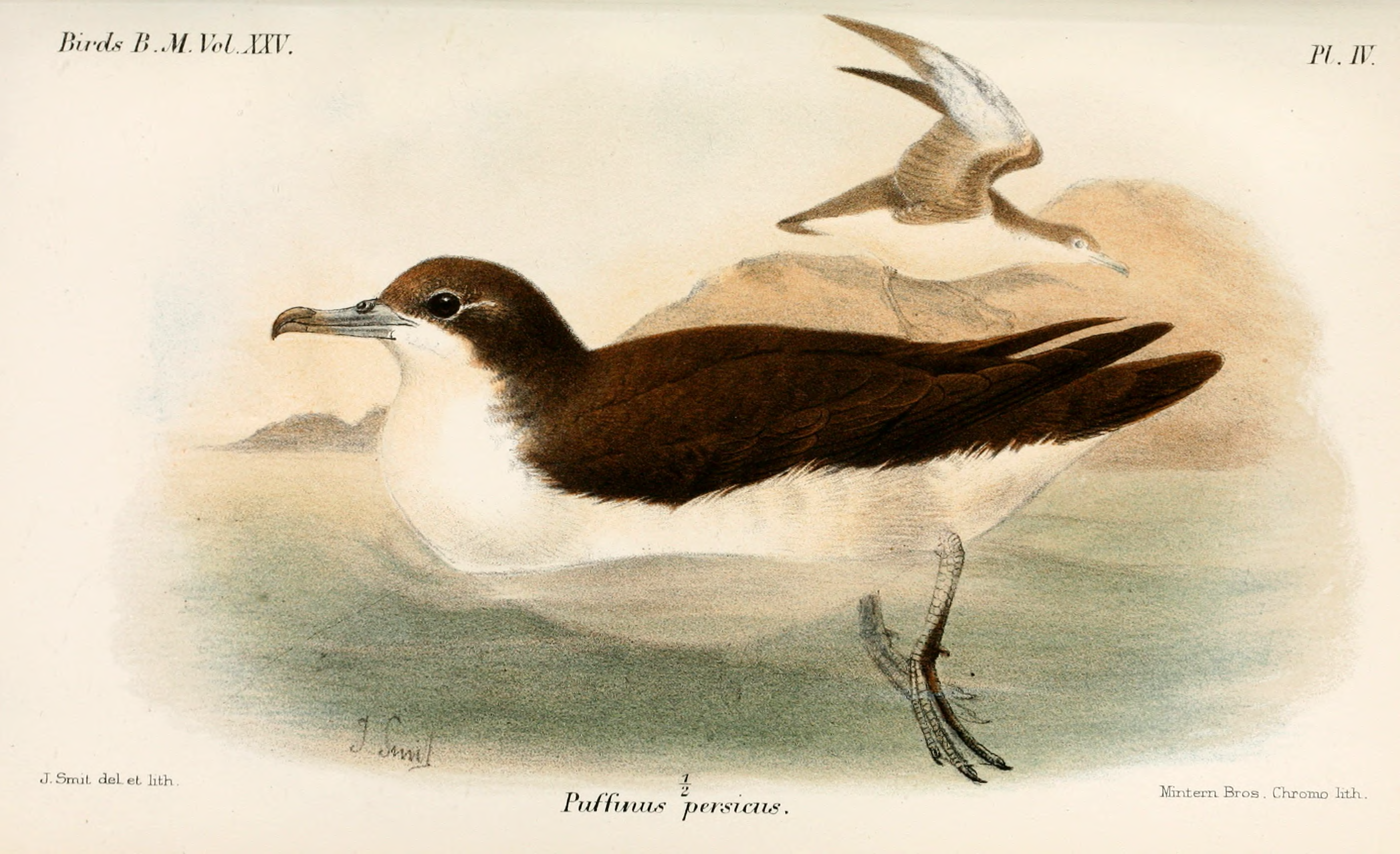
Puffinus persicus

- Persian shearwater, Puffinus persicus Hume, 1837 – breeds on Khuriya Muriya Islands (Arabian Sea); ranges throughout the Arabian Sea.
- Puffinus persicus temptator Louette & Herremans, 1985 – breeds on Mohéli (Comoros); ranges in W Indian Ocean around the northern end of Madagascar.

These form a second distinct clade as indicated by mtDNA sequences, and have for some time been proposed as a distinct species, Persian shearwater (P. persicus). From the molecular data alone, this seems fairly warranted, but the ranges of the two taxa are quite far apart, separated by forms of the third clade. It is quite obvious that on the basis of such contradicting data as presently available, no decision can be taken regarding the taxonomic status of these birds. Possibly, they do form a distinct species separated from the third clade by a different circannual rhythm, as is known from other procellariiform birds. They are phenotypically distinct, with a longer bill, a dark rump, and more extensive dark on the underwing, including some mottling in the normally white area.

If P. bailloni is accepted as a distinct species but P. persicus is not, then this latter group would have to be included in P. bailloni.

=== The bailloni clade (Indian and Pacific oceans) ===
- Tropical shearwater, Puffinus bailloni (Bonaparte, 1857) – breeds on Mascarene Islands (SW Indian Ocean); ranges throughout the SW Indian Ocean to the north of the Tropic of Capricorn, and vagrant birds seen off South Africa probably belong to this subspecies. Includes atrodorsalis.
- Puffinus bailloni dichrous Finsch & Hartlaub, 1867 – breeds throughout central Polynesia and possibly Melanesia (Pacific) and the NW Indian Ocean up to the Arabian Sea; ranges throughout the W Indian Ocean around the Equator, and in the C Pacific from the equatorial region to the Tropic of Capricorn. Includes colstoni, nicolae, polynesiae and maybe gunax; vagrants seen off Australia could belong to dichrous or gunax (if valid), while vagrants recorded from Guam and Rota (Marianas) might be dichrous or bannermani.

This group is the most confusing of all. The subspecies dichrous occurs in two areas which appear to be separated by the whole of Indonesia and the seas surrounding it; the Pacific subpopulation includes the proposed subspecies polynesiae (Ta'ū, American Samoa) and possibly gunax (see below), whereas the geographically separated Indian Ocean subpopulation contains the birds formerly separated as nicolae (NW Indian Ocean, from Aldabra to the Maldives) and colstoni (Aldabra, Arabian Sea).

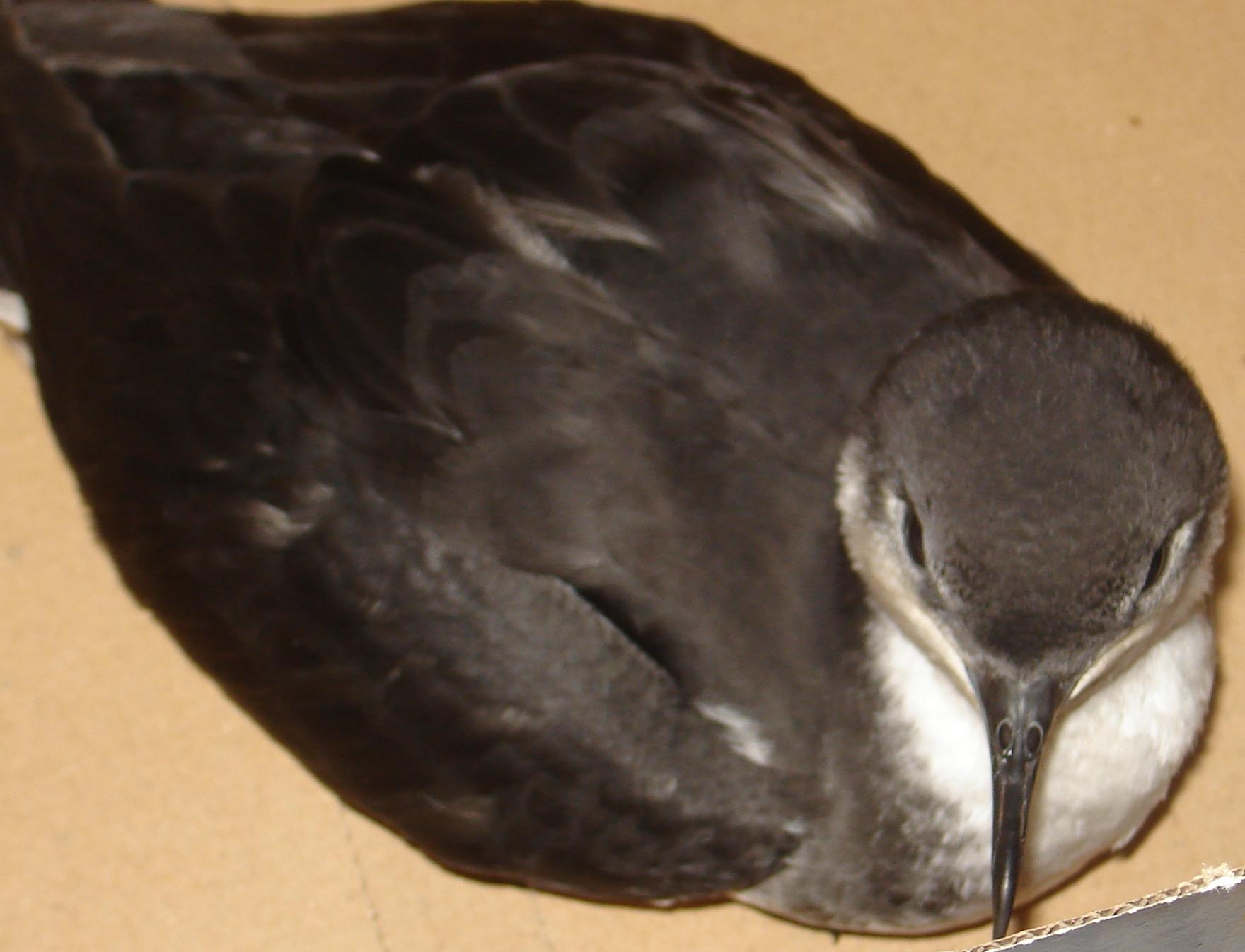
Tropical shearwater Puffinus bailloni of Reunion Island.

There appear to be no significant genetical or morphological differences between these birds, which is quite amazing given that the Pacific and Indian Ocean subpopulations must have been isolated for a fairly long time, and that no less than three unequivocally distinct subspecies (bailloni, persicus and temptator) occur within the range of Indian Ocean dichrous. On the other hand, the supposed species Mascarene shearwater (P. atrodorsalis) is inseparable morphologically and genetically from bailloni.

Clearly, some mechanism blocking gene flow is at work, but what this is exactly remains unknown – though as remarked above, separate breeding seasons seem a reasonable assumption and are tentatively supported by the available field data. In addition, it is entirely mysterious why such a mechanism should apply in the rather limited and ecologically homogeneous north-western Indian Ocean range, but not in the ecologically more diverse and by far larger Pacific range of dichrous.

These unresolved problems notwithstanding, this clade – possibly including the preceding one – is now usually considered a separate species, the tropical shearwater or Baillon's shearwater, Puffinus bailloni.

=== Undetermined ===
- Bannerman's shearwater, Puffinus lherminieri bannermani Mathews & Iredale, 1915 – breeds on Ogasawara Islands (NW Pacific); ranges throughout the NW Pacific from Japanese waters to the equatorial region. Vagrants recorded from Guam and Rota (Marianas) might be dichrous or bannermani.
- Puffinus bailloni gunax Mathews, 1930 – breeds on Banks Islands of Vanuatu (SW Pacific); ranges throughout the SW Pacific between the equatorial region and the Tropic of Capricorn. Might belong in dichrous; vagrants seen off Australia could belong to either taxon.

These taxa could not be included in the most recent studies due to lack of material. The case of gunax seems fairly straightforward – as certainly as this can possibly be said in the absence of new data, it belongs to the bailloni clade either as a distinct subspecies, or, more likely, as yet another synonym of dichrous.

The case of the more distinct bannermani, the range of which is parapatric to that of the Pacific dichrous, is more complicated. It has for some time been proposed as a distinct species, Bannerman's shearwater (P. bannermani). In the absence of more recent data to investigate this claim, its status continues to be altogether unresolved, though the case for it being at least a distinct subspecies in the bailloni clade seems good.

The little-known Heinroth's shearwater (P. heinrothi) was sometimes considered a subspecies of either the Audubon's or the little shearwater complexes. Its actual relationships remain uncertain due to lack of specimens.
