= Dendrelaphis hollinrakei =

Conservation status
- Data Deficient (IUCN 3.1)

Scientific classification
- Kingdom: Animalia
- Phylum: Chordata
- Class: Reptilia
- Order: Squamata
- Suborder: Serpentes
- Family: Colubridae
- Subfamily: Ahaetuliinae
- Genus: Dendrelaphis
- Species: D. hollinrakei

Binomial name
- Dendrelaphis hollinrakei Lazell, 2002

Species of snake

Dendrelaphis hollinrakei is a species of snake in the family Colubridae. The species is endemic to the island of Shek Kwu Chau in China.

== Etymology ==
The specific name, hollinrakei, is in honor of the collector of the holotype, Dr. James Barrie Hollinrake, who was the administrator of Shek Kwu Chau (1971–1984).

== Description ==
D. hollinrakei has 15 rows of dorsal scales at midbody. It has 171 ventrals, and 130 subcaudals.

== Behavior ==
D. hollinrakei is diurnal and fully arboreal.

== Reproduction ==
D. hollinrakei is oviparous.
