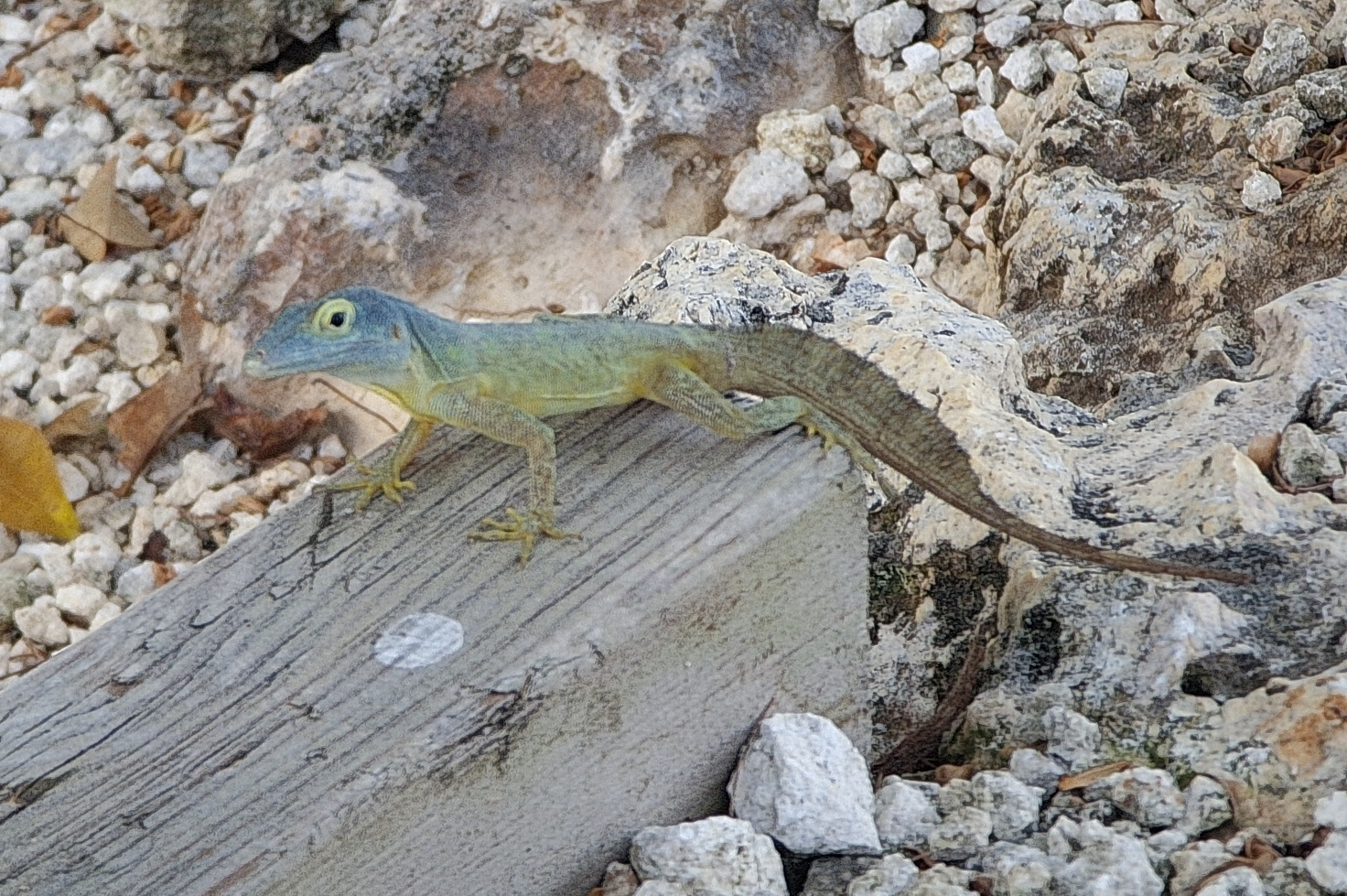

Conservation status
- Least Concern (IUCN 3.1)

Scientific classification
- Kingdom: Animalia
- Phylum: Chordata
- Class: Reptilia
- Order: Squamata
- Suborder: Iguania
- Family: Dactyloidae
- Genus: Anolis
- Species: A. ferreus

Binomial name
- Anolis ferreus (Cope, 1864)

Synonyms
- Xiphosurus ferreus Cope, 1864; Anolis asper Garman, 1887; Anolis ferreus - Underwood, 1959; Anolis marmoratus ferreus Lazell, 1972; Anolis ferreus - Schwartz & Thomas, 1975

= Anolis ferreus =

Species of lizard

Anolis ferreus, the Morne Constant anole, also known as the Marie-Gallant anole, is a species of anole lizard that is endemic to the island of Marie-Galante, which is part of Guadeloupe in the Caribbean Lesser Antilles. It has been recorded as an escapee in Fort Myers, Florida, but does not appear to have become established.

Males can reach 11.9 cm (4.7 in) in snout-to-vent length, while females are significantly smaller, at 6.5 cm (2.6 in). It has a yellow-green dorsal surface, and a blue-gray head with yellow around the eye. Males have prominent tail crests.

It is primarily active during the middle part of the day, retreating to high perches in the late afternoon.

It was formerly considered a subspecies of A. marmoratus.

== See also ==
- List of Anolis lizards
