= Shreve's least gecko =

Conservation status
- Endangered (IUCN 3.1)

Scientific classification
- Kingdom: Animalia
- Phylum: Chordata
- Class: Reptilia
- Order: Squamata
- Suborder: Gekkota
- Family: Sphaerodactylidae
- Genus: Sphaerodactylus
- Species: S. shrevei

Binomial name
- Sphaerodactylus shrevei Lazell, 1961

Species of reptile

Shreve's least gecko (Sphaerodactylus shrevei), also known commonly as the northwest Haiti blotched sphaero and the northwest Haitian blotched geckolet, is an endangered species of lizard in the family Sphaerodactylidae. The species is endemic to Haiti.

== Etymology ==
The specific name, shrevei, is in honor of American herpetologist Benjamin Shreve.

== Habitat ==
The preferred natural habitats of S. shrevei are forest and rocky areas, at altitudes from sea level to 50 m (160 ft).

== Description ==
Dorsally, S. shrevei is ash gray, with a dorsal pattern that is blotched (rather than lineate). Ventrally, it is uniform white. Adult females may attain a snout-to-vent length (SVL) of 30 mm (1.2 in). Adult males are smaller, attaining an SVL of 24 mm (0.94 in).

== Reproduction ==
S. shrevei is oviparous.
