= Anolis ernestwilliamsi =

Conservation status
- Critically Endangered (IUCN 3.1)

Scientific classification
- Kingdom: Animalia
- Phylum: Chordata
- Class: Reptilia
- Order: Squamata
- Suborder: Iguania
- Family: Anolidae
- Genus: Anolis
- Species: A. ernestwilliamsi

Binomial name
- Anolis ernestwilliamsi Lazell, 1983

Synonyms
- Ctenonotus ernestwilliamsi (Lazell, 1983)

Species of lizard

Anolis ernestwilliamsi, also known commonly as the Carrot Rock anole, Carrot Rock's anole, and Ernest's anole, is a species of lizard in the family Dactyloidae. The species is endemic to the British Virgin Islands.

== Taxonomy ==
Anolis ernestwilliamsi was first formally described in 1983 by the American zoologist James D. Lazell Jr., with its type locality given as Carrot Rock, south of Peter Island, in the British Virgin Islands. This species is in the A. cristatellus species complex.

The Carrot Rock anole is very closely related to A. cristatellus, and molecular studies suggest that there is almost no difference in the mitochondrial DNA between A. ernestwilliamsi and haplotypes of other Puerto Rico Bank island populations of A. cristatellus, indicating that the two taxa share a very recent common ancestor. Although A. ernestwilliamsi has a phenotype which is consistently different from other populations of A. cristatellus, this is rather limited, and it has been suggested that there is not enough of a difference, especially in the high degree of genetic similarity. As A. cristatellus is a very variable species, this also supports the idea that this is not a distinct species.

== Etymology ==
The specific name, ernestwilliamsi, is in honor of American herpetologist Ernest Edward Williams.

== Description ==
Anolis ernestwilliamsi is a large member of the A. cristatellus species group, growing to a SVL of at least 82 mm (3.2 in), with smaller scales and larger digital pads than the related species. The colour differs as well; they have a clear black, grey and white barred or reticulated pattern on the chin, which in the males extends onto the front part of the chin flap. Tthere is a bold pattern of pale spots on the upper body, merging to form stripes towards the tail. There is a pale-edged dark bar on each hip.

== Geographic range ==
A. ernestwilliamsi is known only from Carrot Rock, which is an islet south of Peter Island, in the British Virgin Islands.

== Habitat ==
The preferred natural habitat of A. ernestwilliamsi is shrubland, at 6–28 m (20–92 ft) above sea level.

== Behavior ==
A. ernestwilliamsi is terrestrial and saxicolous (rock dwelling).

== Reproduction ==
A. ernestwilliamsi is oviparous.
