= Félix Louis L'Herminier =

French scientist, ornithologist (1779–1833)

Félix Louis L'Herminier (18 May 1779 – 25 October 1833) was a French pharmacist and naturalist born in Paris. His son, Ferdinand Joseph L'Herminier (1802 – 1866), was a botanist and zoologist.

Felix L'Herminier studied chemistry and natural history in Paris, and in 1798 travelled to Guadeloupe, where he spent a number of years studying the island's flora and fauna. For political reasons, in 1815, he was exiled to Saint Barthélemy (then a Swedish possession), later moving to Charleston, South Carolina, where he worked as a curator of natural history in the city museum (1816–1819). Afterwards, he resumed his scientific studies in Guadeloupe prior to returning to France in 1829.

He published several works on ornithology, including a treatise on the role and function of the sternum in birds, titled Recherches sur l'appareil sternal des oiseaux, considéré sous le double rapport de l'ostéologie et la myologie, suivies d'un essai sur la distribution de cette classe de vertébrés (1827).

He has several zoological species named after him, including the Guadeloupe woodpecker (Melanerpes herminieri ), the Martinique curly-tailed lizard (Leiocephalus herminieri ), and Sargasso shearwater (Puffinus lherminieri ).

== Source ==
- This article is based on a translation of an equivalent article at the French Wikipedia.
