= James D. Lazell, Jr. =

American biologist and author (born 1939)

James Draper Lazell, Jr.
- Born: September 5, 1939; New York City, New York, US
- Education: University of the South, University of Illinois, Harvard University, University of Rhode Island
- Known for: Herpetology research, species rediscovery and description
- Scientific career
- Fields: Biology, Herpetology, Mammalogy
- Workplaces: Massachusetts Audubon Society, Museum of Comparative Zoology, National Park Service

James Draper Lazell, Jr. (born 5 September 1939) is an American biologist and nonfiction author. His research focuses on herpetology and mammalogy.

== Biography ==
Lazell is the son of James Draper Lazell, Sr., a businessman, and Katee Quin Lazell, a porcelain restorer. He grew up in a suburb of Philadelphia. He earned a Bachelor of Arts at the University of the South in Sewanee, Tennessee in 1961, a Master of Science at the University of Illinois in 1963, and a Master of Arts at Harvard University in 1966. He received his Ph.D. in 1970 from the University of Rhode Island (URI) with a dissertation on Anolis species of the West Indies. In 1970, he became a research associate at the Massachusetts Audubon Society. From 1966 to 1974, he was a science teacher and department head at the Palfrey Street School in Watertown, Massachusetts. In 1969, he joined the National Park Service and also worked as a herpetologist at the Museum of Comparative Zoology. At age 17, Lazell undertook his first expedition to the West Indies, funded by the Philadelphia Zoo, collecting various Anolis species. Between 1957 and 2014, he visited the West Indies annually. On Guana Island in the British Virgin Islands, he conducted a long-term 30-year study.

In 1962, he rediscovered Erythrolamprus cursor, a snake previously thought extinct on Martinique. He described over 30 animal species, including 15 reptiles: Anolis chrysops, Anolis desiradei, Anolis ernestwilliamsi, Anolis kahouannensis, Anolis orcesi, Anolis pogus, Anolis schwartzi, Boa nebulosa, Dendrelaphis hollinrakei, Draco biaro, Draco caerulhians, Draco jareckii, Sphaerodactylus kirbyi, Sphaerodactylus shrevei, and Spondylurus macleani. In 1984, he described Hefner's Florida Key rabbit (Sylvilagus floridanus hefneri), naming it after Hugh Hefner. He is a member of the American Society of Ichthyologists and Herpetologists, American Society of Mammalogists, American Society of Zoologists, American Association for the Advancement of Science, Federation of American Scientists, the Sierra Club, Zero Population Growth, and the Philadelphia Zoological Society. In 1980, he founded the conservation organization The Conservation Agency.

== Personal life ==
In 1988, Lazell met Chinese entomologist Wenhua Lu, whom he married in 1992. Wenhua also earned her Ph.D. at URI. The couple has no children; Lazell underwent a vasectomy at age 21.

== Eponymous species ==
Species named in his honor include:

- Gehyra lazelli Wells & Wellington, 1985
- Indotyphlops lazelli Wallach & Pauwels, 2004
- Sphaerodactylus lazelli Shreve, 1968

== Selected publications ==
- The Anoles (Sauria: Iquaridae) of the Lesser Antilles. Harvard University, Museum of Comparative Zoology, 1972.
- Reptiles and Amphibians in Massachusetts. Massachusetts Audubon Society, 1972.
- This Broken Archipelago: Cape Cod and the Islands, Amphibians and Reptiles. Quadrangle, 1976.
- Wildlife of the Florida Keys: A Natural History. Island Press, 1989.
- (with John Alexander) Ribbons of Sand: The Amazing Convergence of the Ocean and the Outer Banks. Algonquin Books, 1992.
- Island – Fact and Theory in Nature. University of California Press, 2005.
