= Sphaerodactylus kirbyi =

Conservation status
- Vulnerable (IUCN 3.1)

Scientific classification
- Kingdom: Animalia
- Phylum: Chordata
- Class: Reptilia
- Order: Squamata
- Suborder: Gekkota
- Family: Sphaerodactylidae
- Genus: Sphaerodactylus
- Species: S. kirbyi

Binomial name
- Sphaerodactylus kirbyi Lazell, 1994

Species of lizard

Sphaerodactylus kirbyi, commonly known as the Bequia dwarf gecko, the Bequia sphaero, or the Grenadines sphaero, is a species of gecko, a lizard in the family Sphaerodactylidae. The species is endemic to Bequia, an island in the Grenadines that is part of Saint Vincent and the Grenadines.

== Etymology ==
The specific name, kirbyi, is in honor of Dr. Ian Earle Ayrton Kirby (1921–2006), who was a government veterinarian and naturalist on St. Vincent.

== Description ==
S. kirbyi reaches a snout-to-vent length (SVL) of 25 mm (0.98 in). It is gray-brown, occasionally with a yellowish tint on its chin, throat, and the sides of its neck. The underside of its tail is mottled with orange. It has irregular small blotches on its body, and faded stripes on its head. A gray inverse V-shape extends from its hind limbs to the base of its tail.

== Reproduction ==
S. kirbyi is oviparous.
