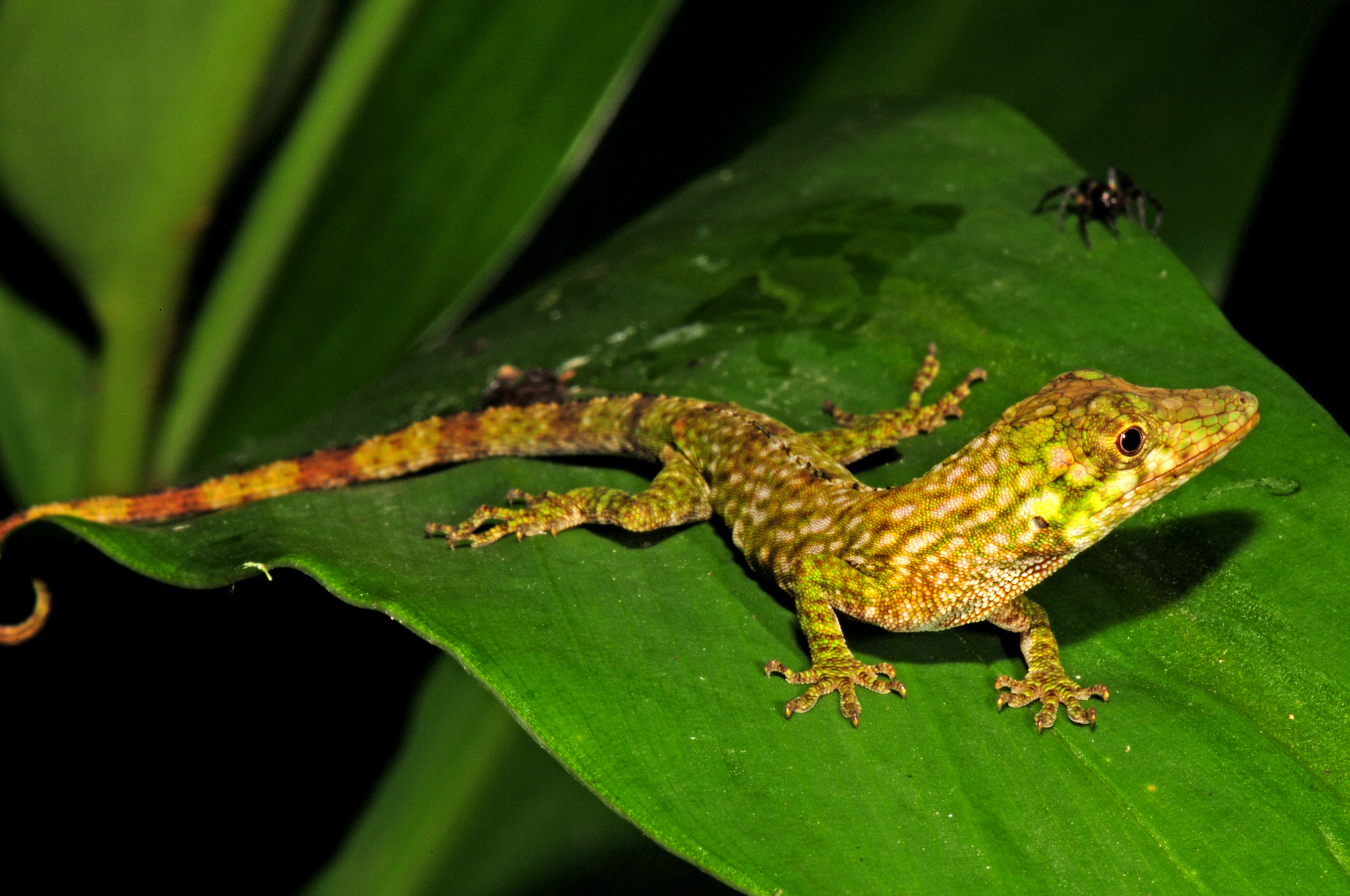

Conservation status
- Near Threatened (IUCN 3.1)

Scientific classification
- Kingdom: Animalia
- Phylum: Chordata
- Class: Reptilia
- Order: Squamata
- Suborder: Iguania
- Family: Anolidae
- Genus: Anolis
- Species: A. orcesi

Binomial name
- Anolis orcesi (Lazell, 1969)

Synonyms
- Phenacosaurus orcesi Lazell, 1969; Dactyloa orcesi (Lazell, 1969)

= Anolis orcesi =

Species of lizard

Anolis orcesi, also known commonly as Orces' Andes anole or Orces's Andes anole, is a species of lizard in the family Dactyloidae. The species is native to Ecuador.

== Etymology ==
The specific name, orcesi, is in honor of Ecuadorian herpetologist Gustavo Orcés.

== Description ==
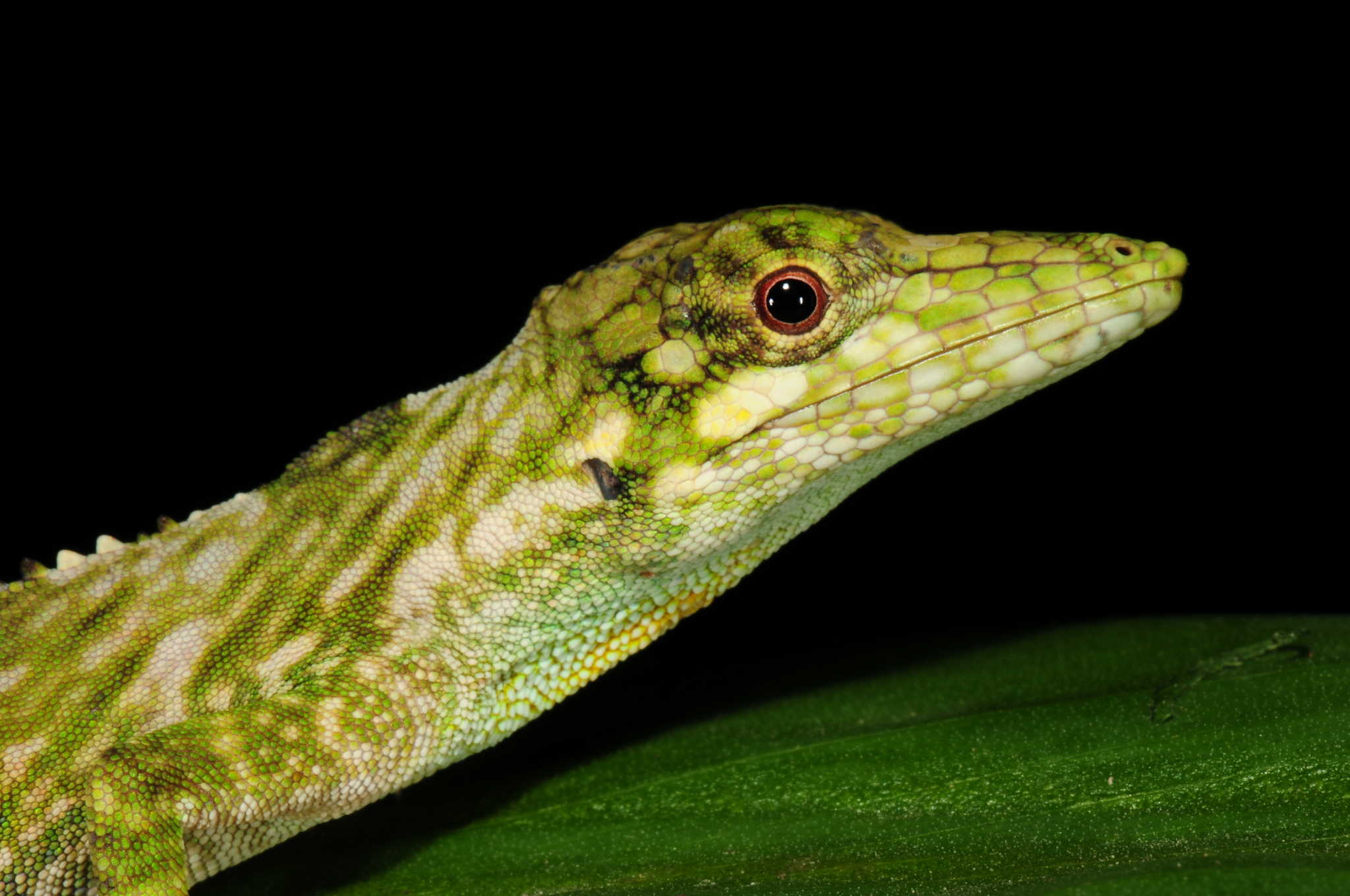
Close up view of head and eye

== Geographic distribution ==
Anolis orcesi is found in Napo Province, Ecuador, on the eastern slopes of the Andes.

== Habitat ==
The preferred natural habitat of Anolis orcesi is forest, at elevations of 1,510–1,768 m (4,954–5,801 ft).

== Behavior ==
Anolis orcesi is arboreal, perching on branches above 2 m (6.6 ft) but below the forest canopy.

== Reproduction ==
Anolis orcesi is oviparous.
