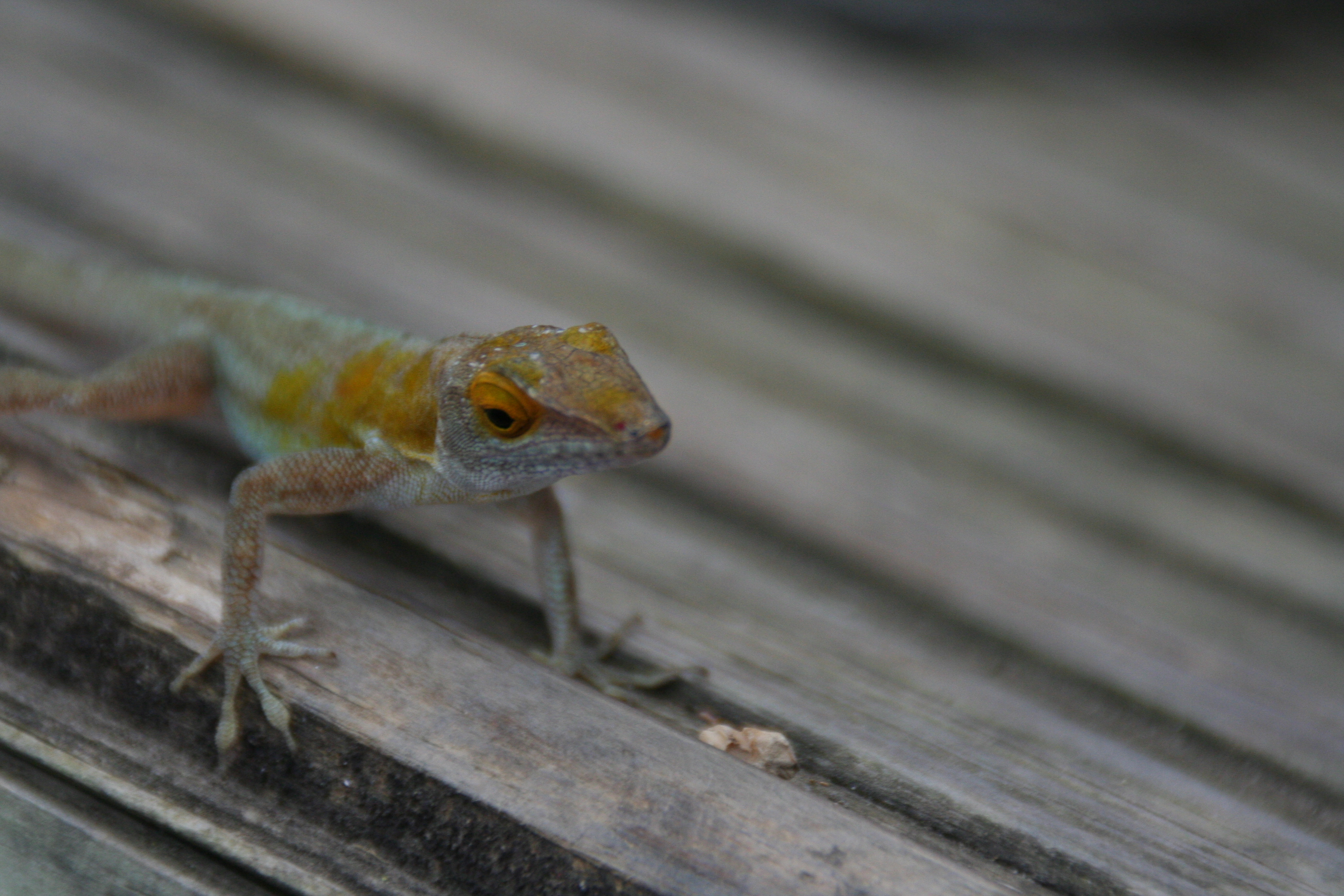

Conservation status
- Least Concern (IUCN 3.1)

Scientific classification
- Kingdom: Animalia
- Phylum: Chordata
- Class: Reptilia
- Order: Squamata
- Suborder: Iguania
- Family: Dactyloidae
- Genus: Anolis
- Species: A. terraealtae

Binomial name
- Anolis terraealtae Barbour, 1915

Synonyms
- Anolis marmoratus terraealtae Lazell, 1964; Ctenonotus marmoratus terraealtae Schwartz & Henderson, 1988

= Anolis terraealtae =

Species of lizard

Anolis terraealtae, the Les Saines anole or Les Saintes anole, (Anoli des Saintes in French) is a species of anole lizard endemic to the Îles des Saintes, islands in Guadeloupe in the Caribbean.

It was formerly described as a subspecies of A. marmoratus.
