= Anolis desiradei =

Conservation status
- Least Concern (IUCN 3.1)

Scientific classification
- Kingdom: Animalia
- Phylum: Chordata
- Class: Reptilia
- Order: Squamata
- Suborder: Iguania
- Family: Anolidae
- Genus: Anolis
- Species: A. desiradei

Binomial name
- Anolis desiradei Lazell, 1964

Species of lizard

Anolis desiradei, the La Desirade anole, is a species of lizard in the family Dactyloidae. The species is found on La Désirade in Guadeloupe.
