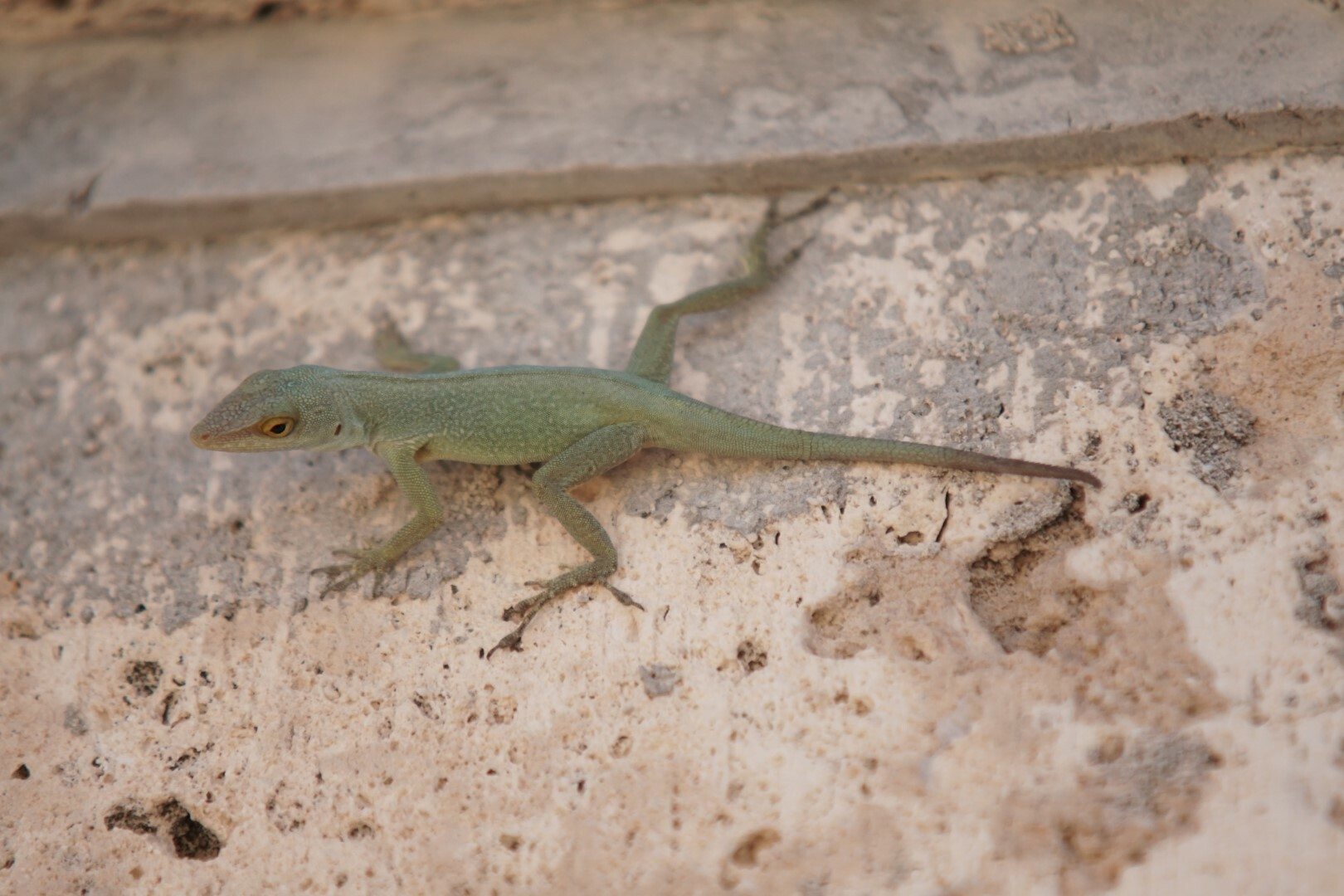

Scientific classification
- Kingdom: Animalia
- Phylum: Chordata
- Class: Reptilia
- Order: Squamata
- Suborder: Iguania
- Family: Anolidae
- Genus: Anolis
- Species: A. chrysops

Binomial name
- Anolis chrysops Lazell, 1964

= Anolis chrysops =

Species of lizard

Anolis chrysops is a species of lizard in the family Dactyloidae. The species is found on the Petite Terre Islands in Guadeloupe.
