= Anolis shrevei =

Conservation status
- Near Threatened (IUCN 3.1)

Scientific classification
- Kingdom: Animalia
- Phylum: Chordata
- Class: Reptilia
- Order: Squamata
- Suborder: Iguania
- Family: Anolidae
- Genus: Anolis
- Species: A. shrevei

Binomial name
- Anolis shrevei (Cochran, 1939)

Species of lizard

Anolis shrevei, the Cordillera central stout anole or Shreve's anole, is a species of lizard in the family Dactyloidae. The species is found in the Dominican Republic.
