= Dependencies of Guadeloupe =

Coordinates: 16°00′N 61°18′W

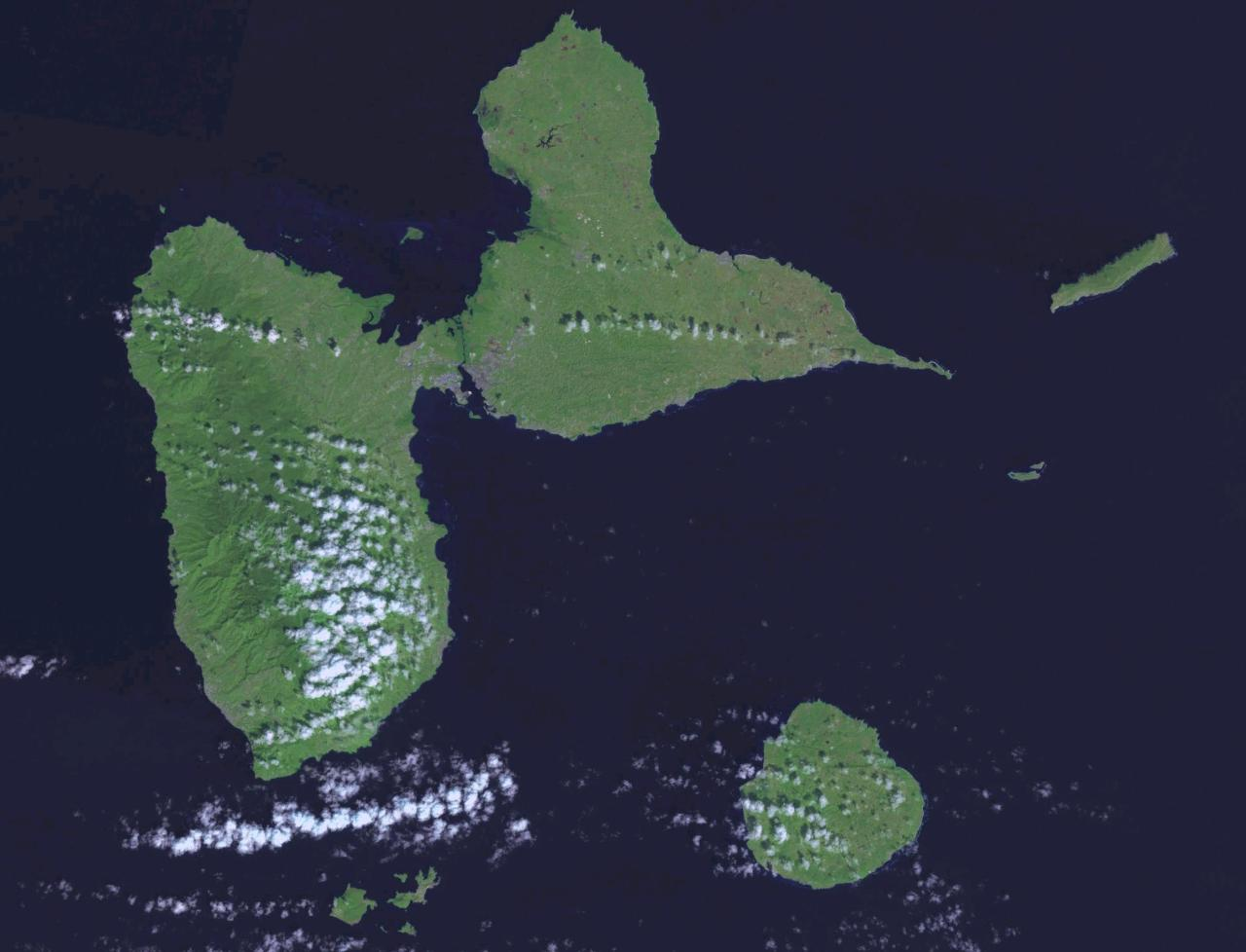
Guadeloupe island and its dependencies: les Saintes, Marie-Galante, La Désirade

The dependencies of Guadeloupe are three islands or island groups in the Leeward Islands chain which are administratively part of the neighboring French overseas department of Guadeloupe in the French Lesser Antilles. They are nearby island entities to the south and east of Guadeloupe island. Saint-Barthélemy and the French side of Saint-Martin were dependencies of Guadeloupe before they became autonomous. There are now three dependencies:

- Îles des Saintes
- Marie-Galante
- La Désirade

In order to distinguish them from the former dependencies to the north (Saint-Barthélemy and Saint-Martin), they are known as the southern islands of Guadeloupe. The unofficial expressions Archipelago of Guadeloupe and Islands of Guadeloupe, which remain only an administrative reality, serve to differentiate the department of Guadeloupe (the French institutional entity including Guadeloupe island and its dependencies) and the two islands of Guadeloupe itself.

== Status and Administration ==
From their incorporation into Guadeloupe, the dependencies benefit from their departmental status and are integrated under the terms of the French policy of assimilation into the French territory according to the 73rd article of the French Constitution. They are also integrated as ultra peripherals regions of the European Union.

According to the Constitution of the French Fifth Republic and the guidance law for overseas or Paul's Law (March 18, 2000) established by Congress, every dependency has the choice of upgrading to an overseas collectivity in the 74th article of the French Constitution and to free itself from the Guadeloupean administration if their elected representatives should make the request.

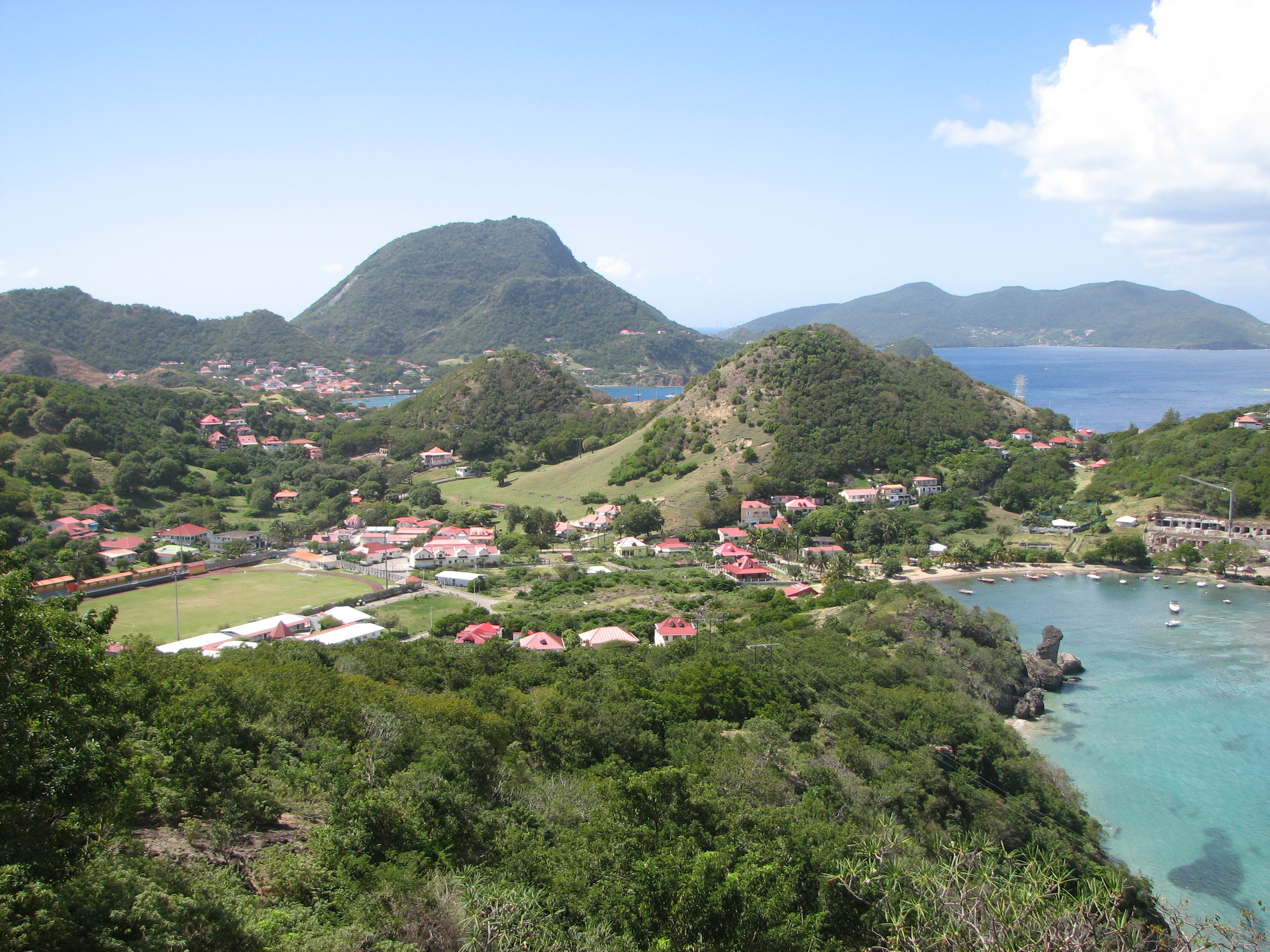
Marigot bay (Terre-de-Haut)les Saintes

These islands are first divided into cantons, then subdivided into communes, including the two arrondissements and three of the four constituencies (circonscriptions in French) of the French overseas department of Guadeloupe. As Guadeloupe is an integral part of France, the inhabitants of the islands enjoy full French citizenship.

== Economic situation analysis ==
In spite of an enormous tourist potential, the economies of the dependencies are not strong. The majority of tourists to Guadeloupe favor a one-day hike visit to the islands instead of a full stay. Only les Saintes, which welcomes cruise and yacht tourism, has independent tourism. The economies of the islands are mainly based on fishing, craft and tourism, each to different degrees on each dependency. Only Marie-Galante possesses an agricultural economy, by cultivating sugar cane and producing rum. This sector is particularly in crisis.

The departmental system freezes and causes the economic dynamism of the dependencies to run out of steam. The double insularity provoked by their incorporation into Guadeloupe slows down their development, which remain enclosed, in spite of the enforcement of the French law of territorial continuity. The absence of a training establishment, centralized in Guadeloupe island, the low rate of new business start-ups, the expensive living costs, and the heavy tax system increase the number of unemployed who are obliged to exodus towards Guadeloupe or metropolitan France to find a job, causing the fast depopulation of these islands.

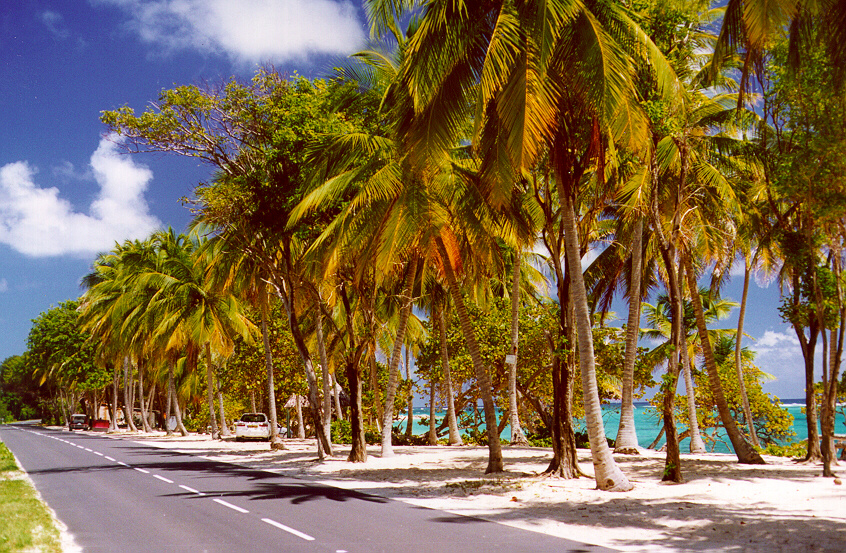
Road of Marie-Galante.

== Politics ==
The current political system of the dependencies is strongly inclined towards Guadeloupean politics. On December 7, 2003, the dependencies in the department of Guadeloupe participated in a referendum on the institutional evolution of that French overseas department and rejected it by a majority voting "no".

During the 2009 French Caribbean general strikes, the supply of stores was badly perturbed, as in other places in Guadeloupe, but these strikes were mostly concerning small and medium enterprises (SMEs) (weakly presented on these islands), and maritime transport companies were forced to set aside some gas and oil to ensure most connections.

At the end of the conflict French president Nicolas Sarkozy declared the opening of the États-Généraux de l'Outre-mer (literally, "Estates general of French overseas"). Several study groups were created among which one was concerning local governance, brought to conceive an institutional modification project or to declare a new status for Guadeloupe with or without the emancipation of its last dependencies. The conferences of the "southern islands" (Marie Galante, les Saintes and la Désirade) were opened in parallel. Problems common to these islands were exposed in six study groups: equality of opportunity, territorial continuity, local governance, local economic development and development of activity and tourism.

On May 12, 2009, the French overseas Minister, Yves Jégo, at the end of these conferences, came for an official visit to les Saintes for the seminary of the dependencies of Guadeloupe. He took into account the identical realities and the political hopes of these islands, to improve territorial continuity, to reduce effects of the double-insularity, abolition of Guadeloupean dependence, national representation, development of labor pool attractiveness, the fight against depopulation, the tax system, and the cost of living. He announced the signature of a contract, "COLIBRI" (Contract for the Employment and the Local Initiatives in the Regional Pond of the Southern Islands of Guadeloupe; literally "hummingbird"), a convention for the Grouping of Public Interest for Arrangement and Development (G.I.P.A.D) and a finalized proposition of statutory evolution.

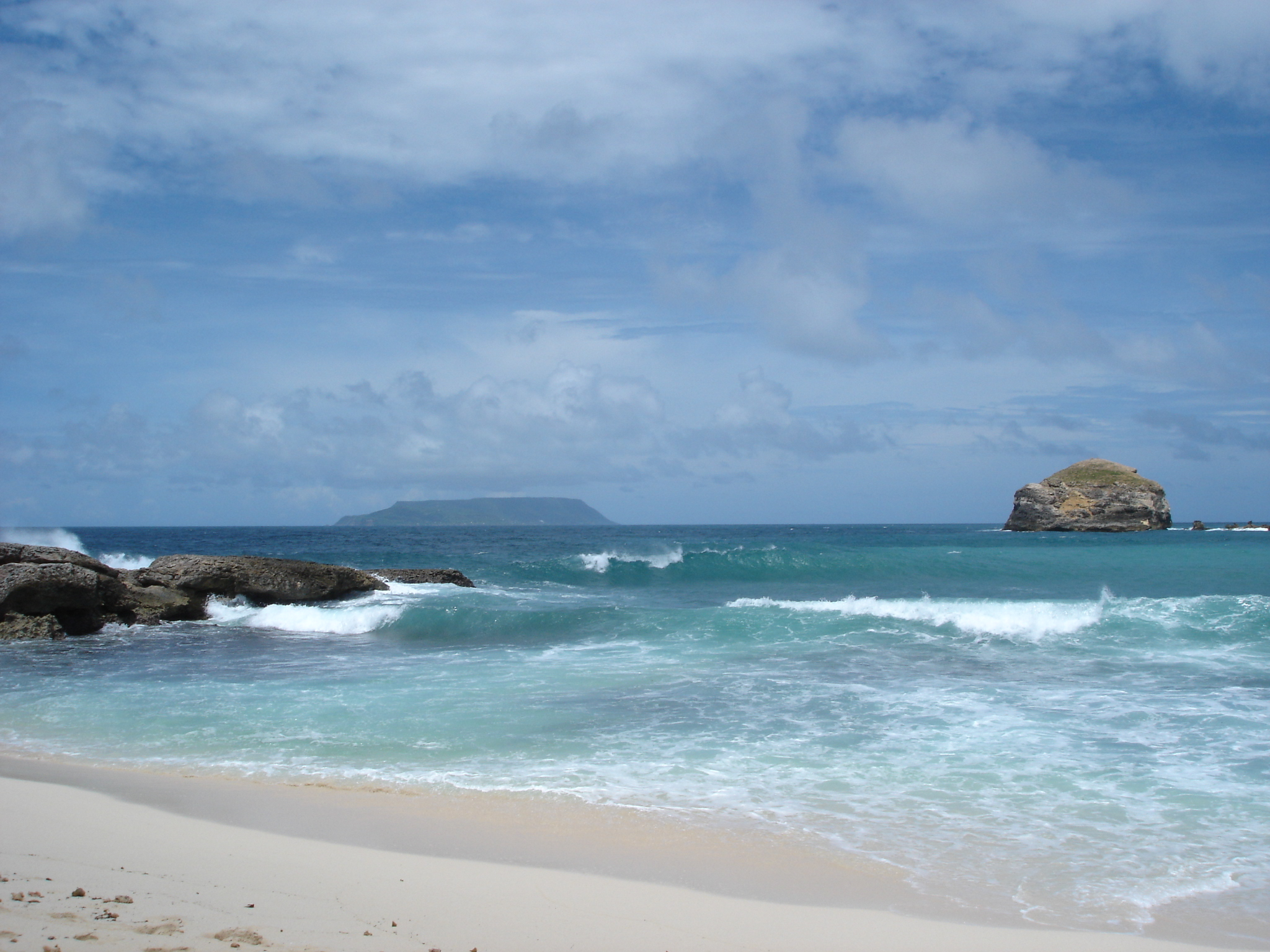
View of La Désirade from the east coast of Grande-Terre, Guadeloupe, showing the central plateau of La Désirade.

Les Saintes, like Marie-Galante, aspires for the creation of overseas collectivities for each entity of the southern islands or one which encompasses the three dependencies, similar to the reorganization of the former northern islands of Guadeloupe (Saint-Barthélemy and Saint-Martin). Nevertheless, Marie-Luce Penchard, the current French minister for overseas territories, has not pressed the issue.

== See also ==
- îles des Saintes
- Marie-Galante
- la Désirade
- Guadeloupe
- French Antilles
- Overseas department
