= Index of Guadeloupe-related articles =

The location of the French overseas department of Guadeloupe

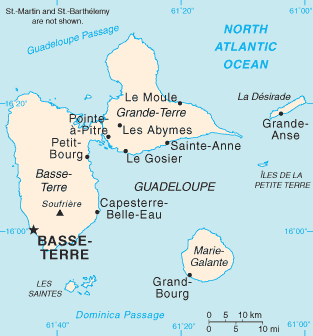
A map of Guadeloupe

Articles related to the French overseas department of Guadeloupe include:

== 0–9 ==
- .gp – Internet country code top-level domain for Guadeloupe
- 1899 Hurricane San Ciriaco
- 1928 Okeechobee hurricane
- 2009 French Caribbean general strikes

== A ==
- Air Antilles Express
- Air Caraïbes Atlantique
- Air Caraïbes
- Airports in Guadeloupe
- Amphicyclotulus perplexus
- Americas
  - North America
    - North Atlantic Ocean
      - West Indies
        - Mer des Caraïbes (Caribbean Sea)
          - Antilles (Antilles)
            - Petites Antilles (Lesser Antilles)
              - Islands of Guadeloupe
- Anse-Bertrand
- Antillean fruit-eating bat
- Antillean nighthawk
- Arrondissement of Basse-Terre
- Arrondissement of Pointe-à-Pitre
- Arrondissements of the Guadeloupe department
- Atlas of Guadeloupe
- Avicennia germinans

== B ==
- Baie-Mahault
- Baillif
- Balakadri
- Barbados–France relations
- Basse-Terre on Île de Basse-Terre – Capital of Guadeloupe
- Basse-Terre 1st Canton
- Basse-Terre 2nd Canton
- Basse-Terre Cathedral
- Basse-Terre Island
- Biguine
- Black-rumped waxbill
- Boisripeau
- Boisvin
- Bouillante
- Boula (music)
- Invasion of Guadeloupe (1759), 1758–1759

== C ==
- Camaz 89
- Canton of Anse-Bertrand
- Canton of Baie-Mahault
- Canton of Bouillante
- Canton of Capesterre-de-Marie-Galante
- Canton of Gourbeyre
- Canton of Goyave
- Canton of Grand-Bourg
- Canton of La Désirade
- Canton of Lamentin
- Canton of Les Saintes
- Canton of Petit-Bourg
- Canton of Petit-Canal
- Canton of Pointe-Noire
- Canton of Saint-Claude
- Canton of Saint-François
- Canton of Saint-Louis
- Canton of Trois-Rivières
- Canton of Vieux-Habitants
- Cantons of the Guadeloupe department
- Capesterre-Belle-Eau 1st Canton
- Capesterre-Belle-Eau 2nd Canton
- Capesterre-Belle-Eau
- Capesterre-de-Marie-Galante
- Capital of Guadeloupe: Basse-Terre on Île de Basse-Terre
- Carbet Falls
- Caribbean
- Caribbean Carnival
- Caribbean Sea
- Categories:
  - Category:Guadeloupe
    - Category:Buildings and structures in Guadeloupe
    - Category:Communications in Guadeloupe
    - Category:Economy of Guadeloupe
    - Category:Environment of Guadeloupe
    - Category:Geography of Guadeloupe
    - Category:Guadeloupe stubs
    - Category:Guadeloupean culture
    - Category:Guadeloupean people
    - Category:Guadeloupe-related lists
    - Category:History of Guadeloupe
    - Category:Politics of Guadeloupe
    - Category:Society of Guadeloupe
    - Category:Sport in Guadeloupe
    - Category:Transport in Guadeloupe
  - commons:Category:Guadeloupe
- Cedrela odorata
- Chassaing
- Chazeau
- Coat of arms of Guadeloupe
- Coat of arms of Guadeloupe
- Colonial and Departmental Heads of Guadeloupe
- Communes of the Guadeloupe department
- Communications in Guadeloupe
- Communications in Guadeloupe
- Conchou
- Confédération générale du travail de Guadeloupe

== D ==
- Damoiseau Rhum
- Daniel Marsin
- Demographics of Guadeloupe
- Deshaies
- Doc Gynéco
- Dominica Passage
- Dominique Vian
- Dubedou

== E ==
- Eastern Caribbean Gas Pipeline Company Limited
- Economy of Guadeloupe
- Elections in Guadeloupe
- Extinct animals of Martinique and Guadeloupe

== F ==
The Flag of France

- Félix Éboué
- Flag of France
- Flag of Guadeloupe
- Fonds d'Or
- Fort Napoléon des Saintes
- France
- French America
- French colonization of the Americas
- French language
- French overseas department of Guadeloupe
- French Republic (République française)
- French West Indies

== G ==
- Gardel, Guadeloupe
- Geography of Guadeloupe
- Giant ditch frog
- Gourbeyre
- Goyave
- Grand-Bourg
- Grande-Terre island
- Guadeloupe (Région Guadeloupe)
- Guadeloupe, adjective
- Guadeloupe films
- Guadeloupe franc
- Guadeloupe livre
- Guadeloupe national football team
- Guadeloupe National Park
- Guadeloupe Passage
- Guadeloupe raccoon
- Guadeloupe woodpecker
- Guadeloupean, citizen of Guadeloupe
- Guenette
- Gwo ka

== H ==
- Hinduism in Guadeloupe
- History of Guadeloupe
- Hurricane Allen
- Hurricane Betsy (1956)
- Hurricane Cleo
- Hurricane Hortense
- Hurricane Hugo
- Hurricane Inez
- Hurricane Lenny
- Hurricane Luis

== I ==
- Hégésippe Ibéné
- Îles des Saintes
- International Organization for Standardization (ISO)
  - ISO 3166-1 alpha-2 country code for Guadeloupe: GP
  - ISO 3166-1 alpha-3 country code for Guadeloupe: GLP
- Islands of Guadeloupe:
  - Basse-Terre
  - La Désirade
  - Grande-Terre
  - Marie-Galante
  - Iles de la Petite Terre
  - Iles des Saintes
    - Terre-de-Haut
    - Terre-de-Bas

== J ==
- Jabrun, Guadeloupe
- Jabrun-du-Sud
- Jean-Marc Mormeck
- Jean-Paul Proust

== K ==
- Kahouanne

== L ==
- La Berthaudiere
- La Democratie Sociale
- La Désirade (commune)
- La Désirade
- La Goguette
- La Grande Soufrière
- La Rosette
- Lamentin
- Laura Flessel-Colovic
- Lauranza Doliman
- Laureal
- Le Gosier 1st Canton
- Le Gosier 2nd Canton
- Le Gosier
- Le Moule 1st Canton
- Le Moule 2nd Canton
- Le Moule
- Lemercier, Guadeloupe
- Les Abymes 1st Canton
- Les Abymes 2nd Canton
- Les Abymes 3rd Canton
- Les Abymes 4th Canton
- Les Abymes 5th Canton
- Les Abymes
- Les Aiglons
- Lesser Antillean macaw
- Lewoz
- Ligue Guadeloupéenne de Football
- Lilian Thuram
- Lists related to Guadeloupe:
  - List of airports in Guadeloupe
  - List of extinct animals of Martinique and Guadeloupe
  - List of Guadeloupan films
  - List of Guadeloupe-related topics
  - List of islands of Guadeloupe
  - List of mammals in Guadeloupe
  - List of political parties in Guadeloupe
  - List of rivers of Guadeloupe
  - List of volcanoes in Guadeloupe
- Louis Delgrès

== M ==
- Mahaudiere
- Majestik Zouk
- Malignon
- Mammals of Guadeloupe
- Marie-Galante
- Massioux
- Médard Albrand
- Military of Guadeloupe
- Monk parakeet
- Morne-à-l'Eau
- Morne-à-l'Eau 1st Canton
- Morne-à-l'Eau 2nd Canton
- Music of Guadeloupe

== N ==
- Nance
- Nancy Fleurival

== P ==
- Palais-Sainte-Marguerite
- Papaya
- Passiflora foetida
- Passport
- Petit-Bourg
- Petit-Canal
- Petite Terre Islands
- Pointe de la Grande Vigie
- Pointe-à-Pitre
- Pointe-à-Pitre 1st Canton
- Pointe-à-Pitre 2nd Canton
- Pointe-à-Pitre 3rd Canton
- Pointe-à-Pitre International Airport
- Pointe-Noire, Guadeloupe
- Political parties in Guadeloupe
- Politics of Guadeloupe
- Portland, Guadeloupe
- Port-Louis, Guadeloupe

== Q ==
- Quatre Chemins

== R ==
- Région Guadeloupe (Guadeloupe)
- Région Guadeloupe et Saint Martin scouting
- Renard, Guadeloupe
- République française (French Republic)
- Rivers of Guadeloupe
- Roman Catholic Diocese of Basse-Terre

== S ==
- Saint-Claude, Guadeloupe
- Sainte-Anne 1st Canton
- Sainte-Anne 2nd Canton
- Sainte-Anne, Guadeloupe
- Sainte-Marguerite, Guadeloupe
- Sainte-Rose 1st Canton
- Sainte-Rose 2nd Canton
- Sainte-Rose, Guadeloupe
- Saint-François, Guadeloupe
- Saint-Louis, Guadeloupe
- Scouting in Guadeloupe
- Solanum mammosum
- Swedish colonization of the Americas
- Swietenia macrophylla

== T ==
- Terre-de-Bas Island
- Terre-de-Bas
- Terre-de-Haut Island
- Terre-de-Haut
- Thierry Henry
- Thomas's yellow-shouldered bat
- Transport in Guadeloupe
- Trois-Rivières, Guadeloupe
- Tropical Storm Dorothy (1970)

== U ==
- Utricularia alpina
- Utricularia jamesoniana

== V ==
- Vaisseaux Bank
- Victor Collot
- Victor Hugues
- Vieux-Fort, Guadeloupe
- Vieux-Habitants
- Vincent Acapandie
- Volcanoes of Guadeloupe

== W ==
- Wikimedia Atlas of Guadeloupe
- William Gallas

== Z ==
- Zevallos
- Zouk

== See also ==
- List of Caribbean-related topics
- List of international rankings
- Lists of country-related topics
- Topic outline of geography
- Topic outline of North America
