= Canton of Goyave =

Coordinates: 16°09′30″N 61°34′30″W

Goyave
- Former canton
- Interactive map of Goyave
- Country: France
- Overseas region and department: Guadeloupe{{{region}}}
- No. of communes: {{{nbcomm}}}
- Disbanded: 2015
- Population (2012): 11,234

The Canton of Goyave is a former canton in the Arrondissement of Basse-Terre on the island of Guadeloupe. It had 11,234 inhabitants (2012). It was disbanded following the French canton reorganisation which came into effect in March 2015. It consisted of two communes, which joined the canton of Petit-Bourg in 2015.

== Municipalities ==
The canton included two communes:

- Goyave
- Petit-Bourg (partly)

== See also ==
- Cantons of Guadeloupe
- Communes of Guadeloupe
- Arrondissements of Guadeloupe
