= Morne-à-l'Eau 1st Canton =

Coordinates: 16.3510°N 61.5157°W

Morne-à-l'Eau-1
- Former canton
- Interactive map of Morne-à-l'Eau-1
- Country: France
- Overseas region and department: Guadeloupe{{{region}}}
- No. of communes: {{{nbcomm}}}
- Disbanded: 2015
- Population (2012): 9,870

Morne-à-l'Eau 1st Canton is a former canton in the Arrondissement of Pointe-à-Pitre on the island of Guadeloupe. It had 9,870 inhabitants (2012). It was disbanded following the French canton reorganisation which came into effect in March 2015. It comprised part of the commune of Morne-à-l'Eau, which joined the new canton of Morne-à-l'Eau in 2015.

== See also ==
- Cantons of Guadeloupe
- Communes of Guadeloupe
- Arrondissements of Guadeloupe
