= Le Moule 1st Canton =

Coordinates: 16.3343°N 61.3490°W

Le Moule-1
- Former canton
- Interactive map of Le Moule-1
- Country: France
- Overseas region and department: Guadeloupe{{{region}}}
- No. of communes: {{{nbcomm}}}
- Disbanded: 2015
- Population (2012): 14,326

Le Moule 1st Canton is a former canton in the Arrondissement of Pointe-à-Pitre on the island of Guadeloupe. It had 14,326 inhabitants (2012). It was disbanded following the French canton reorganisation which came into effect in March 2015. It comprised part of the commune of Le Moule, which joined the new canton of Le Moule in 2015.

== See also ==
- Cantons of Guadeloupe
- Communes of Guadeloupe
- Arrondissements of Guadeloupe
