= Pointe-à-Pitre 3rd Canton =

Coordinates: 16.2343°N 61.5157°W

Pointe-à-Pitre-3
- Former canton
- Interactive map of Pointe-à-Pitre-3
- Country: France
- Overseas region and department: Guadeloupe{{{region}}}
- No. of communes: {{{nbcomm}}}
- Disbanded: 2015
- Population (2012): 7,109

Pointe-à-Pitre 3rd Canton is a former canton in the Arrondissement of Pointe-à-Pitre on the island of Guadeloupe. It had 7,109 inhabitants (2012). It was disbanded following the French canton reorganisation which came into effect in March 2015. It comprised part of the commune of Pointe-à-Pitre, which joined the new canton of Pointe-à-Pitre in 2015.

== See also ==
- Cantons of Guadeloupe
- Communes of Guadeloupe
- Arrondissements of Guadeloupe
