= Canton of Anse-Bertrand =

Coordinates: 16°26′40″N 61°31′13″W

Anse-Bertrand
- Former canton
- Interactive map of Anse-Bertrand
- Country: France
- Overseas region and department: Guadeloupe{{{region}}}
- No. of communes: {{{nbcomm}}}
- Disbanded: 2015
- Population (2012): 10,691

The Canton of Anse-Bertrand is a former canton in the Arrondissement of Pointe-à-Pitre on the island of Guadeloupe. It had 10,691 inhabitants (2012). It was disbanded following the French canton reorganisation which came into effect in March 2015. It consisted of 2 communes, which joined the canton of Petit-Canal in 2015.

== Municipalities ==
The canton comprised 2 communes:

- Anse-Bertrand
- Port-Louis

== See also ==
- Cantons of Guadeloupe
- Communes of Guadeloupe
- Arrondissements of Guadeloupe
