= Canton of Grand-Bourg =

Coordinates: 15°53′04″N 61°18′56″W

Grand-Bourg
- Former canton
- Interactive map of Grand-Bourg
- Country: France
- Overseas region and department: Guadeloupe{{{region}}}
- No. of communes: {{{nbcomm}}}
- Disbanded: 2015
- Area: 55.54 km^{2} (21.44 sq mi)
- Population (2012): 5,423
  - Density: 97.64/km^{2} (252.9/sq mi)

Canton of Grand-Bourg is a former canton in the Arrondissement of Pointe-à-Pitre in the department of Guadeloupe. It covers an area of 55.54 km² and in 2012 it had a population of 5,423. It was disbanded following the French canton reorganisation which came into effect in March 2015. It comprised the commune of Grand-Bourg, which joined the new canton of Marie-Galante in 2015.

== See also ==
- Cantons of Guadeloupe
- Communes of Guadeloupe
- Arrondissements of Guadeloupe
