= Canton of La Désirade =

Coordinates: 16°18′53″N 61°03′05″W

La Désirade
- Former canton
- Interactive map of La Désirade
- Country: France
- Overseas region and department: Guadeloupe{{{region}}}
- No. of communes: {{{nbcomm}}}
- Disbanded: 2015
- Area: 22 km^{2} (8.5 sq mi)
- Population (2012): 1,532
  - Density: 70/km^{2} (180/sq mi)

The Canton of La Désirade is a former canton in the Arrondissement of Pointe-à-Pitre in the department of Guadeloupe. It had 1,532 inhabitants (2012). It is located on La Désirade Island. It was disbanded following the French canton reorganisation which came into effect in March 2015. It comprised the commune of La Désirade, which joined the canton of Saint-François in 2015.

== See also ==
- Cantons of Guadeloupe
- Communes of Guadeloupe
- Arrondissements of Guadeloupe
