= Les Abymes 5th Canton =

Coordinates: 16.2677°N 61.5157°W

Les Abymes-5
- Former canton
- Interactive map of Les Abymes-5
- Country: France
- Overseas region and department: Guadeloupe{{{region}}}
- No. of communes: {{{nbcomm}}}
- Disbanded: 2015
- Population (2012): 8,905

Les Abymes 5th Canton is a former canton in the Arrondissement of Pointe-à-Pitre on the island of Guadeloupe, which had 8,905 inhabitants in 2012. It comprised part of the commune of Les Abymes and disbanded following the French canton reorganisation of March 2015.

== See also ==
- Cantons of Guadeloupe
- Communes of Guadeloupe
- Arrondissements of Guadeloupe
