= Canton of Gourbeyre =

Coordinates: 16°00′04″N 61°41′56″W

Gourbeyre
- Former canton
- Interactive map of Gourbeyre
- Country: France
- Overseas region and department: Guadeloupe{{{region}}}
- No. of communes: {{{nbcomm}}}
- Disbanded: 2015
- Area: 22.52 km^{2} (8.70 sq mi)
- Population (2012): 7,820
  - Density: 347/km^{2} (899/sq mi)

The Canton of Gourbeyre is a former canton in the Arrondissement of Basse-Terre on the island of Guadeloupe. It had 7,820 inhabitants (2012). It was disbanded following the French canton reorganisation which came into effect in March 2015. It comprised the commune of Gourbeyre, which joined the canton of Trois-Rivières in 2015.

== See also ==
- Cantons of Guadeloupe
- Communes of Guadeloupe
- Arrondissements of Guadeloupe
