= Canton of Baie-Mahault =

Coordinates: 16°16′04″N 61°34′56″W

Baie-Mahault
- Former canton
- Interactive map of Baie-Mahault
- Country: France
- Overseas region and department: Guadeloupe{{{region}}}
- No. of communes: {{{nbcomm}}}
- Disbanded: 2015
- Area: 4.4 km^{2} (1.7 sq mi)
- Population (2012): 29,976
  - Density: 6,800/km^{2} (18,000/sq mi)

The Canton of Baie-Mahault is a former canton in the Arrondissement of Basse-Terre on the island of Guadeloupe. It had 29,976 inhabitants (2012). It was disbanded following the French canton reorganisation which came into effect in March 2015. The canton comprised the commune of Baie-Mahault.

== See also ==
- Cantons of Guadeloupe
- Communes of Guadeloupe
- Arrondissements of Guadeloupe
