= Jabrun, Guadeloupe =

Settlement in Guadeloupe

Coordinates: 16°18′20″N 61°26′40″W

Jabrun is a settlement in Guadeloupe in the commune of Morne-à-l'Eau, on the island of Grande-Terre. Chazeau, Malignon, and Jabrun-du-Sud are to the west.
