= Canton of Capesterre-de-Marie-Galante =

Coordinates: 15°54′04″N 61°12′56″W

Capesterre-de-Marie-Galante
- Former canton
- Interactive map of Capesterre-de-Marie-Galante
- Country: France
- Overseas region and department: Guadeloupe{{{region}}}
- No. of communes: {{{nbcomm}}}
- Disbanded: 2015
- Area: 46.19 km^{2} (17.83 sq mi)
- Population (2012): 3,330
  - Density: 72.1/km^{2} (187/sq mi)

The Canton of Capesterre-de-Marie-Galante is a former canton in the Arrondissement of Pointe-à-Pitre in the department of Guadeloupe. It had 3,330 inhabitants (2012). It was disbanded following the French canton reorganisation which came into effect in March 2015. It comprised the commune of Capesterre-de-Marie-Galante, which joined the new canton of Marie-Galante in 2015.

== See also ==
- Cantons of Guadeloupe
- Communes of Guadeloupe
- Arrondissements of Guadeloupe
