= Sainte-Anne 1st Canton =

Coordinates: 16.2343°N 61.3823°W

Sainte-Anne-1
- Former canton
- Interactive map of Sainte-Anne-1
- Country: France
- Overseas region and department: Guadeloupe{{{region}}}
- No. of communes: {{{nbcomm}}}
- Disbanded: 2015
- Population (2012): 12,041

Sainte-Anne 1st Canton is a former canton in the Arrondissement of Pointe-à-Pitre on the island of Guadeloupe. It had 12,041 inhabitants (2012). It was disbanded following the French canton reorganisation which came into effect in March 2015.

== Municipalities ==
The canton included part of the commune of Sainte-Anne.

== See also ==
- Cantons of Guadeloupe
- Communes of Guadeloupe
- Arrondissements of Guadeloupe
