= Le Gosier 1st Canton =

Coordinates: 16.2190°N 61.5028°W

Le Gosier-1
- Former canton
- Interactive map of Le Gosier-1
- Country: France
- Overseas region and department: Guadeloupe{{{region}}}
- No. of communes: {{{nbcomm}}}
- Disbanded: 2015
- Population (2012): 8,011

Le Gosier 1st Canton is a former canton in the Arrondissement of Pointe-à-Pitre on the island of Guadeloupe. It had 8,011 inhabitants (2012). It was disbanded following the French canton reorganisation which came into effect in March 2015. The canton comprised part of the commune of Le Gosier.

== See also ==
- Cantons of Guadeloupe
- Communes of Guadeloupe
- Arrondissements of Guadeloupe
