= Le Gosier 2nd Canton =

Coordinates: 16.2190°N 61.5028°W

Le Gosier-2
- Former canton
- Interactive map of Le Gosier-2
- Country: France
- Overseas region and department: Guadeloupe{{{region}}}
- No. of communes: {{{nbcomm}}}
- Disbanded: 2015
- Population (2012): 18,602

Le Gosier 2nd Canton is a former canton in the Arrondissement of Pointe-à-Pitre on the island of Guadeloupe. It had 18,602 inhabitants (2012). It was disbanded following the French canton reorganisation which came into effect in March 2015. The canton comprised part of the commune of Le Gosier.

== See also ==
- Cantons of Guadeloupe
- Communes of Guadeloupe
- Arrondissements of Guadeloupe
