= Desirade =

Desirade may refer to:

== Places ==
- La Désirade (Désirade Island), an island in the French West Indies, Lesser Antilles, Caribbean; part of overseas France, in the commune of La Désirade
- La Désirade (commune) (Désirade Commune), Guadeloupe, overseas France; composed of the island of La Désirade and neighboring islets in the Caribbean
- Canton of La Désirade, La Désirade, Guadeloupe, overseas France
- La Désirade National Nature Reserve, Désirade Island
- La Désirade Airport, Désirade Island
- La Désirade Passage, a strait separating Désirade from Grande-Terre on Guadeloupe Island, in the French West Indies, Lesser Antilles, Caribbean

== Other uses ==
- La Desirade anole, a lizard found on La Désirade
- Désirade skink, a lizard found in Guadeloupe
- La Désirade curlytail lizard, an extinct lizard once found on Désirade

== See also ==
- The dictionary definition of desirar at Wiktionary
