= Les Abymes 4th Canton =

Coordinates: 16.2677°N 61.5157°W

Les Abymes-4
- Former canton
- Interactive map of Les Abymes-4
- Country: France
- Overseas region and department: Guadeloupe{{{region}}}
- No. of communes: {{{nbcomm}}}
- Disbanded: 2015
- Population (2012): 14,692

Les Abymes 4th Canton is a former canton in the Arrondissement of Pointe-à-Pitre on the island of Guadeloupe. It had 14,692 inhabitants (2012). It was disbanded following the French canton reorganisation which came into effect in March 2015. The canton comprised part of the commune of Les Abymes.

== See also ==
- Cantons of Guadeloupe
- Communes of Guadeloupe
- Arrondissements of Guadeloupe
