= Sainte-Anne 2nd Canton =

Coordinates: 16.2343°N 61.3823°W

Sainte-Anne-2
- Former canton
- Interactive map of Sainte-Anne-2
- Country: France
- Overseas region and department: Guadeloupe{{{region}}}
- No. of communes: {{{nbcomm}}}
- Disbanded: 2015
- Population (2012): 12,671

Sainte-Anne 2nd Canton is a former canton in the Arrondissement of Pointe-à-Pitre on the island of Guadeloupe. It had 12,671 inhabitants (2012). It was disbanded following the French canton reorganisation which came into effect in March 2015. The canton comprised part of the commune of Sainte-Anne.

== See also ==
- Cantons of Guadeloupe
- Communes of Guadeloupe
- Arrondissements of Guadeloupe
