= Canton of Lamentin =

Coordinates: 16°16′22″N 61°37′54″W

Lamentin
- Canton
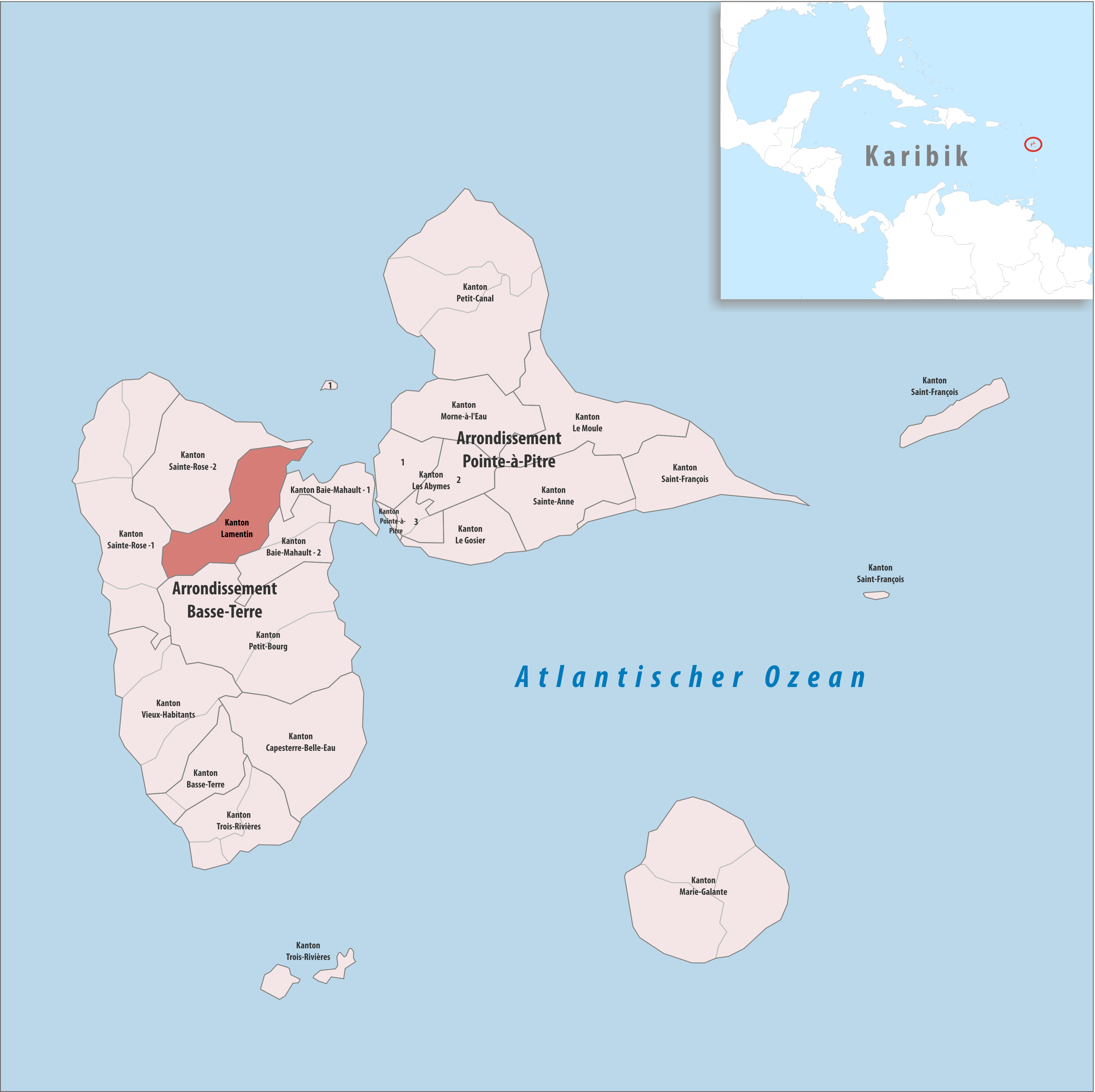
- Country: France
- Overseas region and department: Guadeloupe{{{region}}}
- No. of communes: {{{nbcomm}}}

Government
  - Representatives (2021–2028): Clara Rigah; Jocelyn Sapotille
- Area: 65.6 km^{2} (25.3 sq mi)
- Population (2023): 18,628
  - Density: 284/km^{2} (735/sq mi)
- INSEE code: 971 09

The Canton of Lamentin is a canton in the Arrondissement of Basse-Terre on the island of Guadeloupe. Its population was 16,573 in 2017.

== Municipalities ==
The canton includes 1 commune:

- Lamentin

== See also ==
- Cantons of Guadeloupe
- Communes of Guadeloupe
- Arrondissements of Guadeloupe
