= Canton of Les Abymes-2 =

Coordinates: 16.27°N 61.50°W

Les Abymes-2
- Canton
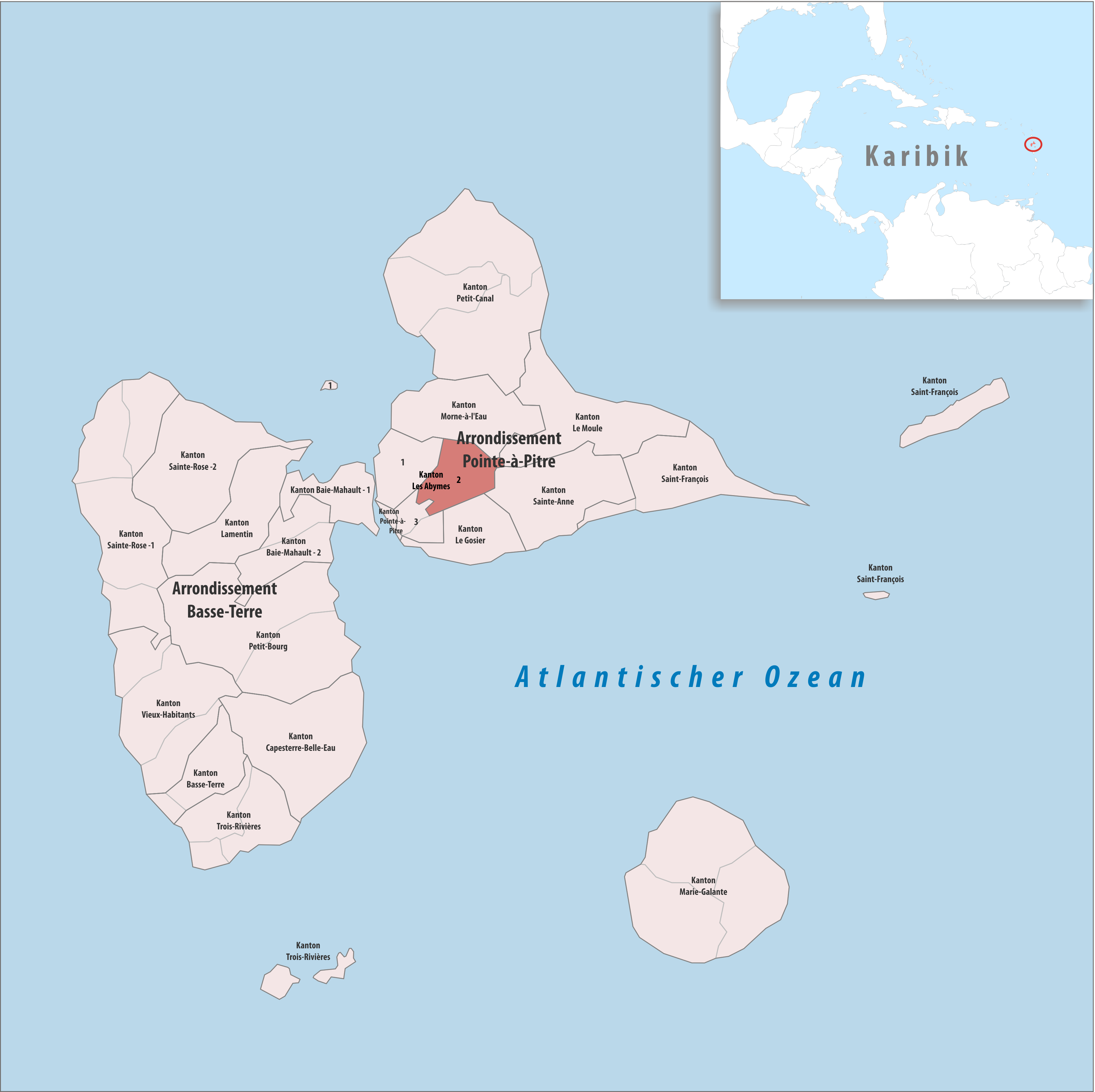
- Country: France
- Overseas region and department: Guadeloupe{{{region}}}
- No. of communes: {{{nbcomm}}}
- Population (2023): 20,072
- INSEE code: 971 02

Canton of Les Abymes-2 is a canton in the Arrondissement of Pointe-à-Pitre on the island of Guadeloupe.

== Municipalities ==
The canton includes part of the commune of Les Abymes.

== See also ==
- Cantons of Guadeloupe
- Communes of Guadeloupe
- Arrondissements of Guadeloupe
