= Canton of Les Abymes-3 =

Coordinates: 16.25°N 61.52°W

Les Abymes-3
- Canton
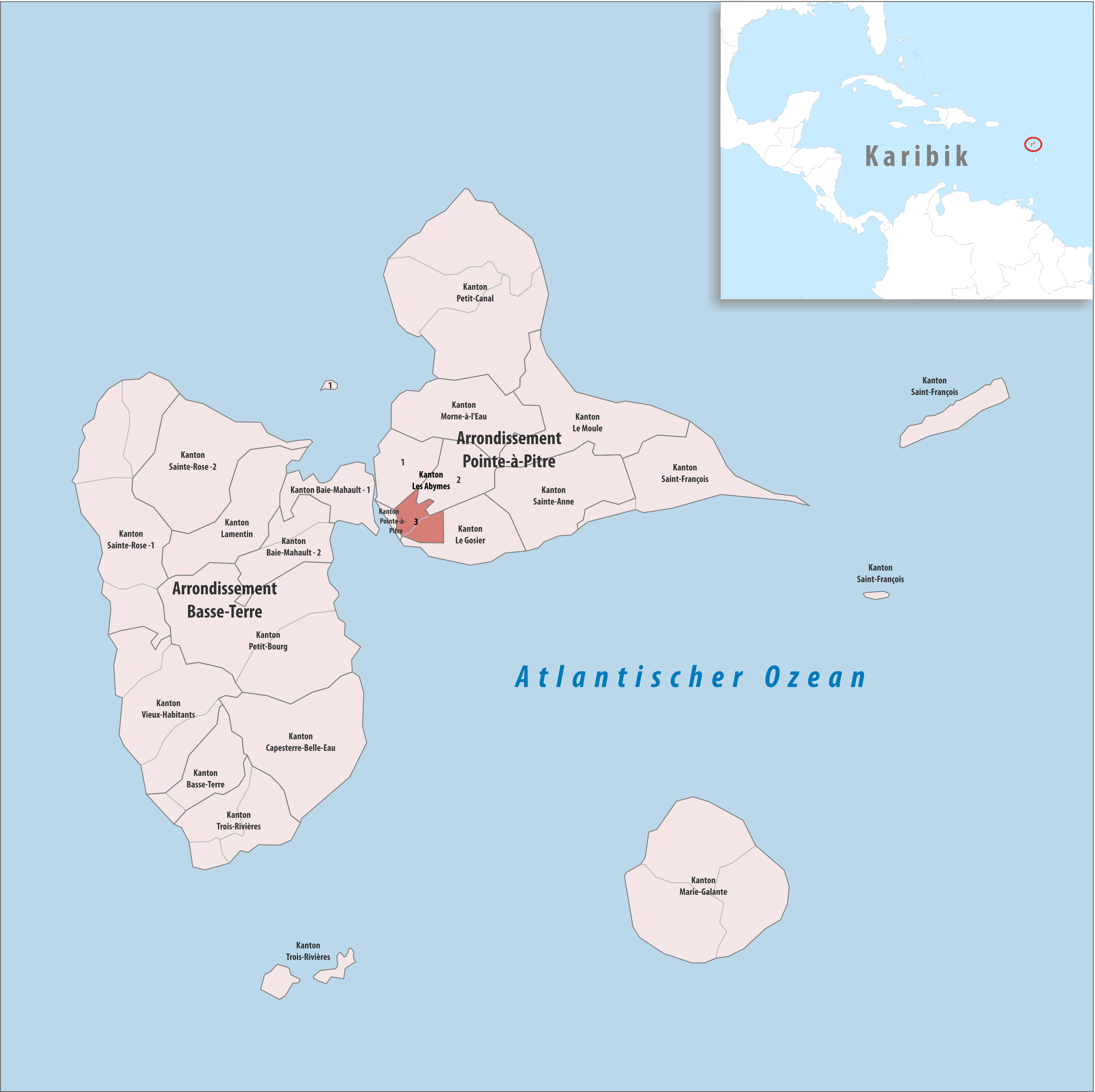
- Country: France
- Overseas region and department: Guadeloupe{{{region}}}
- No. of communes: {{{nbcomm}}}
- Population (2023): 19,723
- INSEE code: 971 03

Canton of Les Abymes-3 is a canton in the Arrondissement of Pointe-à-Pitre on the island of Guadeloupe.

== Municipalities ==
Since the French canton reorganisation which came into effect in March 2015, the communes of the canton are:

- Les Abymes (partly)
- Le Gosier (partly)

== See also ==
- Cantons of Guadeloupe
- Communes of Guadeloupe
- Arrondissements of Guadeloupe
