= Canton of Les Abymes-1 =

Coordinates: 16.2677°N 61.5157°W

Les Abymes-1
- Canton
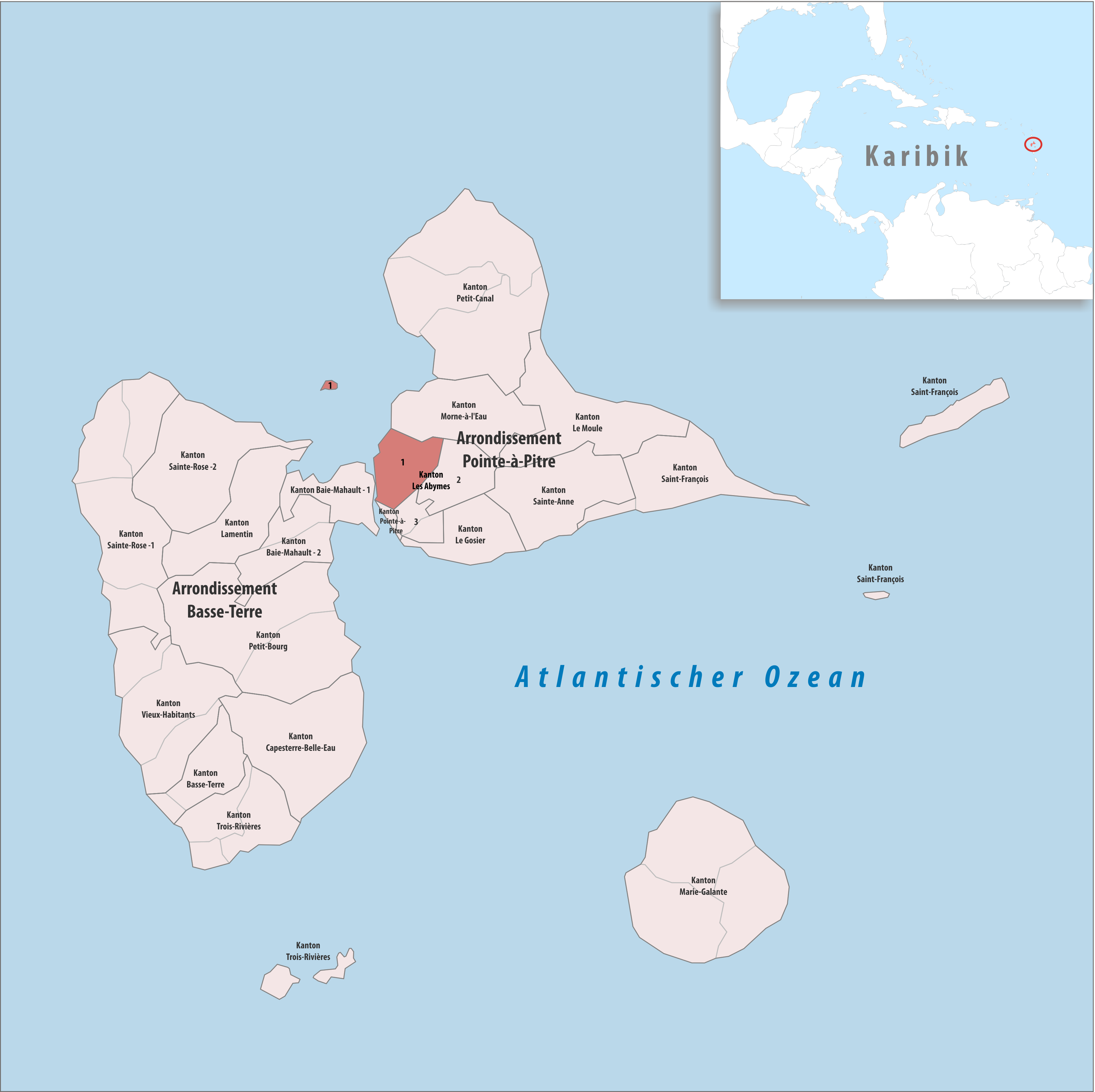
- Location of the Canton of Les Abymes-1 in Guadeloupe
- Country: France
- Overseas region and department: Guadeloupe{{{region}}}
- No. of communes: {{{nbcomm}}}
- Population (2023): 15,002
- INSEE code: 971 01

Canton of Les Abymes-1 is a canton in the Arrondissement of Pointe-à-Pitre on the island of Guadeloupe.

== Municipalities ==
The canton includes part of the commune of Les Abymes.

== Representation ==
=== Representation prior to 2015 ===
List of successive general councillors
Term		Name	Party	Capacity
1964	1985	Frédéric Jalton	SFIO then PS	Deputy (1973–1978 & 1981–1995); European Deputy (1980–1981); Mayor of Les Abymes (1967–1995)
1985	1998	Rosan Fanhan	PS	
1998	2009 (resigned)	Éric Jalton	FGPS	Deputy (2002–2017); Mayor of Les Abymes (2008–present)
2009	2015	Chantal Lérus	FGPS	

=== Representation since 2015 ===
List of successive departmental councillors
Term		Mandate		Name	Party	Capacity
2015	2021	2015	2021	Chantal Lérus	DVG	
2015	2021	2015	2021	Rosan Rauzduel	DVG	
2021	2028	2021	present	Francesca Faithful	DVG	
2021	2028	2021	present	Rosan Vincent Rauzduel	DVG	

== See also ==
- Cantons of Guadeloupe
- Communes of Guadeloupe
- Arrondissements of Guadeloupe
