= Canton of Saint-Louis =

Canton of Saint-Louis may refer to 2 administrative divisions in France:

- Canton of Saint-Louis, Haut-Rhin, in Haut-Rhin department, Grand Est
- Canton of Saint-Louis, Guadeloupe, in Réunion
