= Canton of Saint-François =

Coordinates: 16°15′04″N 61°16′56″W

Saint-François
- Canton
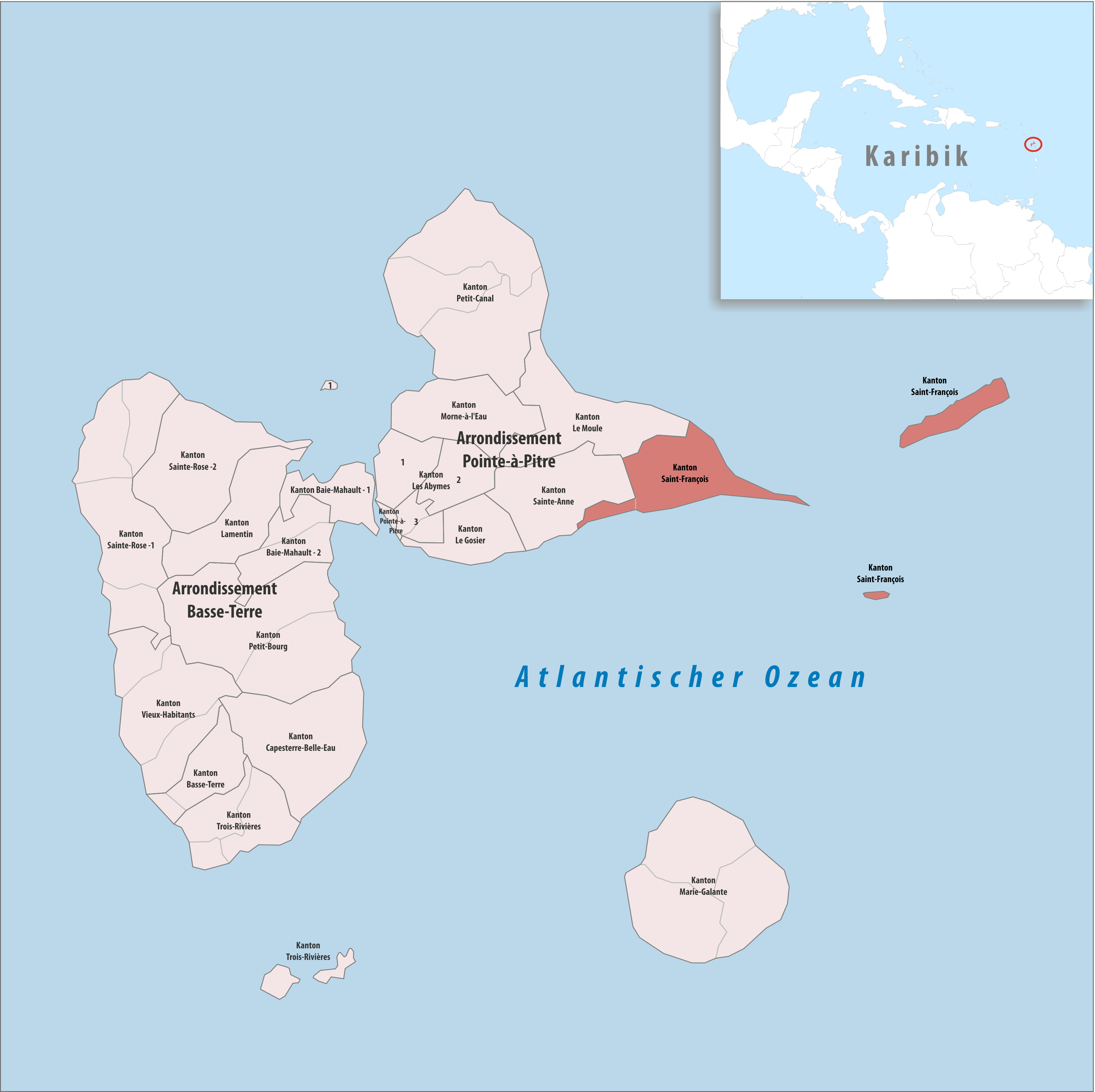
- Country: France
- Overseas region and department: Guadeloupe{{{region}}}
- No. of communes: {{{nbcomm}}}
- Population (2023): 18,964
- INSEE code: 971 16

The Canton of Saint-François is a canton in the Arrondissement of Pointe-à-Pitre on the island of Guadeloupe.

== Municipalities ==
Since the French canton reorganisation which came into effect in March 2015, the communes of the canton are:

- La Désirade
- Sainte-Anne (partly)
- Saint-François

== See also ==
- Cantons of Guadeloupe
- Communes of Guadeloupe
- Arrondissements of Guadeloupe
