= Canton of Saint-Barthélemy =

Coordinates: 17.8982°N 62.8526°W

- Former canton
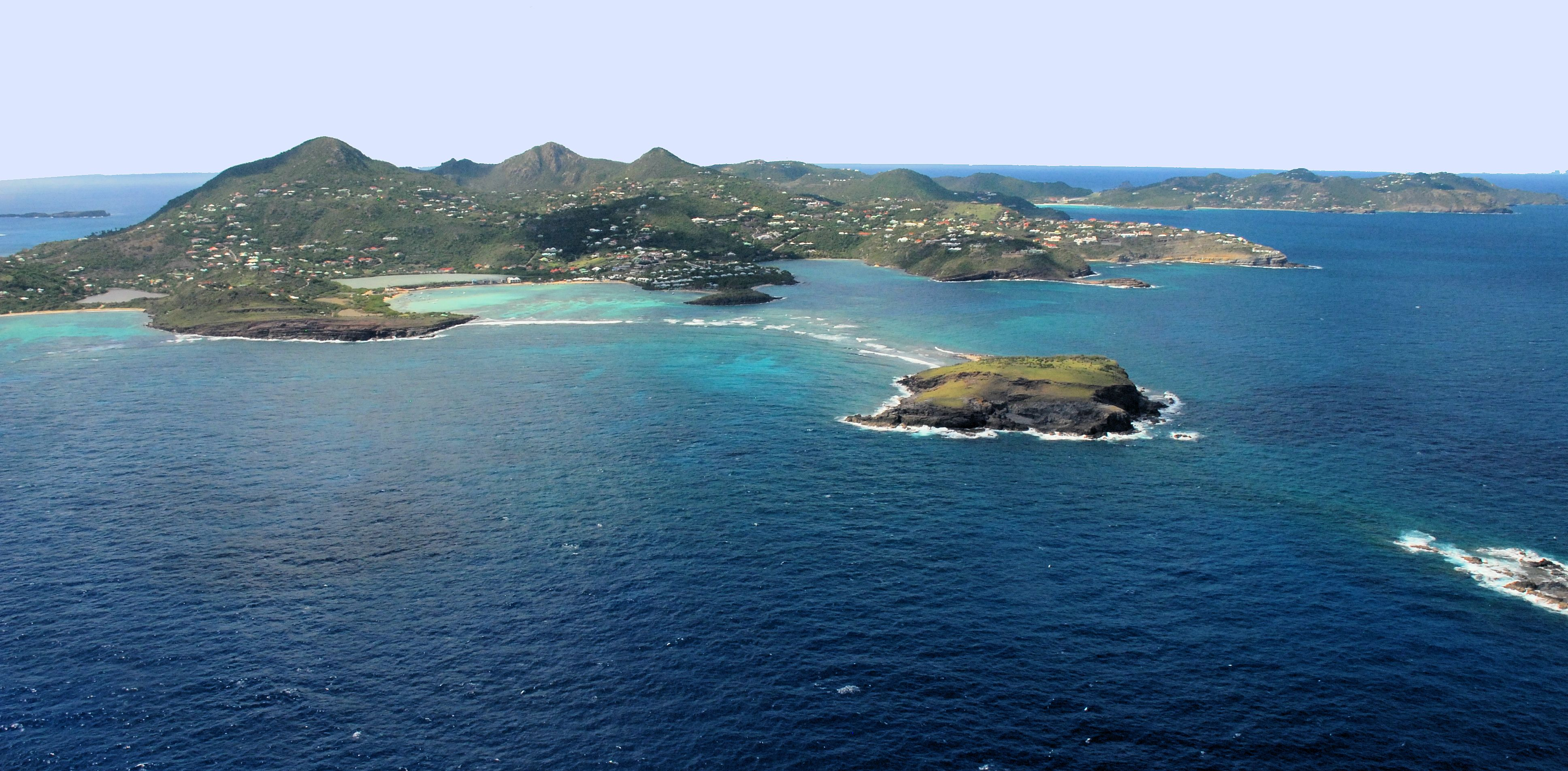
- Interactive map of Canton of Saint-Barthélemy
- Country: France
- Overseas region and department: Guadeloupe{{{region}}}
- No. of communes: {{{nbcomm}}}
- Disbanded: 22 February 2007
- Area: 21 km^{2} (8.1 sq mi)
- Population (2007): 8,450
  - Density: 400/km^{2} (1,000/sq mi)

The canton of Saint-Barthélemy (French: Canton de Saint-Barthélemy) is a former canton of Guadeloupe. It was located in the arrondissement of Saint-Martin-Saint-Barthélemy, with its administrative seat located in Saint-Barthélemy.

== Communes ==
The canton's only commune, Saint-Barthélemy had a population of 8,450 in 2007 when the canton ceased to exist.

== Administration ==
List of successive general councillors
Term		Name	Party
1955	1973	Rémy De Haenen	UNR then DVD
1973	1985	M. Blanchard	DVD
1985	1992	M. Ledée	DVD
1992	1998	Nordleing Magras	
1998	2007	Michel Magras	DVG
