= Canton of Petit-Bourg =

Canton in Guadeloupe, France

Coordinates: 16°11′04″N 61°34′56″W

Petit-Bourg
- Canton
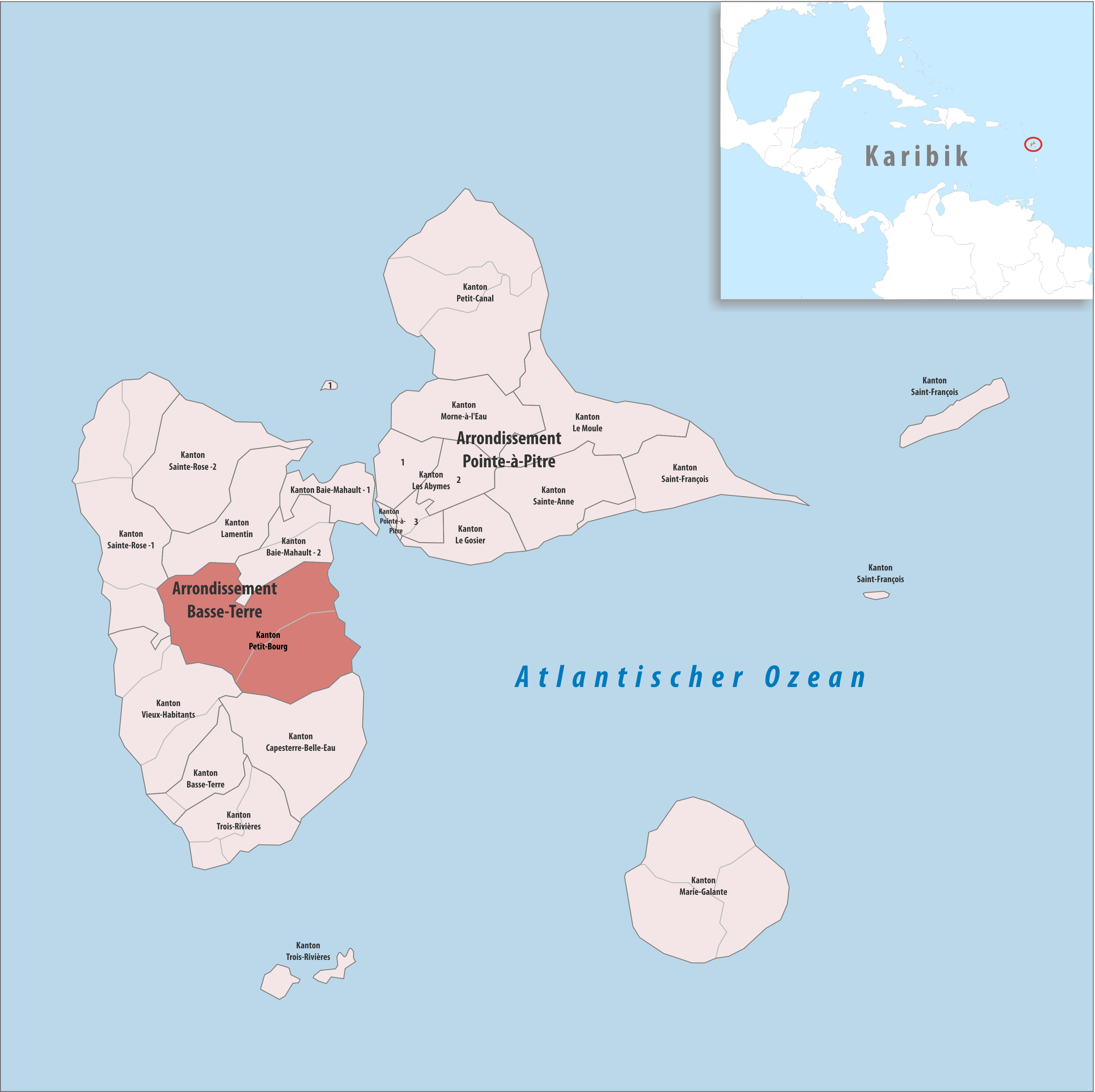
- Country: France
- Overseas region and department: Guadeloupe{{{region}}}
- No. of communes: {{{nbcomm}}}
- Population (2023): 19,753
- INSEE code: 971 13

The Canton of Petit-Bourg is a canton in the Arrondissement of Basse-Terre on the island of Guadeloupe.

== Municipalities ==
Since the French canton reorganisation which came into effect in March 2015, the communes of the canton are:

- Goyave
- Petit-Bourg (partly)

== See also ==
- Cantons of Guadeloupe
- Communes of Guadeloupe
- Arrondissements of Guadeloupe
