= Canton of Petit-Canal =

Coordinates: 16°23′04″N 61°28′56″W

Petit-Canal
- Canton
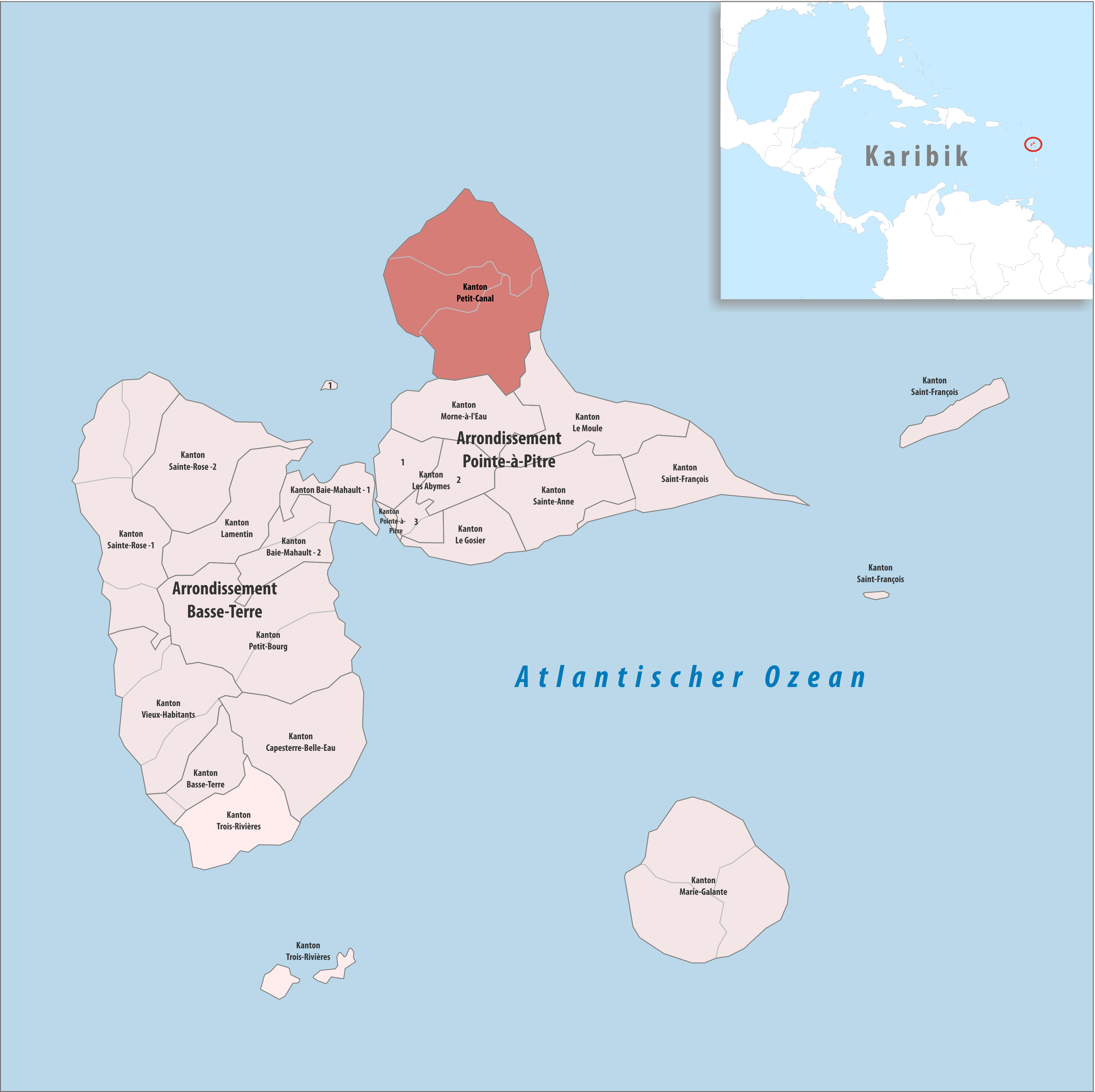
- Country: France
- Overseas region and department: Guadeloupe{{{region}}}
- No. of communes: {{{nbcomm}}}
- Population (2023): 18,231
- INSEE code: 971 14

The Canton of Petit-Canal is a canton in the Arrondissement of Pointe-à-Pitre on the island of Guadeloupe.

== Municipalities ==
Since the French canton reorganisation which came into effect in March 2015, the communes of the canton are:

- Anse-Bertrand
- Petit-Canal
- Port-Louis

== See also ==
- Cantons of Guadeloupe
- Communes of Guadeloupe
- Arrondissements of Guadeloupe
