= Médard Albrand =

French politician

Médard Albrand (8 June 1898 in Petit-Canal, Guadeloupe – 26 July 1981 in Paris) was a politician from Guadeloupe who served in the French National Assembly from 1958 to 1967.
