= Arrondissement of Saint-Martin-Saint-Barthélemy =

Former arrondissement of France

Coordinates: 18°N 63°W

Saint-Martin-Saint-Barthélemy
- Former arrondissement
- Interactive map of Saint-Martin-Saint-Barthélemy
- Country: France
- Overseas region and department: Guadeloupe{{{region}}}
- No. of communes: 2
- Disbanded: 22 February 2007
- Area: 74 km^{2} (29 sq mi)
- Population (1999): 35,930
  - Density: 490/km^{2} (1,300/sq mi)

The arrondissement of Saint-Martin-Saint-Barthélemy is a former arrondissement of France, in the département of Guadeloupe. It had two communes–Saint-Martin and Saint Barthelemy. It ceased to exist on 22 February 2007 when the communes were officially detached from Guadeloupe and elevated to separate overseas collectivities of France.

== History ==
Guadeloupe became an overseas department of France on 19 March 1946. On 1 February 1963, the communes of Saint-Martin and Saint Barthélemy were formally added as a third arrondissement of Guadeloupe. On 2 March 1973, Guadeloupe later became a region of France, while retaining its status as an overseas department. Following a referendum on 7 December 2003, in which the residents of both Saint-Martin and Saint-Barthélemy voted to leave Guadeloupe and become separate overseas collectivities, the French Parliament passed the enabling law on 21 February 2007, and the new status took effect on 15 July 2007. The French Constitution allows overseas collectivities to exist with Article 74 allowing them to have specific autonomy in framing the laws. The 2003 referendum was conducted to ascertain whether Saint-Martin and Saint-Barthélemy should remain with Guadeloupe or become separate overseas collectivities under Article 74. The islands voted to split from Guadeloupe and became separate collectivities.

== Geography ==
The arrondissement encompassed the northern two-thirds of the island of Saint Martin and the nearby separate island of Saint-Barthélemy, located in the Lesser Antilles in the Caribbean. The French part of Saint Martin consists of 53 km^{2} (20 sq mi) of the island and the island of Barthelemy is spread over an area of 25 km^{2} (9.7 sq mi).

== See also ==
- Cantons of the Guadeloupe department
- Communes of the Guadeloupe department
