= La Démocratie sociale =

French language radical and republican weekly newspaper

- Type: Weekly
- Founded: 1909
- Political alignment: Radical and Republican
- Language: French language
- Headquarters: Basse-Terre

La Démocratie sociale ('Social Democracy') was a French radical and republican weekly newspaper published from Basse-Terre, Guadeloupe. La Démocratie sociale was founded in 1909, as an organ of the Candacist party. It was initially edited by Vital Borifax. As of 1937, its director was Charles Moynac.
