= Camaz 89 =

Football club in Guadeloupe

- Full name: Camaz 89
- Ground: Stade Municipal, Capesterre-Belle-Eau, Guadeloupe
- Chairman: Louis Guy Hubert
- Manager: Moïse Castry
- League: Promotion d'Honneur Regionale.
- 2008/09: 14th (Guadeloupe Division d'Honneur)
Home colours

Camaz 89 is a football club in Guadeloupe, based in the town of Capesterre-Belle-Eau.

They play in Guadeloupe's second division, the Promotion d'Honneur Regionale.

== Achievements ==
- none
