= Vaisseaux Bank =

Coordinates: 16°08′N 61°17′W

Vaisseaux Bank is an area of shallow water eight kilometres from the south coast of Grande-Terre, in the French Caribbean département of Guadeloupe. It is a significant hazard to shipping. Species of Haplocochlias have been identified around the bank.
