= Communauté d'agglomération du Nord Grande-Terre =

Nord Grande-Terre
- Communauté d'agglomération
- Location of Nord Grande-Terre within the department
- Coordinates: 16°25′N 61°30′W
- Country: France
- Overseas region and department: Guadeloupe{{{region}}}
- No. of communes: {{{nbcomm}}}
- Established: 2014
- Area: 324.6 km^{2} (125.3 sq mi)
- Population (2019): 56,466
  - Density: 174.0/km^{2} (450.5/sq mi)
- Website: www.cangt.fr

Communauté d'agglomération du Nord Grande-Terre is a communauté d'agglomération, an intercommunal structure in the Guadeloupe overseas department and region of France. Created in 2014, its seat is in Port-Louis. Its area is 324.6 km^{2}. Its population was 56,466 in 2019.

== Composition ==
The communauté d'agglomération consists of the following 5 communes:

1. Anse-Bertrand
2. Morne-à-l'Eau
3. Le Moule
4. Petit-Canal
5. Port-Louis
