= Malignon =

Coordinates: 16.2934°N 61.4283°W

Malignon is a settlement in Guadeloupe, on the island of Grande-Terre. Quatre Chemins and Boisripeau are to the west; Jabrun is to the east.
