= Quatre Chemins =

Quatre Chemins Quatre Chemins
- Location within Guadeloupe
- Country: Guadeloupe
- Island: Grande-Terre
- Commune: Les Abymes

Quatre Chemins is a settlement in Guadeloupe in the commune of Les Abymes, on the island of Grande-Terre.

== Location ==
It is located to the west of Malignon, Jabrun-du-Sud, and Chazeau.
