= Jabrun-du-Sud =

Human settlement in Guadeloupe, France

Coordinates: 16.3030°N 61.4589°W

Jabrun-du-Sud is a settlement in Guadeloupe, on the island of Grande-Terre. Quatre Chemins and Boisripeau are to its west, and Jabrun is to the east.
