= Communauté d'agglomération La Riviéra du Levant =

La Riviéra du Levant
- Communauté d'agglomération
- Location of La Riviéra du Levant within the department
- Coordinates: 16°15′N 61°25′W
- Country: France
- Overseas region and department: Guadeloupe{{{region}}}
- No. of communes: {{{nbcomm}}}
- Established: 2014
- Area: 207.6 km^{2} (80.2 sq mi)
- Population (2019): 63,748
  - Density: 307.1/km^{2} (795.3/sq mi)
- Website: www.rivieradulevant.fr

Communauté d'agglomération La Riviéra du Levant is a communauté d'agglomération, an intercommunal structure in the Guadeloupe overseas department and region of France. Created in 2014, its seat is in Le Gosier. Its area is 207.6 km^{2}. Its population was 63,748 in 2019.

== Composition ==
The communauté d'agglomération consists of the following 4 communes:

1. La Désirade
2. Le Gosier
3. Sainte-Anne
4. Saint-François
