= Petit-Canal =

- Commune
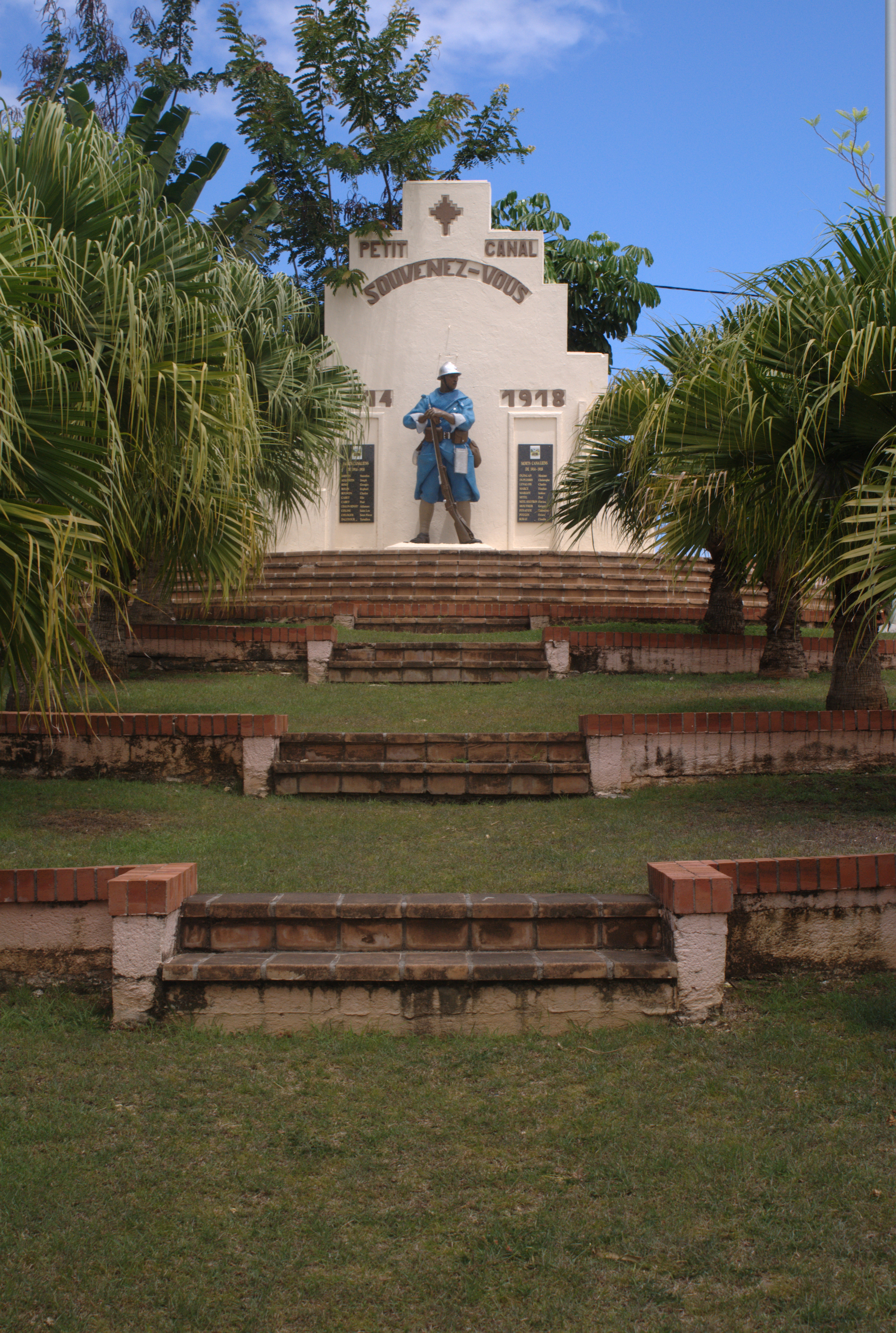
- The war memorial in Petit-Canal

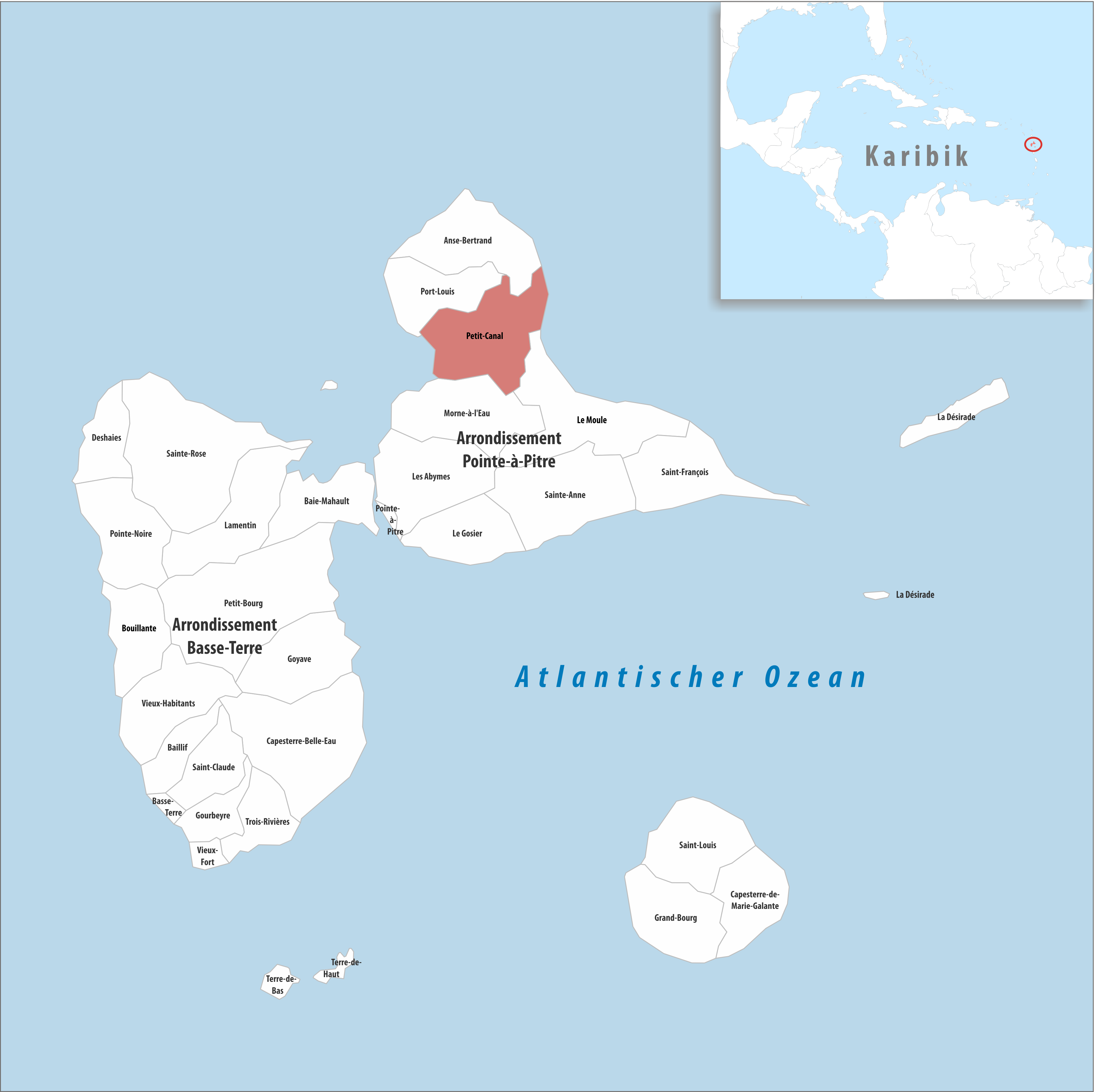
- Location of the commune (in red) within Guadeloupe
- Location of Petit-Canal
- Coordinates: 16°23′00″N 61°29′00″W
- Country: France
- Overseas region and department: Guadeloupe
- Arrondissement: Pointe-à-Pitre
- Canton: Petit-Canal
- Intercommunality: CA Nord Grande-Terre

Government
  - Mayor (2020–2026): Blaise Mornal
- Area^{1}: 72 km^{2} (28 sq mi)
- Elevation: 0 m (0 ft)
- Population (2023): 8,212
  - Density: 110/km^{2} (300/sq mi)
- Time zone: UTC−04:00 (AST)
- INSEE/Postal code: 97119 /97131
- ^{1} French Land Register data, which excludes lakes, ponds, glaciers > 1 km^{2} (0.386 sq mi or 247 acres) and river estuaries.

Petit-Canal (French pronunciation: [pəti kanal], literally Little Canal; Guadeloupean Creole: Ti Kannal or Kannal) is a commune in the department of Guadeloupe. Petit-Canal is a coastal commune on Grande-Terre.

== Population ==
Historical population
Year	Pop.	±% p.a.
1967	5,887	—
1974	5,826	−0.15%
1982	5,843	+0.04%
1990	6,590	+1.52%
1999	7,752	+1.82%
2007	8,243	+0.77%
2012	8,005	−0.58%
2017	8,220	+0.53%
2023	8,212	−0.02%
Source: INSEE

== Education ==
Public preschools and primary schools include:

- Ecole primaire Albertine Borel
- Ecole primaire Félicité Coline
- Ecole primaire Alice Delacroix
- Ecole primaire Sainte Geneviève
- Ecole maternelle Amédée Fengarol

Public junior high schools include:

- Collège Maximilien Vrecord

== Notable residents ==
- Médard Albrand, (1898-1981), politician

== See also ==
- Communes of the Guadeloupe department
