= List of Guadeloupan films =

This is a list of films produced in, set in, or related to Guadeloupe, in alphabetical order.

Title	Year	Director	Cast	Genre	Notes
A
Adriana, le Cahier Noir	2008	Tony Coco-Viloin			
B
C
C comme l'oiseau	2004				
Chap'la	1980	Christian Lara		Drama	
Cracking Up	2004	Christian Lara			
E
Erzulie la magnifique	1991	Véronika Wedo Dessout		Documentary	
K
Karukéra-Gorée... Mémoire de Demain	2003	Tony Coco-Viloin		Documentary	
L
Le cri des Neg Mawon	1992	Tony Coco-Viloin			
Lettre à Irène	2006	Tony Coco-Viloin			
M
La Machette et le marteau	1975				
S
Simeon	1983	Euzhan Palcy	Kassav'	Musical	Fairy tale
Sucre amer	1998	Christian Lara	Jean-Michel Martial	Historical drama	
T
Tèt Grenné	2002	Gilda Gonfier			
U
Un homme à femmes	2004				
W
When the Spirits Come	1992				

== See also ==
- Cinema of the Caribbean
