= La Désirade (commune) =

- Commune
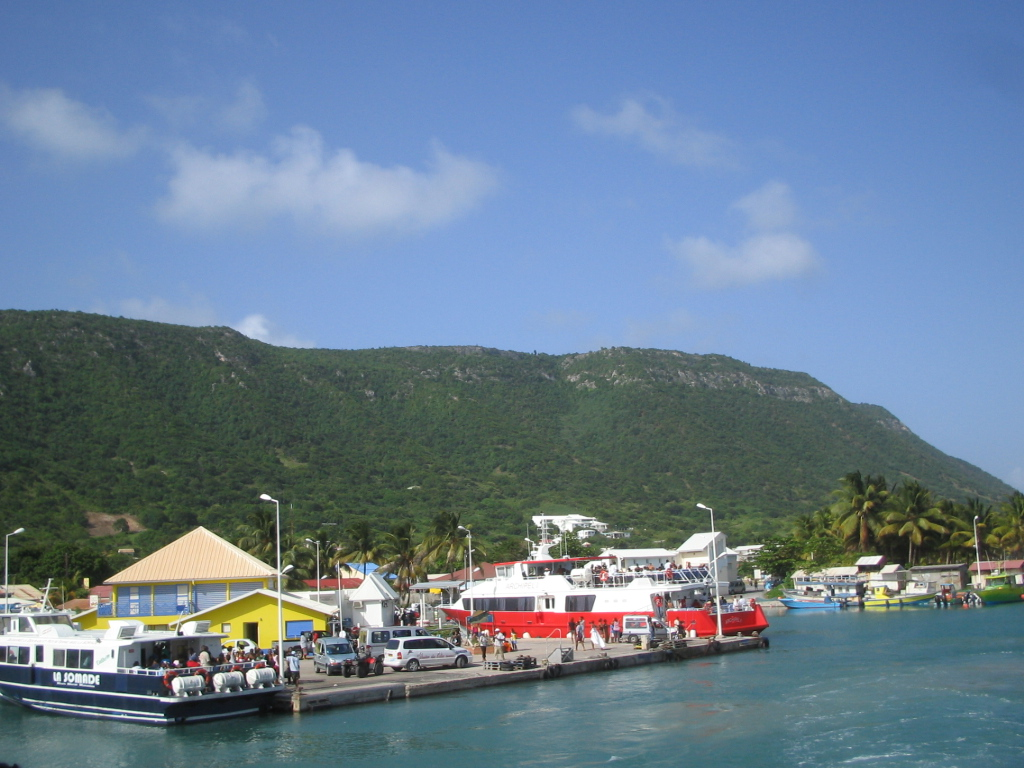
- The village of Beauséjour in the commune of La Désirade

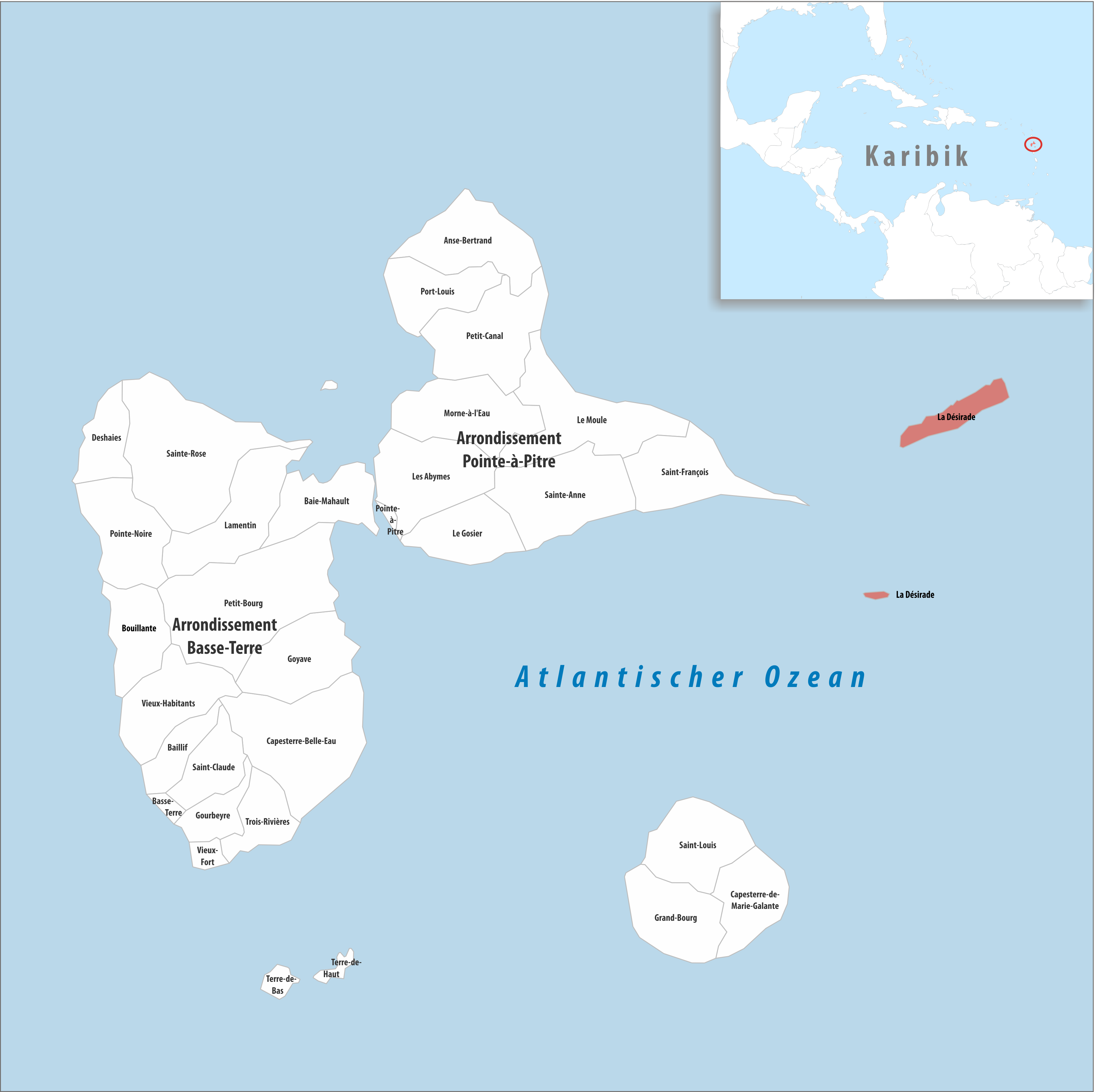
- Location of the commune (in red) within Guadeloupe
- Location of La Désirade
- Coordinates: 16°18′10″N 61°04′31″W
- Country: France
- Overseas region and department: Guadeloupe
- Arrondissement: Pointe-à-Pitre
- Canton: Saint-François
- Intercommunality: CA La Riviéra du Levant

Government
  - Mayor (2020–2026): Loïc Tonton
- Area^{1}: 21.12 km^{2} (8.15 sq mi)
- Population (2023): 1,306
  - Density: 61.84/km^{2} (160.2/sq mi)
- Time zone: UTC−04:00 (AST)
- INSEE/Postal code: 97110 /97127
- Website: www.mairie-ladesirade.fr
- ^{1} French Land Register data, which excludes lakes, ponds, glaciers > 1 km^{2} (0.386 sq mi or 247 acres) and river estuaries.

La Désirade (French pronunciation: [la deziʁad]; Guadeloupean Creole: Dézirad or Déziwad) is a commune in the French overseas region and department of Guadeloupe, in the Lesser Antilles. The commune of La Désirade is made up of the island of La Désirade and the uninhabited Petite Terre Islands located about 10 kilometres (6 mi) south of it.

The administrative centre of the commune is the settlement of Beauséjour on the island of La Désirade.

== Education ==
Public preschools and primary schools include:

- Ecole primaire Beauséjour
- Ecole maternelle Baie-Mahault
- Ecole maternelle Louis Adrien Thionville

Public junior high schools include:

- Collège Maryse Condé

== See also ==
- La Désirade
- Communes of the Guadeloupe department
