= Chazeau =

Populated island settlement

Coordinates: 16°17′44″N 61°27′33″W

To be distinguished from Chazeau, Loire a commune in France merged with Firminy in 1959.

Chazeau is a settlement in Guadeloupe, on the island of Grande-Terre. It is located to the east of Quatre Chemins and Boisripeau.
