= Lamentin =

- Commune
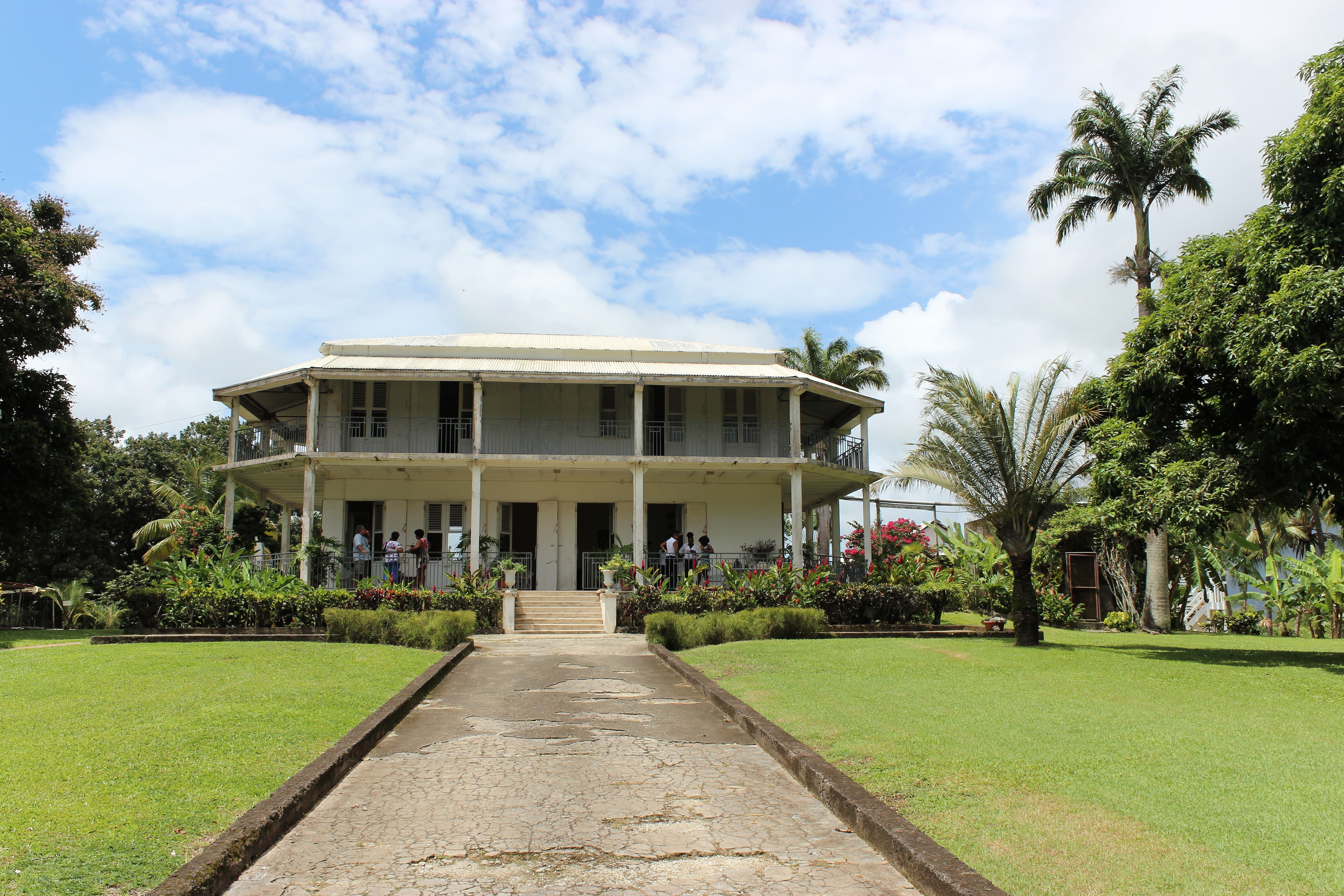
- Habitation Routa, Lamentin

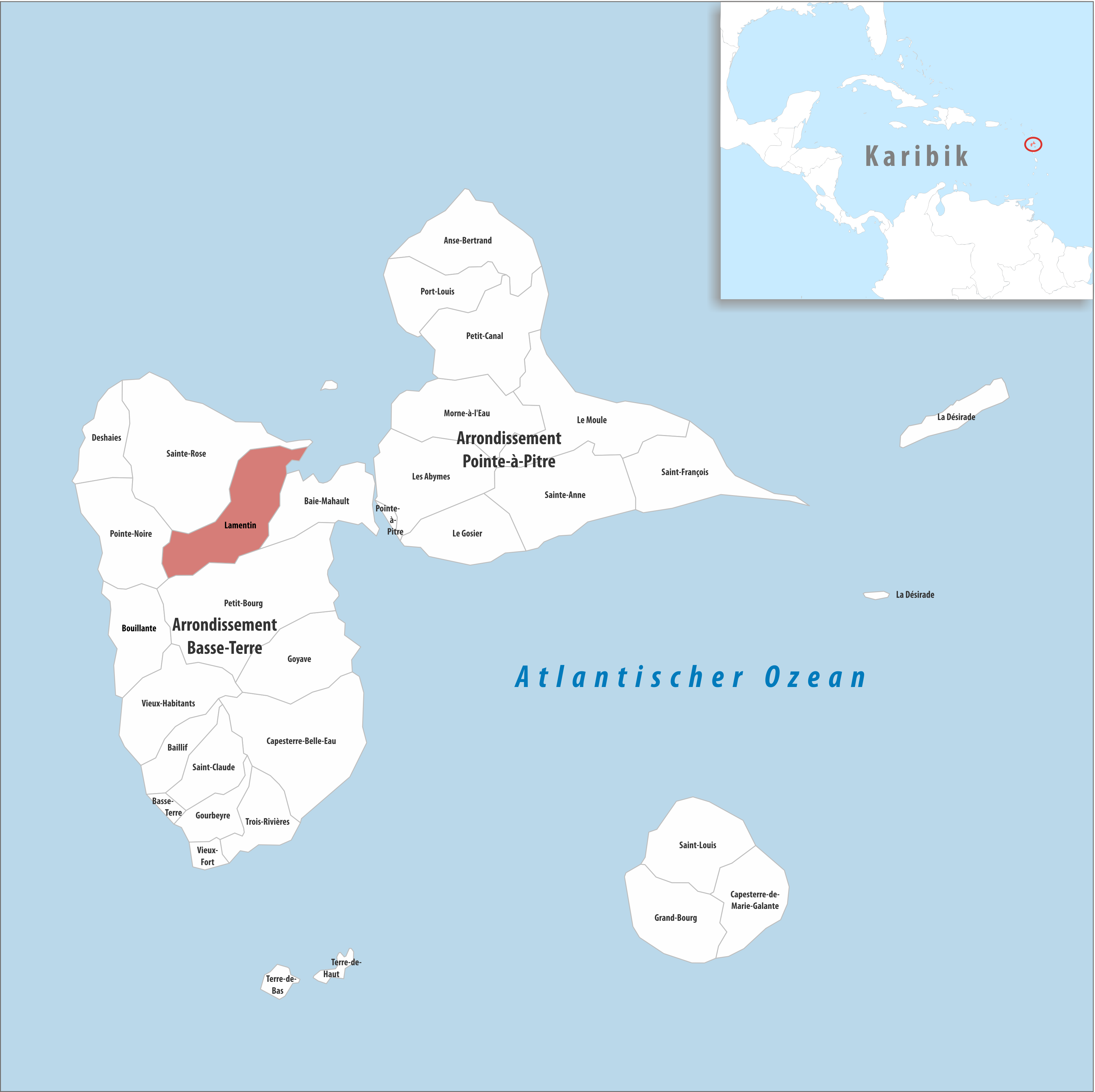
- Location of Lamentin
- Coordinates: 16°16′N 61°38′W
- Country: France
- Overseas region and department: Guadeloupe
- Arrondissement: Basse-Terre
- Canton: Lamentin
- Intercommunality: CA Nord Basse-Terre

Government
  - Mayor (2022–2026): Jocelyn Sapotille
- Area^{1}: 65.60 km^{2} (25.33 sq mi)
- Highest elevation: 0 m (0 ft)
- Lowest elevation: 0 m (0 ft)
- Population (2023): 18,628
  - Density: 284.0/km^{2} (735.5/sq mi)
- Time zone: UTC−04:00 (AST)
- INSEE/Postal code: 97115 /97129
- ^{1} French Land Register data, which excludes lakes, ponds, glaciers > 1 km^{2} (0.386 sq mi or 247 acres) and river estuaries.

Lamentin (French pronunciation: [lamɑ̃tɛ̃]; Guadeloupean Creole: Manten or Lamanten) is a commune in the French overseas department and region of Guadeloupe. It is part of the agglomeration of Pointe-à-Pitre, in the north part of Basse-Terre. Three islets are included in the commune: Christopher, Fajou, Caret.

== History ==
Founded in 1720 in the commune's name comes from a French word for manatee (lamantin), a sea creature which used to inhabit the Lesser Antilles. In the 18th century, the commune underwent a boom, down to coffee, caco, cotton and sugar cane. In 1920, a cyclone destroyed the mayor's office and presbytery, which have since been rebuilt by Ali Tur.

== Population ==
Historical population
| Year | Pop. | ±% p.a. |
|---|---|---|
| 1967 | 8,919 | — |
| 1974 | 9,643 | +1.12% |
| 1982 | 9,885 | +0.31% |
| 1990 | 11,334 | +1.72% |
| 1999 | 13,434 | +1.91% |
| 2007 | 15,785 | +2.04% |
| 2012 | 15,624 | −0.20% |
| 2017 | 16,573 | +1.19% |
| 2023 | 18,628 | +1.97% |
Source: INSEE

== Tourism ==
Lamentin is home to La Ravine Chaude (The hot ravine), a thermal bathing centre.

== Education ==
Public preschools include:

- Ecole maternelle le Verger de Castel
- Ecole maternelle Julien Chabin
- Ecole maternelle Blanche Pierre
- Ecole maternelle Pierrette

Public primary schools include:

- Ecole primaire Bourg 1 Lamentin
- Ecole primaire Bourg 2 Lamentin
- Ecole primaire Castel
- Ecole primaire La Rozière
- Ecole primaire Pierrette
- Ecole primaire Vincent

Public junior high schools include:

- Collège Appel du 18 juin

Public senior high schools include:

- LDM de l'habitat et des services associés Bertène Juminer

== Personalities ==
- René Toribio (1912-1990), politician
