= Goyave =

- Commune
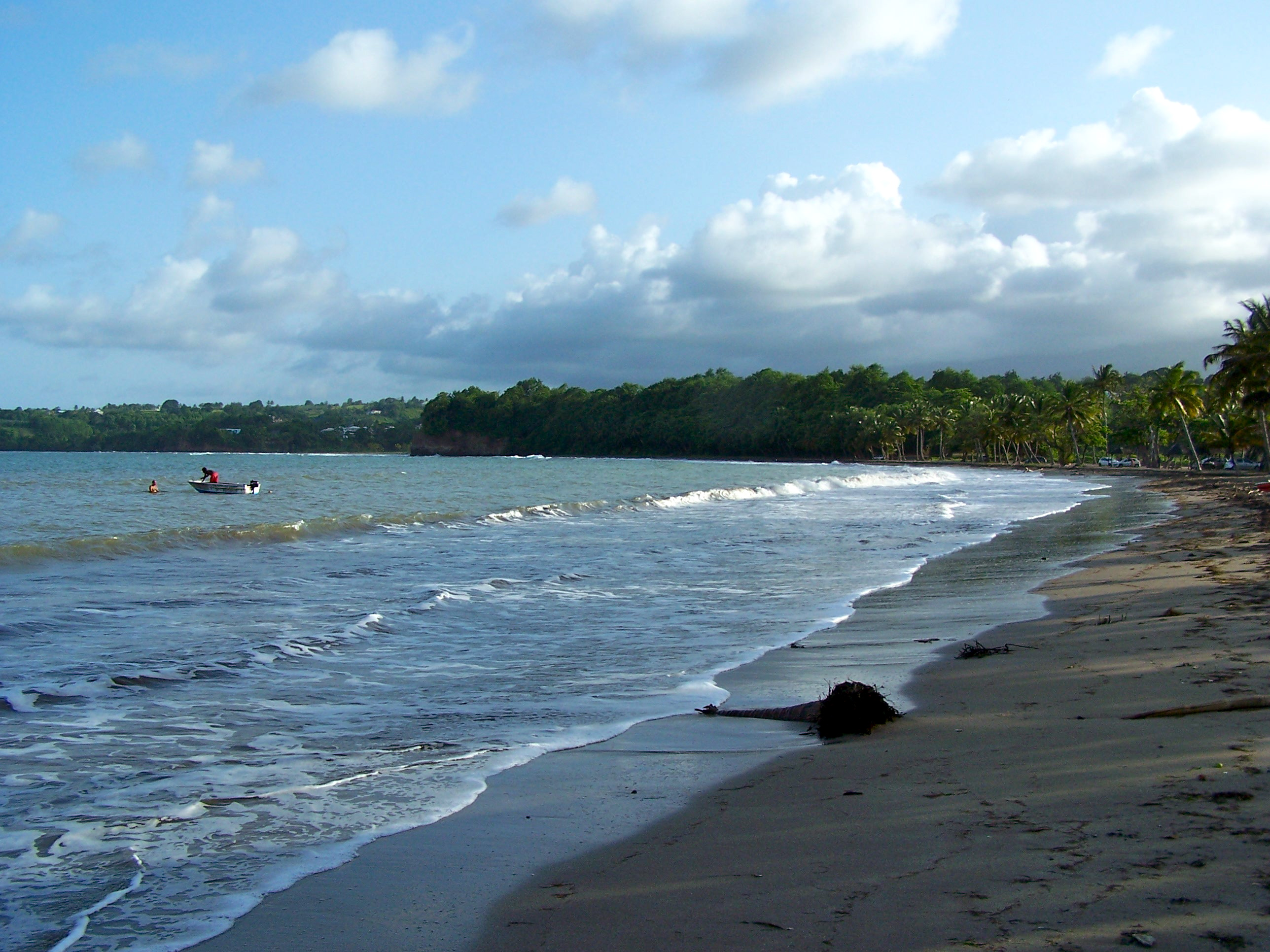
- Sainte-Claire Beach to the south of Goyave

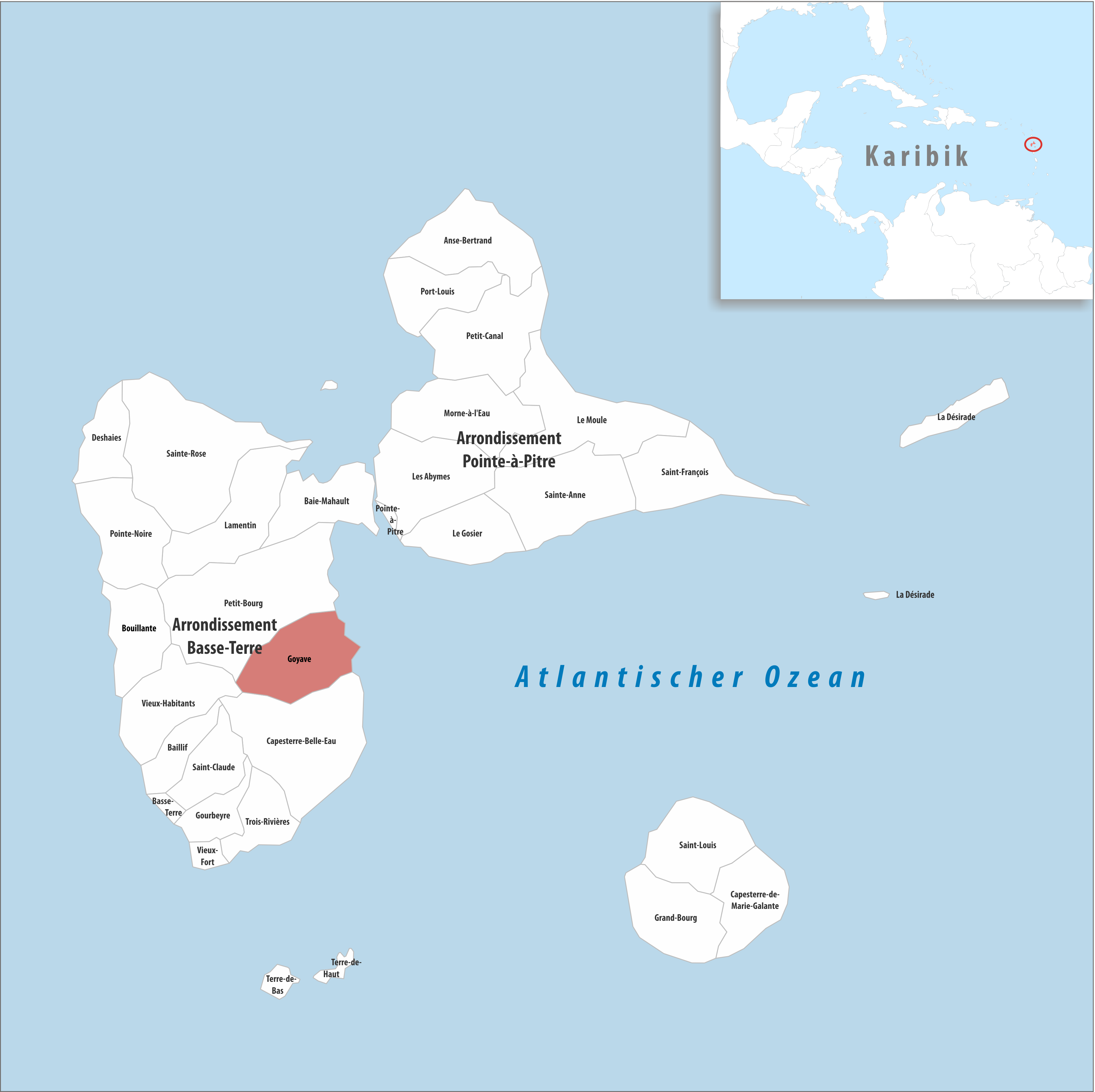
- Location of the commune (in red) within Guadeloupe
- Location of Goyave
- Coordinates: 16°08′N 61°34′W
- Country: France
- Overseas region and department: Guadeloupe
- Arrondissement: Basse-Terre
- Canton: Petit-Bourg
- Intercommunality: CA Nord Basse-Terre

Government
  - Mayor (2020–2026): Ferdy Louisy
- Area^{1}: 59.91 km^{2} (23.13 sq mi)
- Population (2023): 7,565
  - Density: 126.3/km^{2} (327.0/sq mi)
- Time zone: UTC−04:00 (AST)
- INSEE/Postal code: 97114 /97128
- ^{1} French Land Register data, which excludes lakes, ponds, glaciers > 1 km^{2} (0.386 sq mi or 247 acres) and river estuaries.

Goyave (French pronunciation: [ɡwajav], unlike goyave [ɡɔjav]; Guadeloupean Creole: Gwayav) is a commune in the French overseas region and department of Guadeloupe, Lesser Antilles. It is part of the urban area of Pointe-à-Pitre, the largest metropolitan area in Guadeloupe.

== History ==
The parish of Goyave was founded in 1684 under the name of “Sainte-Anne de la petite rivière à Goyave” (Saint Anne of the little river at Guava). Guavas that grow abundantly beside the rivers in this area led the town to adopt its name. Slave labor was commonly used here, when slavery was legal in France, and there were many public executions of rebel slaves here.

== Geography ==
Goyave is located on the eastern part of Basse-Terre Island and the southern section of Goyave is near the Goyave River. Goyave is near Pointe de la Riviere a Goyave and Goyave stretches out along the coast of Petit Cul de Sac Marin. Goyave is on very fertile soil.

== Population ==
Historical population
Year	Pop.	±% p.a.
1967	3,120	—
1974	2,588	−2.64%
1982	2,919	+1.52%
1990	3,652	+2.84%
1999	5,060	+3.69%
2007	7,661	+5.32%
2012	8,079	+1.07%
2017	7,555	−1.33%
2023	7,565	+0.02%
Source: INSEE

== Economy ==
The commune gets its name from the large numbers of guava trees (goyave is the French for guava), which run alongside the river flowing from the mountain. In agriculture, the sugar cane culture has been replaced by bananas and by aquaculture.

== Sights ==
- The Moreau Falls
- The water garden in Blonzac
- The Dull One in Louis
- The Sand Handle
- Ilet Fortune
- The beach of Holy Claire
- The Orchard of 1000 Fruits
- The village O Ti Bouboul (including the agritouristic site, the “magic forest of Moreau”)

== Education ==
Public preschools and primary schools include:

- Ecole primaire François Auguste
- Ecole primaire Groupe scolaire de Bois-Sec
- Ecole maternelle Bourg Goyave

Public junior high schools include:

- Collège Matéliane

== See also ==
- Communes of the Guadeloupe department
