= Jabrun =

Commune in Auvergne-Rhône-Alpes, France

- Commune
- Location of Jabrun
- Location within France Location within Auvergne-Rhône-Alpes
- Coordinates: 44°48′31″N 2°57′42″E
- Country: France
- Region: Auvergne-Rhône-Alpes
- Department: Cantal
- Arrondissement: Saint-Flour
- Canton: Neuvéglise-sur-Truyère
- Intercommunality: Saint-Flour Communauté

Government
  - Mayor (2020–2026): Louis Navech
- Area^{1}: 34.03 km^{2} (13.14 sq mi)
- Elevation: 953 m (3,127 ft)
- Highest elevation: 1,285 m (4,216 ft)
- Lowest elevation: 710 m (2,330 ft)
- Population (2023): 149
  - Density: 4.38/km^{2} (11.3/sq mi)
- Time zone: UTC+01:00 (CET)
  - Summer (DST): UTC+02:00 (CEST)
- INSEE/Postal code: 15078 /15110
- ^{1} French Land Register data, which excludes lakes, ponds, glaciers > 1 km^{2} (0.386 sq mi or 247 acres) and river estuaries.

Jabrun (French pronunciation: [ʒabʁœ̃]) is a commune in the département of Cantal and Auvergne region in south-central France.

== Population ==
Historical population
Year	Pop.	±% p.a.
1968	276	—
1975	214	−3.57%
1982	183	−2.21%
1990	172	−0.77%
1999	178	+0.38%
2007	157	−1.56%
2012	154	−0.39%
2017	155	+0.13%
2023	149	−0.66%
Source: INSEE

== See also ==
- Communes of the Cantal department
