= Arrondissement of Pointe-à-Pitre =

Coordinates: 16°14′15″N 61°31′51″W

Pointe-à-Pitre
- Arrondissement
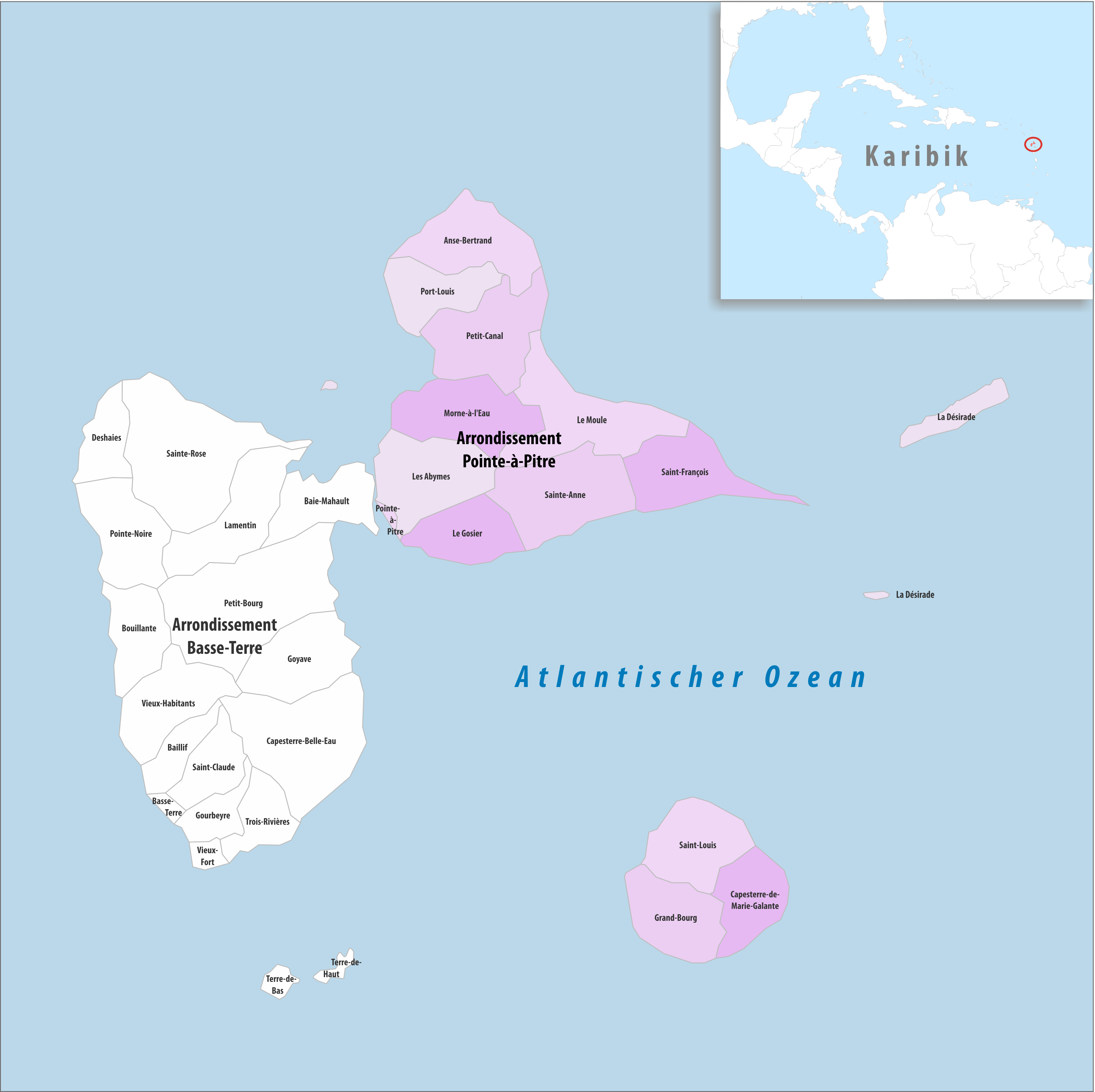
- Location within the region Guadeloupe
- Country: France
- Overseas region and department: Guadeloupe{{{region}}}
- No. of communes: {{{nbcomm}}}
- Area: 774.1 km^{2} (298.9 sq mi)
- Population (2023): 200,896
  - Density: 259.5/km^{2} (672.2/sq mi)
- INSEE code: 9712

The arrondissement of Pointe-à-Pitre is an arrondissement of France in the Guadeloupe department in the Guadeloupe region. It has 14 communes. Its population is 199,303 (2021), and its area is 774.1 km^{2} (298.9 sq mi).

== Composition ==
The communes of the arrondissement of Pointe-à-Pitre, and their INSEE codes, are:

1. Les Abymes (97101)
2. Anse-Bertrand (97102)
3. Capesterre-de-Marie-Galante (97108)
4. La Désirade (97110)
5. Le Gosier (97113)
6. Grand-Bourg (97112)
7. Morne-à-l'Eau (97116)
8. Le Moule (97117)
9. Petit-Canal (97119)
10. Pointe-à-Pitre (97120)
11. Port-Louis (97122)
12. Sainte-Anne (97128)
13. Saint-François (97125)
14. Saint-Louis (97126)

== History ==
The arrondissement of Pointe-à-Pitre was established in 1947.

As a result of the reorganisation of the cantons of France which came into effect in 2015, the borders of the cantons are no longer related to the borders of the arrondissements. The cantons of the arrondissement of Pointe-à-Pitre were, as of January 2015:

1. Les Abymes-1
2. Les Abymes-2
3. Les Abymes-3
4. Les Abymes-4
5. Les Abymes-5
6. Anse-Bertrand
7. Capesterre-de-Marie-Galante
8. La Désirade
9. Le Gosier-1
10. Le Gosier-2
11. Grand-Bourg
12. Morne-à-l'Eau-1
13. Morne-à-l'Eau-2
14. Le Moule-1
15. Le Moule-2
16. Petit-Canal
17. Pointe-à-Pitre-1
18. Pointe-à-Pitre-2
19. Pointe-à-Pitre-3
20. Sainte-Anne-1
21. Sainte-Anne-2
22. Saint-François
23. Saint-Louis
