= Canton of Pointe-à-Pitre =

Canton of Guadeloupe, France

Coordinates: 16.239°N 61.536°W

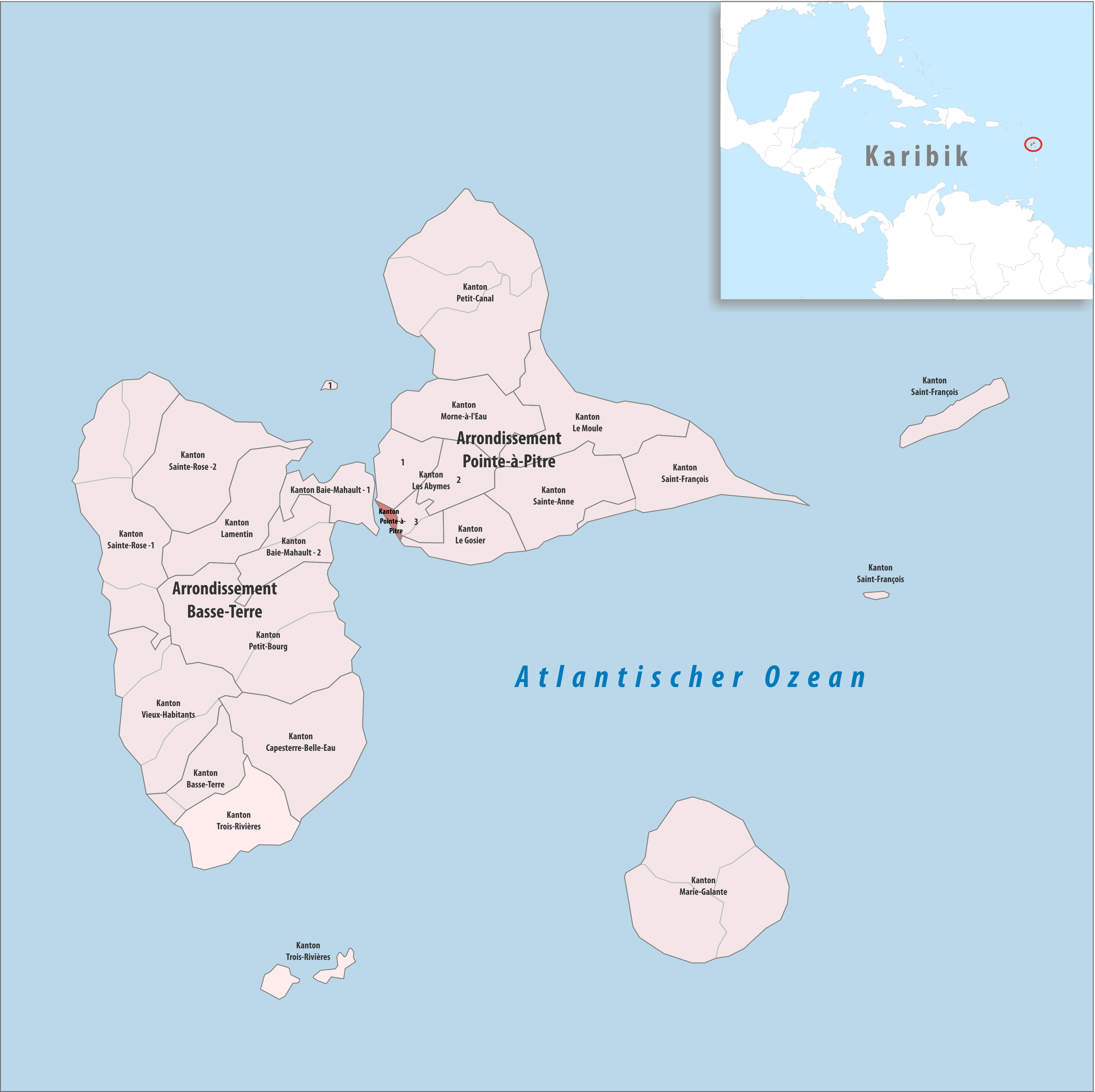

The canton of Pointe-à-Pitre is an administrative division of Guadeloupe, an overseas department and region of France. It was created at the French canton reorganisation which came into effect in March 2015. Its seat is in Pointe-à-Pitre.

It consists of the following communes:

1. Pointe-à-Pitre
