= Cantons of the Guadeloupe department =

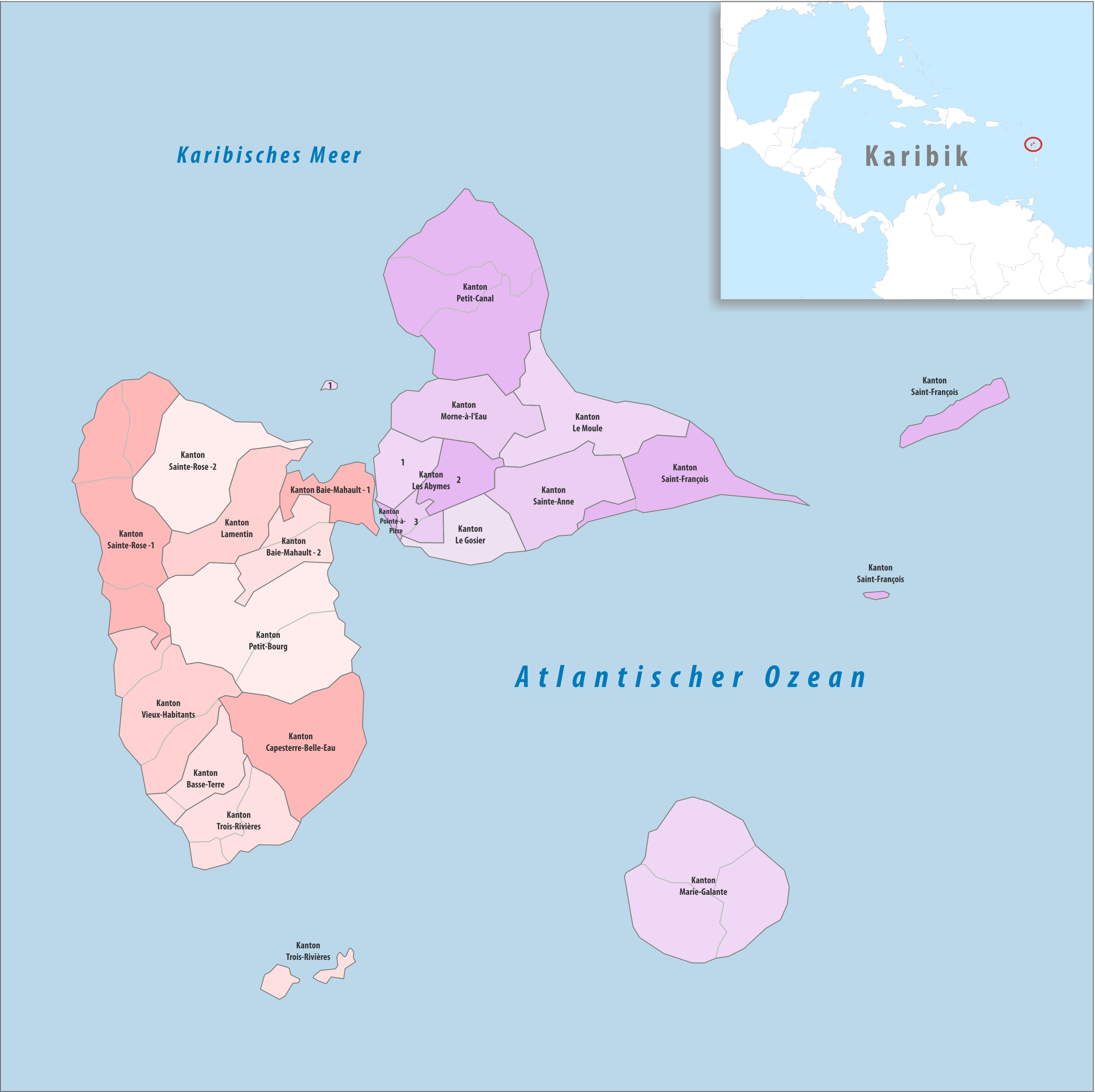

The following is a list of the 21 cantons of the Guadeloupe department, in France, following the French canton reorganisation which came into effect in March of 2015:

- Les Abymes-1
- Les Abymes-2
- Les Abymes-3
- Baie-Mahault-1
- Baie-Mahault-2
- Basse-Terre
- Capesterre-Belle-Eau
- Le Gosier
- Lamentin
- Marie-Galante
- Morne-à-l'Eau
- Le Moule
- Petit-Bourg
- Petit-Canal
- Pointe-à-Pitre
- Sainte-Anne
- Sainte-Rose-1
- Sainte-Rose-2
- Saint-François
- Trois-Rivières
- Vieux-Habitants

== Saint-Martin-Saint-Barthélemy ==
The arrondissement of Saint-Martin-Saint-Barthélemy was part of the department of Guadeloupe until 22 February 2007, when the communes of Saint-Martin and Saint-Barthélemy were detached from Guadeloupe. It was made up of three cantons:

- Saint-Barthélemy
- Saint-Martin 1st Canton
- Saint-Martin 2nd Canton

This arrondissement and these cantons ceased to exist on 22 February 2007.
