= Arrondissements of the Guadeloupe department =

Administrative divisions of Guadeloupe, France

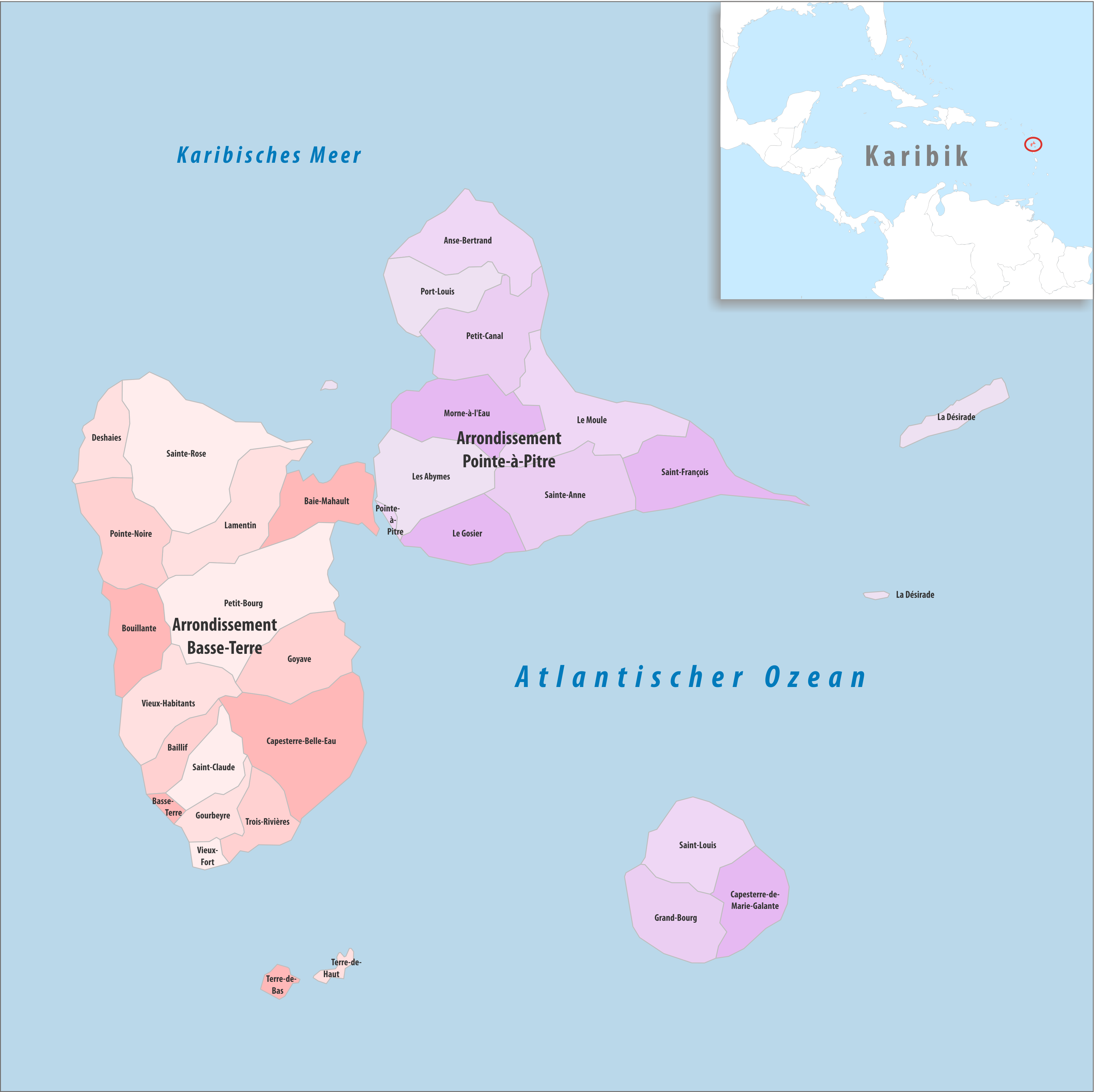
Map of the arrondissements of Guadeloupe.

The 2 arrondissements of the Guadeloupe department are:

1. Arrondissement of Basse-Terre, (prefecture of the Guadeloupe department: Basse-Terre) with 18 communes. The population of the arrondissement was 185,012 in 2021.
2. Arrondissement of Pointe-à-Pitre, (subprefecture: Pointe-à-Pitre) with 14 communes. The population of the arrondissement was 199,303 in 2021.

== History ==
The arrondissements of Basse-Terre and Pointe-à-Pitre were established in 1947. The arrondissement of Saint-Martin-Saint-Barthélemy, containing the communes of Saint-Martin and Saint-Barthélemy, was created in 1963 from part of the arrondissement of Basse-Terre. This arrondissement was disbanded when Saint-Martin and Saint-Barthélemy became separate overseas collectivities in February 2007.

== See also ==
- Cantons of the Guadeloupe department
- Communes of the Guadeloupe department
