= Communes of the Guadeloupe department =

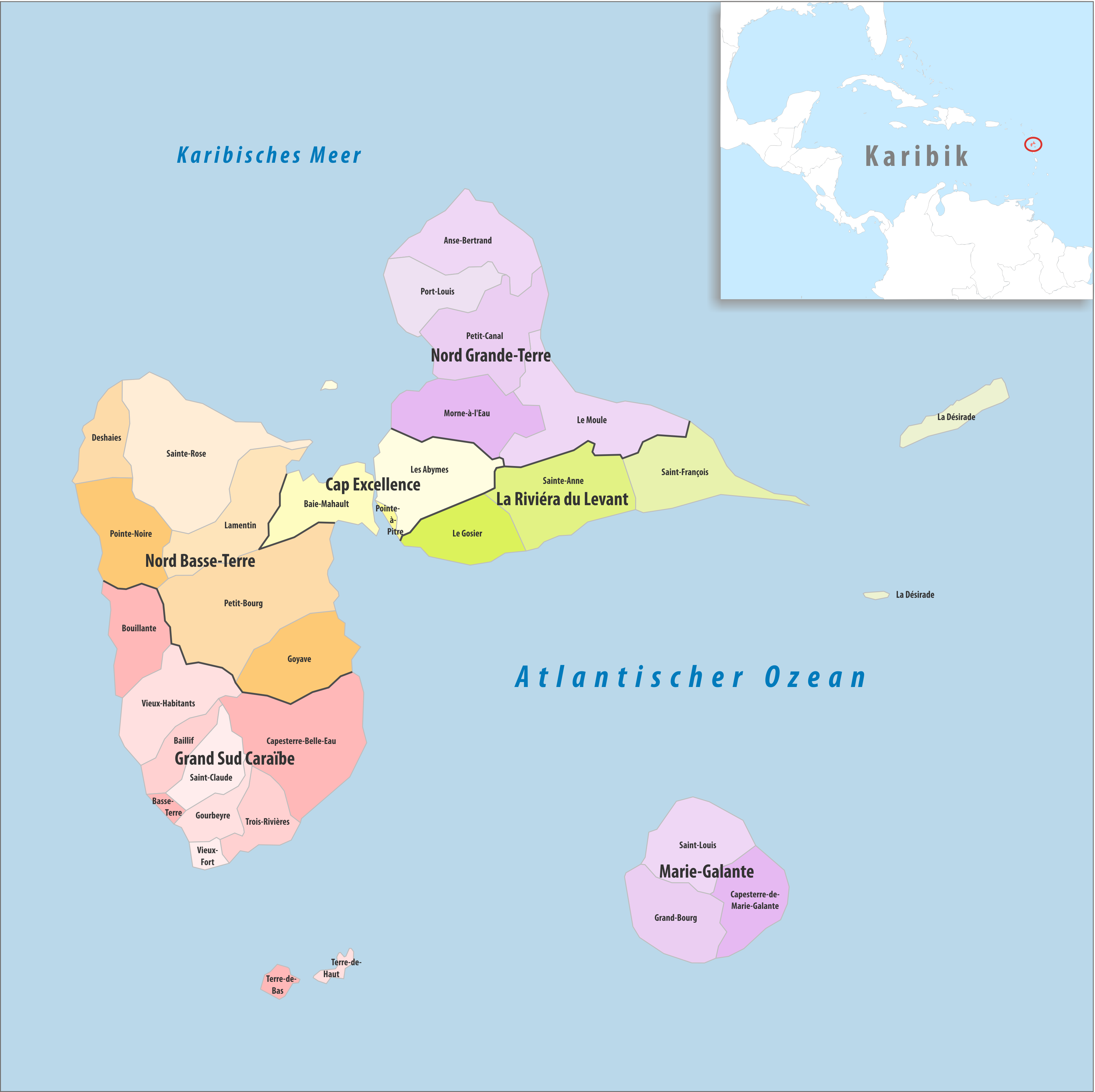

The following is a list of the 32 communes of the Guadeloupe overseas department of France.

The communes cooperate in the following intercommunalities (as of 2025):

- Communauté d'agglomération CAP Excellence
- Communauté d'agglomération Grand Sud Caraïbe
- Communauté d'agglomération du Nord Basse-Terre
- Communauté d'agglomération du Nord Grande-Terre
- Communauté d'agglomération La Riviéra du Levant
- Communauté de communes de Marie-Galante

INSEE Code	Postal Code	Commune name	Mayor	Population (1999)
97101	97139	Les Abymes	Éric Jalton	63054
97102	97121	Anse-Bertrand	Edouard Delta	5028
97103	97122	Baie-Mahault	Hélène Polifonte Molia	29980
97104	97123	Baillif	Marie-Yveline Ponchateau-Théobald	6315
97105	97100	Basse-Terre	André Atallah	12410
97106	97125	Bouillante	Thierry Abelli	7336
97107	97130	Capesterre-Belle-Eau	Jean-Philippe Courtois	19599
97108	97140	Capesterre-de-Marie-Galante	Jean-Claude Maes	3563
97111	97126	Deshaies	Jeanny Marc	4043
97110	97127	La Désirade	Loïc Claude Tonton	1621
97113	97190	Le Gosier	Liliane Moutout	25308
97109	97113	Gourbeyre	Claude Edmond	7632
97114	97128	Goyave	Ferdy Louisy	5040
97112	97112	Grand-Bourg	Maryse Etzol	5893
97115	97129	Lamentin	Jocelyn Sapotille	13414
97116	97111	Morne-à-l'Eau	Jean Barbail	17136
97117	97160	Le Moule	Gabrielle Louis-Carabin	22913
97118	97170	Petit-Bourg	David Nebor	20510
97119	97131	Petit-Canal	Blaise Mornal	7746
97120	97110	Pointe-à-Pitre	Harry Durimel	20931
97121	97116	Pointe-Noire	Camille Elisabeth	7689
97122	97117	Port-Louis	Jean-Marie Hubert	5573
97124	97120	Saint-Claude	Lucie Weck-Mirre	10191
97125	97118	Saint-François	Jean-Luc Perrian	10674
97126	97134	Saint-Louis	Francois Navis	2997
97128	97180	Sainte-Anne	Francs Baptiste	20385
97129	97115	Sainte-Rose	Adrien Baron	17605
97130	97136	Terre-de-Bas	Rolande Nadille-Vala	1267
97131	97137	Terre-de-Haut	Louly Bonbon	1729
97132	97114	Trois-Rivières	Jean-Louis Francisque	8732
97133	97141	Vieux-Fort	Héric André	1603
97134	97119	Vieux-Habitants	Jules Otto	7611

Former communes detached from Guadeloupe on 22 February 2007:

INSEE code	Postal code	Commune name
97123	97133	Saint-Barthélemy
97127	97150	Saint-Martin
