= Joël Beaugendre =

Guadeloupean politician (1950–2024)

Member of the National Assembly for Guadeloupe's 3rd constituency
- In office 19 June 2002 – 19 June 2007
- Preceded by: Leo Andy
- Succeeded by: Jeanny Marc

Personal details
- Born: 19 January 1950; Saint-Claude, Guadeloupe
- Died: 11 May 2024 (aged 74); Capesterre-Belle-Eau, Guadeloupe
- Political party: DVD; UMP
- Profession: General practitioner

Joël Beaugendre (French pronunciation: [ʒɔ.ɛl boʒɑ̃dʁ]; 19 January 1950 – 11 May 2024) was a French politician who served as a member of the French National Assembly from 2002 until 2007 for the Union for a Popular Movement. Born in Saint-Claude, Guadeloupe on 19 January 1950, he died on 11 May 2024, at the age of 74.

== Biography ==
Beaugendre was the mayor of Capesterre-Belle-Eau from 1995 to 2020, which overlapped with his time in several other offices, the first two as Guadeloupe's regional councillor from 1992 to 1998 and then departmental councillor for Capesterre-Belle-Eau 2nd Canton from March 1998 until his resignation in January 2002. On 16 June 2002, Beaugendre was elected as a deputy to the Twelfth Legislature of the French Republic (2002-2007) in Guadeloupe's third electoral district. He was part of the Union for a Popular Movement (Union pour un mouvement populaire; UMP). At the next election, however, held on 17 June 2007, he was beaten in the second round of voting by left-wing rival Jeanny Marc.

Taking advantage of a split in the Socialist Party, he got himself reelected mayor of Capesterre-Belle-Eau in March 2008 with 62.16% of the ballots cast in the second round of voting. Three years later, in March 2011, he found himself with a seat on the Departmental Council of Guadeloupe, after having been elected in Capesterre-Belle-Eau 1st Canton. He also held on to his mayoralty in the wake of Guadeloupe's 2014 municipal elections, securing 53.65% of the ballots cast in the second round of voting. In February 2019, he succeeded Lucette Michaux-Chevry to the presidency of the communauté d'agglomération Grand Sud Caraïbe.

At Guadeloupe's 2020 municipal elections, Beaugendre lost in the second round of voting to Jean-Philippe Courtois, putting to an end to his more than 25-year tenure in the Capesterre-Belle-Eau mayor's office.

Beaugendre died on 11 May 2024 in his native Guadeloupe at the age of 74.

== Legal proceedings ==
In 2014, Beaugendre faced charges in a financial affair and was placed in provisional detention.

In September 2014, his lawyer secured his release under judiciary supervision.

== Sources ==
- Page on the French National Assembly website (in French)
