= Guadeloupe's 3rd constituency =

Constituency of the French Fifth Republic

3rd constituency of Guadeloupe
- inline Constituency of the National Assembly of France

- Deputy: Max Mathiasin; DVG
- Department: Guadeloupe
- Registered voters: 83,684

The 3rd constituency of Guadeloupe is a French legislative constituency in Guadeloupe, an insular region of France located in the Leeward Islands.

Since 2017, it is represented by Max Mathiasin an unaligned left wing (Miscellaneous left) deputy.

== Deputies ==
Election	Member	Party
1988	Dominique Larifla	PS
1993	Édouard Chammougon	RPR
1995	Leo Andy	PS
1997	Leo Andy	PS
2002	Joël Beaugendre	UMP
2007	Jeanny Marc	PS
2012	Ary Chalus	PS
2017	Max Mathiasin	DVG
2022	Max Mathiasin	DVG

== Election results ==
=== 2024 ===
Candidate	Party or alliance		First round		Second round	
Candidate	Party or alliance		Votes	%	Votes	%
Max Mathiasin	Miscellaneous left	Independent	10,672	36.21	21,715	69.15
Rody Tolassy	National Rally		7,635	25.90	9,687	30.85
Nicolas Citadelle	New Popular Front	Socialist Party	4,361	14.80		
Fred Deshayes	Miscellaneous left	Independent	3,381	11.47		
Eric Coriolan	Regionalists	Independent	1,644	5.58		
Christopher Petitfond	Miscellaneous centre	Independent	601	2.04		
Sidjie Esdras	Far-left	Lutte Ouvrière	545	1.85		
Bernard Abdoul-Maninroudine	Independent		271	0.92		
Christèle Pignac	Reconquête		191	0.65		
Francis Lalanne	Far-right	Independent	173	0.59		
Total			29,474	100.00	31,402	100.00
Valid votes			29,474	95.28	31,402	94.84
Invalid votes			766	2.48	909	2.75
Blank votes			694	2.24	799	2.41
Total votes			30,934	100.00	33,110	100.00
Registered voters/turnout			85,766	36.07	85,777	38.60

=== 2022 ===
Candidate	Label	First round		Second round	
Candidate	Label	Votes	%	Votes	%
Rody Tolassy	RN	4,164	20.09	11,393	47.88
Max Mathiasin	DVG	3,508	16.93	12,402	52.12
Ferdy Louisy	GUSR	2,917	14.07		
Sylvie Chammougon Anno	PS	1,924	9.28		
Marie-Laure Aigle	LFI	1,731	8.35		
Raphaël Lapin	DVG	1,711	8.26		
José Toribio	DVG	1,417	6.84		
Hubert Quiaba	EELV	945	4.56		
Fauvert Savan	DIV	506	2.44		
Fabrice Luce	DIV	397	1.92		
Félix Alain Flémin	PCF	389	1.88		
Grégory Cabrion	GGDN	329	1.59		
Sidjie Esdras	CO	267	1.29		
Delphine Pierquin	LR	258	1.24		
Christian-Georges Henry-Léo	DIV	110	0.53		
Paul Éric Confiac	GPRG	106	0.51		
Béatrice Gama	UDI	28	0.14		
René Claude Argis	DIV	16	0.08		
Prévert Mayengo	REC	2	0.01		
Gilbert Edinval	DIV	0	0.00		
Votes		20,725	100.00	23,795	100.00
Valid votes		20,725	94.10	23,795	97.94
Blank votes		661	3.00	889	1.05
Null votes		639	2.90	848	1.01
Turnout		22,025	26.11	25,532	30.27
Abstentions		62,323	73.89	58,807	69.73
Registered voters		84,348		83,438	
Source: Ministry of the Interior

=== 2017 ===
Candidate	Label	First round		Second round	
Candidate	Label	Votes	%	Votes	%
Nestor Luce	LREM	2,621	14.76	6,764	34.85
Max Mathiasin	DVG	2,295	12.93	12,645	65.15
Ferdy Louisy	PS	1,792	10.09		
José Toribio	DVG	1,768	9.96		
Adrien Baron	PS	1,723	9.70		
Hubert Quiaba	DVG	1,017	5.73		
Sylvie Chammougon-Anno	LR	1,009	5.68		
Céline Dechelette	LFI	946	5.33		
Fauvert Savan	DIV	841	4.74		
Ary Broussillon	DVG	756	4.26		
Samuel Cazomont	DIV	637	3.59		
Edwing Laupen Mondongue	DVG	568	3.20		
Rody Tolassy	FN	471	2.65		
Félix-Alain Flémin	PCF	415	2.34		
Jean Morandais	DIV	243	1.37		
Richard Nebor	DVG	218	1.23		
Marie-Agnès Castrot	EXG	130	0.73		
Paul Confiac	DVG	91	0.51		
Jessy Raoelison	DIV	77	0.43		
Jade Gallet	LFQO	65	0.37		
Sylvain Porlon	DVD	40	0.23		
Gilbert Edinval	DIV	33	0.19		
Éric Madachon	DIV	0	0.00		
Votes		17,756	100.00	19,409	100.00
Valid votes		17,756	91.40	19,409	88.14
Blank votes		855	4.40	1,273	5.78
Null votes		815	4.20	1,339	6.08
Turnout		19,426	23.21	22,021	26.31
Abstentions		64,262	76.79	61,663	73.69
Registered voters		83,688		83,684	
Source: Ministry of the Interior

=== 2012 ===
2012 legislative election in Guadeloupe's 3rd constituency
Candidate	Party	First round		Second round	
Candidate	Party	Votes	%	Votes	%
Ary Chalus	PS	10,382	40.81%	15,665	51.15%
Max Mathiasin	PS	6,276	24.67%	14,963	48.85%
Jeanny Marc	PS	6,238	24.52%		
Anne Legras	FN	717	2.82%		
Jim Lapin	NC	642	2.52%		
Gérard Uneau	EELV	604	2.37%		
Francis Pauloby	DVD	363	1.43%		
Lita Dahomay	CO	219	0.86%		
Valid votes		25,441	95.09%	30,628	93.94%
Spoilt and null votes		1,314	4.91%	1,975	6.06%
Votes cast / turnout		26,755	34.76%	32,603	42.38%
Abstentions		50,211	65.24%	44,322	57.62%
Registered voters		76,966	100.00%	76,925	100.00%

== Sources ==
Official results of French elections from 2002: "Résultats électoraux officiels en France" (in French).
