= 2024 French legislative election in Guadeloupe =

Following the first round of the 2024 French legislative election on 30 June 2024, runoff elections in each constituency where no candidate received a vote share greater than 50 percent were scheduled for 7 July. Candidates permitted to stand in the runoff elections needed to either come in first or second place in the first round or achieve more than 12.5 percent of the votes of the entire electorate (as opposed to 12.5 percent of the vote share due to low turnout).

== Guadeloupe ==
=== 1st constituency ===
Candidate	Party or alliance		First round		Second round	
Candidate	Party or alliance		Votes	%	Votes	%
Olivier Serva	Miscellaneous left	Utiles	12,042	51.40	18,043	77.59
Chantal Lerus	Miscellaneous left	Independent	2,965	12.65	5,211	22.41
Marvyn Martol	New Popular Front	Socialist Party	2,531	10.80		
Tarius Royer	National Rally		2,252	9.61		
Laurence Maquiaba	Regionalists	Independent	1,583	6.76		
Alix Nabajoth	Miscellaneous left	Independent	1,102	4.70		
Danielle Diakok	Far-left	Lutte Ouvrière	336	1.43		
Dieudonné Mbala Mbala	Independent		241	1.03		
Rudy Fiacre Faro	The Republicans	The Centrists	197	0.84		
Tony Rebus	Independent	Regionalists	104	0.44		
Rosemary Armantrading	Reconquête		77	0.33		
Total			23,430	100.00	23,254	100.00
Valid votes			23,430	95.00	23,254	92.15
Invalid votes			703	2.85	1,128	4.47
Blank votes			529	2.15	854	3.38
Total votes			24,662	100.00	25,236	100.00
Registered voters/turnout			75,757	32.55	75,767	33.31

=== 2nd constituency ===
Candidate	Party or alliance		First round		Second round	
Candidate	Party or alliance		Votes	%	Votes	%
Christian Baptiste	Miscellaneous left	Progressive Democratic Party of Guadeloupe	10,903	41.33	19,801	72.38
Laurent Petit	National Rally		4,563	17.30	7,557	27.62
Blaise Aldo	Miscellaneous right	Independent	2,291	8.68		
Priscilla Sylvestre	Independent		1,895	7.18		
Ludovic Tolassy	Regionalists	Independent	1,761	6.68		
Steve Salim	Independent	Ecologists	1,685	6.39		
Michel Tola	Miscellaneous left	Independent	1,551	5.88		
Patrick Marcellin Galas	Miscellaneous centre	Independent	698	2.65		
José Ayassami	Independent		324	1.23		
Steeve Cirederf-Rouyar	New Popular Front	Miscellaneous left	226	0.86		
Roseline Chatelot	Independent		182	0.69		
Pamela Pommier	Far-right	Independent	173	0.66		
Raymond Molia	Independent		126	0.48		
Moïse Ayassamy	Miscellaneous left	Independent	2	0.01		
Total			26,380	100.00	27,358	100.00
Valid votes			26,380	93.56	27,358	93.30
Invalid votes			950	3.37	996	3.40
Blank votes			865	3.07	968	3.30
Total votes			28,195	100.00	29,322	100.00
Registered voters/turnout			88,708	31.78	88,702	33.06

=== 3rd constituency ===
Candidate	Party or alliance		First round		Second round	
Candidate	Party or alliance		Votes	%	Votes	%
Max Mathiasin	Miscellaneous left	Independent	10,672	36.21	21,715	69.15
Rody Tolassy	National Rally		7,635	25.90	9,687	30.85
Nicolas Citadelle	New Popular Front	Socialist Party	4,361	14.80		
Fred Deshayes	Miscellaneous left	Independent	3,381	11.47		
Eric Coriolan	Regionalists	Independent	1,644	5.58		
Christopher Petitfond	Miscellaneous centre	Independent	601	2.04		
Sidjie Esdras	Far-left	Lutte Ouvrière	545	1.85		
Bernard Abdoul-Maninroudine	Independent		271	0.92		
Christèle Pignac	Reconquête		191	0.65		
Francis Lalanne	Far-right	Independent	173	0.59		
Total			29,474	100.00	31,402	100.00
Valid votes			29,474	95.28	31,402	94.84
Invalid votes			766	2.48	909	2.75
Blank votes			694	2.24	799	2.41
Total votes			30,934	100.00	33,110	100.00
Registered voters/turnout			85,766	36.07	85,777	38.60

=== 4th constituency ===
Candidate	Party or alliance		First round		Second round	
Candidate	Party or alliance		Votes	%	Votes	%
Elie Califer	New Popular Front	Socialist Party	12,617	57.89	15,068	71.09
Jennifer Linon	Regionalists	Miscellaneous centre	4,763	21.85	6,127	28.91
Lydie Marie Monthouël	National Rally		2,572	11.80		
Jean-Marie Nomertin	Far-left	Lutte Ouvrière	1,396	6.41		
Claudia Boucher	Independent	The Republicans	225	1.03		
Paola Plantier	Reconquête		221	1.01		
Total			21,794	100.00	21,195	100.00
Valid votes			21,794	93.78	21,195	92.51
Invalid votes			863	3.71	1,000	4.36
Blank votes			582	2.50	716	3.13
Total votes			23,239	100.00	22,911	100.00
Registered voters/turnout			68,730	33.81	68,702	33.35
