= Mathiasin =

Mathiasin is a French surname. Notable people with the surname include:

- Jeanny Marc-Mathiasin (born 1950), French politician
- Max Mathiasin (born 1956), French politician
