= Canton of Pointe-Noire =

Coordinates: 16°14′04″N 61°46′56″W

Pointe-Noire
- Former canton
- Interactive map of Pointe-Noire
- Country: France
- Overseas region and department: Guadeloupe{{{region}}}
- No. of communes: {{{nbcomm}}}
- Disbanded: 2015
- Area: 60 km^{2} (23 sq mi)
- Population (2012): 6,785
  - Density: 110/km^{2} (290/sq mi)

The Canton of Pointe-Noire is a former canton in the Arrondissement of Basse-Terre on the island of Guadeloupe. It had 6,785 inhabitants (2012). It was disbanded following the French canton reorganisation which came into effect in March 2015. It comprised the commune of Pointe-Noire, which joined the canton of Sainte-Rose-1 in 2015.

== See also ==
- Cantons of Guadeloupe
- Communes of Guadeloupe
- Arrondissements of Guadeloupe
