= Guadeloupe's 1st constituency =

Constituency of the French Fifth Republic

1st constituency of Guadeloupe
- inline Constituency of the National Assembly of France

- Deputy: Olivier Serva; GUSR
- Department: Guadeloupe
- Registered voters: 76,241

The 1st constituency of Guadeloupe is a French legislative constituency in Guadeloupe, an insular region of France located in the Leeward Islands.

Since 2017, its representative has been Olivier Serva; he represented La République En Marche! in 2017 and GUSR in 2022.

== Deputies ==
Election	Member	Party
1988	Frédéric Jalton	PS
1993	Frédéric Jalton	PS
1997	Daniel Marsin	PS
2002	Éric Jalton	DVG
2007	Éric Jalton	DVG
2012	Éric Jalton	DVG
2017	Olivier Serva	LREM
2022	Olivier Serva	GUSR

== Election results ==
=== 2024 ===
Candidate	Party	Alliance	First round		Second round	
Candidate	Party	Alliance	Votes	%	Votes	%
Olivier Serva	Utiles	DVG	12,042	51.40	18,043	77.59
Chantal Lerus	Ind	DVG	2,965	12.65	5,211	22.41
Marvyn Martol	PS	NFP	2,531	10.80		
Tarious Royer	RN		2,252	9.61		
Laurence Maquiaba	Ind		1,583	6.76		
Alix Nabajoth	Ind	DVG	1,102	4.70		
Danielle Diakok	LO		336	1.43		
Dieudonné M'bala M'bala	Ind		241	1.03		
Rudy Fiacre Faro	LR	LC	197	0.84		
Tony Rebus	Ind		104	0.44		
Rosemary Armantrading	R!		77	0.33		
Valid votes			23,430	95.00	23,254	92.15
Blank votes			529	2.15	854	3.38
Null votes			703	2.85	1,128	4.47
Turnout			24,662	32.55	25,236	33.31
Abstentions			51,095	67.45	50,531	66.69
Registered voters			75,757		75,767	
Result			U HOLD			

=== 2022 ===
Candidate	Label	First round		Second round	
Candidate	Label	Votes	%	Votes	%
Olivier Serva	GUSR	7,766	43.44	15,624	74.04
Dominique Biras	DVG	2,685	15.02	5,478	25.96
Nadège Montout	LFI	2,364	13.22		
Rosan Rauzduel	PPDG	2,332	13.04		
Thierry Fabulas	RN	1,237	6.92		
Francillonne Jacoby-Koaly	LFI	795	4.45		
Christian Civilise	EELV	266	1.49		
Raphaël Cécé	CO	245	1.37		
Rudy Faro	LC	78	0.44		
Henri Angol	GPRG	58	0.32		
Marie Smite	UDI	51	0.29		
Éric Jean-Philippe	DIV	0	0.00		
Votes		17,877	100.00	21,102	100.00
Valid votes		17,877	93.71	21,102	91.65
Blank votes		525	2.75	799	3.47
Null votes		674	3.53	1,124	4.88
Turnout		19,076	25.11	23,025	30.31
Abstentions		56,903	74.89	52,948	69.69
Registered voters		75,979		75,979	
Source: Ministry of the Interior

=== 2017 ===
Candidate	Label	First round		Second round	
Candidate	Label	Votes	%	Votes	%
Olivier Serva	LREM	8,248	43.70	14,648	61.74
Rosan Rauzduel	PPDG	4,728	25.05	9,078	38.26
Harry Durimel	EELV	3,183	16.86		
Georges Hermin	PS	1,051	5.57		
Nadège Montout	LFI	616	3.26		
Alix Huyghues-Beaufond	LR	232	1.23		
Jessica Compper	UDI	192	1.02		
Danielle Diakok	EXG	178	0.94		
Nico Italique	DVG	127	0.67		
Yves Pierre-Justin	DIV	90	0.48		
Henri Angol	DIV	68	0.36		
Emmanuel Robeiri	DIV	66	0.35		
Rudy Faro	DVD	49	0.26		
Christian Treber	DVG	32	0.17		
Mikael Lech	DIV	16	0.08		
Votes		18,876	100.00	23,726	100.00
Valid votes		18,876	92.01	23,726	89.62
Blank votes		746	3.64	1,024	3.87
Null votes		893	4.35	1,725	6.52
Turnout		20,515	26.91	26,475	34.73
Abstentions		55,726	73.09	49,758	65.27
Registered voters		76,241		76,233	
Source: Ministry of the Interior

=== 2012 ===
2012 legislative election in Guadeloupe's 1st constituency
Candidate	Party	First round		Second round	
Candidate	Party	Votes	%	Votes	%
Eric Jalton	DVG	11,346	55.46	16,037	66.83
Harry Durimel	EELV	3,163	15.46	7,969	33.21
Daniel Marsin	LGM	2,223	10.87		
Louis Galantine	PS	2,094	10.24		
Sully Tacite	PCD	527	2.58		
Francillonne Jacoby-Koaly	DVG	440	2.15		
Colette Bouchain	FN	359	1.75		
Danielle Diakok	CO	306	1.50		
Valid votes		20,458	91.99	23,996	90.78
Spoilt and null votes		1,781	8.01	2,438	9.22
Votes cast / turnout		22,239	30.38	26,434	36.12
Abstentions		50,956	69.62	46,743	63.88
Registered voters		73,195	100.00	73,177	100.00

== Sources ==
- Official results of French elections from 2002: "Résultats électoraux officiels en France" (in French).
