= Capesterre-Belle-Eau 1st Canton =

Coordinates: 16.0510°N 61.5657°W

Capesterre-Belle-Eau-1
- Former canton
- Interactive map of Capesterre-Belle-Eau-1
- Country: France
- Overseas region and department: Guadeloupe{{{region}}}
- No. of communes: {{{nbcomm}}}
- Disbanded: 2015
- Population (2012): 6,704

Capesterre-Belle-Eau 1st Canton is a former canton in the Arrondissement of Basse-Terre on the island of Guadeloupe. It had 6,704 inhabitants (2012). It was disbanded following the French canton reorganisation which came into effect in March 2015. It comprised part of the commune of Capesterre-Belle-Eau, which joined the new canton of Capesterre-Belle-Eau in 2015.

== See also ==
- Cantons of Guadeloupe
- Communes of Guadeloupe
- Arrondissements of Guadeloupe
