= Guadeloupe's 4th constituency =

Constituency of the French Fifth Republic

4th constituency of Guadeloupe
- inline Constituency of the National Assembly of France

- Deputy: Élie Califer; PS
- Department: Guadeloupe

The 4th constituency of Guadeloupe (French: Quatrième circonscription de la Guadeloupe) is a French legislative Constituency in the Overseas department of Guadeloupe. Since 2022, is represented by Élie Califer of the Socialist Party. Guadeloupe's fourth constituency consists of Les Saintes and southern Basse-Terre.

== Deputies ==
Election	Member	Party
1988	Lucette Michaux-Chevry	RPR
1993	Lucette Michaux-Chevry	RPR
1997	Philippe Chaulet	RPR
2002	Victorin Lurel	PS
2007	Victorin Lurel	PS
2012	Victorin Lurel	PS
2017	Hélène Vainqueur-Christophe	PS
2022	Élie Califer	PS

== Election results ==
=== 2024 ===
Candidate	Party or alliance		First round		Second round	
Candidate	Party or alliance		Votes	%	Votes	%
Elie Califer	New Popular Front	Socialist Party	12,617	57.89	15,068	71.09
Jennifer Linon	Regionalists	Miscellaneous centre	4,763	21.85	6,127	28.91
Lydie Marie Monthouël	National Rally		2,572	11.80		
Jean-Marie Nomertin	Far-left	Lutte Ouvrière	1,396	6.41		
Claudia Boucher	Independent	The Republicans	225	1.03		
Paola Plantier	Reconquête		221	1.01		
Total			21,794	100.00	21,195	100.00
Valid votes			21,794	93.78	21,195	92.51
Invalid votes			863	3.71	1,000	4.36
Blank votes			582	2.50	716	3.13
Total votes			23,239	100.00	22,911	100.00
Registered voters/turnout			68,730	33.81	68,702	33.35

=== 2022 ===
Legislative Election 2022: Guadeloupe's 4th constituency
Party	Candidate	Votes	%	±%
PS	Élie Califer	6,126	38.61	−0.09
GUSR (Ensemble)	Marie-Luce Penchard*	3,154	19.88	+12.04
LFI	Yanetti Paisley	2,389	15.06	+10.33
DIV	Jean-Yves Ramassamy	1,324	8.35	N/A
EXD	Martin Germain Paran	935	5.89	N/A
DVG	Marguerite Civis	625	3.94	N/A
Others	N/A	1,312	8.28	−
Turnout		15,865	24.96	+3.01
2nd round result
PS	Élie Califer	10,633	100.00	+38.39
Turnout		10,633	18.31	−16.26
PS hold				

* Withdrew after the first round.

=== 2017 ===
Candidate	Label	First round		Second round	
Candidate	Label	Votes	%	Votes	%
Hélène Vainqueur-Christophe	PS	6,912	38.70	13,403	61.61
Aramis Arbau	DVD	3,329	18.64	8,350	38.39
Eddy Claude-Maurice	DVD	1,430	8.01		
Sylvie Gustave	LREM	1,400	7.84		
Sonia Petro	LR	1,002	5.61		
Hugues Ramdini	PS	903	5.06		
Guilhem Saltel	LFI	845	4.73		
Jean-Marie Nomertin	CO	438	2.45		
Evita Chevry	DVD	424	2.37		
Yoann Tarquin	DIV	280	1.57		
Camille Edouard	PCF	249	1.39		
Béatrice Caze	FN	246	1.38		
Dominique Virassamy	DVD	124	0.69		
Alain Avril	LFQO	92	0.52		
Christine Houblon	UDI	84	0.47		
Claudia Boucher	DVD	62	0.35		
Martine Romera	UPR	41	0.23		
Valerie Nwetpoungam	REG	0	0.00		
Votes		17,861	100.00	21,753	100.00
Valid votes		17,861	92.13	21,753	90.89
Blank votes		661	3.41	851	3.56
Null votes		864	4.46	1,329	5.55
Turnout		19,386	27.97	23,933	34.57
Abstentions		49,921	72.03	45,300	65.43
Registered voters		69,307		69,233	
Source: Ministry of the Interior

=== 2012 ===
2012 legislative election in Guadeloupe's 4th constituency
Candidate	Party	First round	
Candidate	Party	Votes	%
Victorin Lurel	PS	18,178	67.23%
Marie-Luce Penchard	UMP	6,188	22.89%
Louis Molinie	UMP	1,330	4.92%
Jean-Marie Nomertin	CO	422	1.56%
Marc Guille	FN	310	1.15%
Guilhem Saltel	PG	294	1.09%
Fred Cassin	DVD	185	0.68%
Christine Houblon	PRV	131	0.48%
Valid votes		27,038	95.13%
Spoilt and null votes		1,383	4.87%
Votes cast / turnout		28,421	42.46%
Abstentions		38,522	57.54%
Registered voters		66,943	100.00%

== See also ==
- Arrondissements of Guadeloupe
- Cantons of Guadeloupe
- Constituency (France)
- Deputy (France)
