= Jeanny Marc =

Jeanny Marc-Mathiasin (born 2 December 1950 in Deshaies, Guadeloupe) was a member of the National Assembly of France.

She represented Guadeloupe's 3rd constituency on the Caribbean island of Guadeloupe from 2007 to 2012, and was a member of United Guadeloupe, Solidary and Responsible and sat as part of the Socialiste, radical, citoyen et divers gauche group.

== Biography ==
Her political career began in her hometown of Deshaies, where she served successively as a city council member, deputy mayor, and then mayor—a position she won in June 1995 and still holds today. At the departmental level, she was elected to the General Council for the Sainte-Rose-2 canton in 2001 and served until 2007. During this period, she also served as vice-president of the General Council.

A retired teacher, she ran for the National Assembly in Guadeloupe 3rd constituency and was elected on June 16, 2007, to serve in the 13th legislature. In the National Assembly, she is affiliated with the SRC group. As a United Guadeloupe, Solidary and Responsible representative, she is affiliated with the Radical Left Party.

During the 2011 Socialist primary, she threw her support behind Jean-Michel Baylet.

Although she ran for reelection in 2012, she was defeated in the first round, receiving 24.52% of the vote, compared to 24.67% for Max Mathiasin and 40.81% for Ary Chalus.

From 2015 to 2021, she served as a departmental councilor for Guadeloupe, elected from the Canton of Sainte-Rose-1 district.

== Bibliography ==
- page on the French National Assembly website
