= Philippe Chaulet =

French politician (1942–2026)

Member of the National Assembly for Guadeloupe's 4th constituency
- In office 2 May 1993 – 18 June 2002
- Preceded by: Lucette Michaux-Chevry
- Succeeded by: Victorin Lurel

Mayor of Bouillante
- In office 9 December 1984 – January 2005
- Preceded by: Isidore Canope
- Succeeded by: Robert Racon

General Councillor of Guadeloupe for the Canton of Bouillante
- In office 2001–2008
- Preceded by: Jean-Claude Malo
- Succeeded by: Marylhène Félicité
- In office 1982–1994
- Preceded by: Raymond Guilliod
- Succeeded by: Jean-Claude Malo

Personal details
- Born: 28 July 1942 Basse-Terre, Guadeloupe
- Died: 20 July 2026 (aged 83) Guadeloupe
- Party: RPR, UMP
- Education: University of the French Antilles
- Occupation: Company Manager

Philippe Chaulet (28 July 1942 – 20 July 2026) was a French politician who served as a Member of the National Assembly representing Guadeloupe's 4th constituency from 1993 to 2002. He also served as the Mayor of Bouillante from 1984 to 2005 and represented the Canton of Bouillante in the General Council of Guadeloupe across two separate tenures.

== Early life ==
Philippe Chaulet was born in Basse-Terre on 28 July 1942. He was a descendant of a family with roots in Charente-Maritime that settled in Guadeloupe in the late 18th century. His family's career is producing Arabica coffee and bananas.

Chaulet completed his primary and secondary schooling in Guadeloupe before changing to the business administration and economics at the University of the French Antilles.

== Career ==
Chaulet started his career as an agricultural entrepreneur and business manager and a political career in Guadeloupean politics. In 1984, he was elected Mayor of Bouillante, he held for over two decades until 2005. During his municipal tenure, he concurrently represented the Canton of Bouillante in the General Council of Guadeloupe from 1982 to 1994 and 2001 to 2009.

He entered the French Parliament in May 1993, representing Guadeloupe's 4th constituency in the National Assembly as a member of the centre-right Rally for the Republic (RPR) and later the Union for a Popular Movement (UMP). He got re-elected in 1997 and ended in 18 June 2002.

== Controversy ==
In 2006, Chaulet was given a one-year suspended prison sentence in the Guadeloupe tourist office case concerning embezzlement. A new system called Chaulet system was mentioned, for which the prosecutor had very harsh words for both its instigators and its beneficiaries.

== Personal life ==
Chaulet died on 20 July 2026, at the age of 83.
