= Beaugendre =

Beaugendre is a French surname. Notable people with the surname include:

- François Beaugendre (1880–1936), French cyclist
- Joël Beaugendre (born 1950), Guadeloupean politician
- Madely Beaugendre (born 1965), French high jumper
- Omer Beaugendre (1883–1954), French cyclist
