= Capesterre-Belle-Eau 2nd Canton =

Coordinates: 16.0510°N 61.5657°W

Capesterre-Belle-Eau-2
- Former canton
- Interactive map of Capesterre-Belle-Eau-2
- Country: France
- Overseas region and department: Guadeloupe{{{region}}}
- No. of communes: {{{nbcomm}}}
- Disbanded: 2015
- Population (2012): 12,703

Capesterre-Belle-Eau 2nd Canton is a former canton in the Arrondissement of Basse-Terre in the island group of Guadeloupe. It had 12,703 inhabitants (2012). It was disbanded following the French canton reorganisation which came into effect in March 2015. It comprised part of the commune of Capesterre-Belle-Eau, which joined the new canton of Capesterre-Belle-Eau in 2015.

== See also ==
- Cantons of Guadeloupe
- Communes of Guadeloupe
- Arrondissements of Guadeloupe
