= Olivier Serva =

French politician

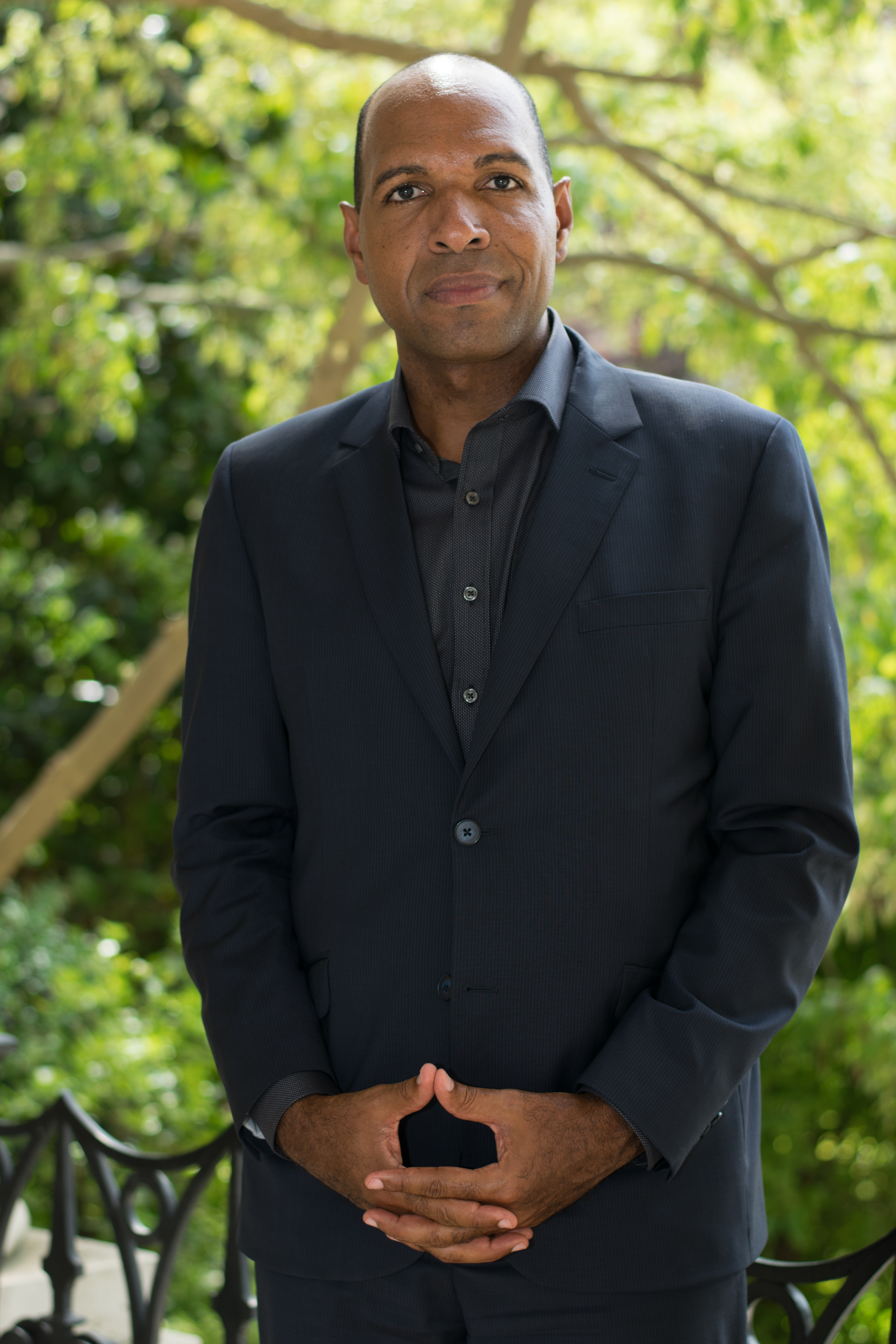
- Serva in 2017

Member of the National Assembly for Guadeloupe's 1st constituency
- Incumbent
- Assumed office 21 June 2017
- Preceded by: Éric Jalton

Member of the Regional Council of Guadeloupe
- In office 13 December 2015 – 27 June 2021

Personal details
- Born: 21 June 1974 (age 51) Pointe-à-Pitre, Guadeloupe
- Party: Eko Zabym
- Other political affiliations: United Guadeloupe, Solidary and Responsible (formerly); La République En Marche! (formerly)
- Profession: Chartered accountant

Olivier Serva (born 21 June 1974) is a French politician who has represented the 1st constituency of Guadeloupe in the National Assembly since 18 June 2017.

Elected in 2017 under the La République En Marche! (LREM) banner, Serva left the La République En Marche group in Parliament in 2022 to successfully run for reelection as a member of the local Eko Zabym party. He currently sits with the Liberties and Territories group.

== Political career ==
A native of Pointe-à-Pitre, Serva led the Eko Zabym list in the 2014 municipal election in Les Abymes. In the 2015 regional election in Guadeloupe, he joined the United Guadeloupe, Solidary and Responsible list led by Ary Chalus. Following Chalus's election to the presidency of the Regional Council of Guadeloupe, Serva became his third vice president, tasked with economic development.

In the 2017 legislative election, Serva was elected to the National Assembly in the 1st constituency of Guadeloupe. Following his election to Parliament, he resigned from the municipal council of Les Abymes.

In Parliament, Serva serves on the Committee on Finance. In 2020, Serva was the sole member of the La République En Marche group who abstained from the inaugural vote of confidence in the government of Prime Minister Jean Castex.

Ahead of the 2022 legislative election, Serva left the LREM group to simply run as a member of the local Eko Zabym party. He was categorised as a miscellaneous left (DVG) candidate by the Ministry of the Interior and supported by La France Insoumise (FI) in the second round, which he won with just over 74% of the vote.

In the 16th National Assembly under the Fifth Republic, he sits with the newly-formed Liberties and Territories group.

== Political positions ==
Serva has apologised for saying in 2012 that homosexuality was an "abomination".

In 2020, Serva was one of ten LREM group members who voted against the parliamentary group's majority to oppose a much discussed security bill drafted by fellow group members Alice Thourot and Jean-Michel Fauvergue that aimed at, among other measures, curtailing the filming of police forces and the subsequent publishing thereof. The proposed measure was struck by the Constitutional Council down before it could go into application.
