= Basse-Terre 2nd Canton =

Coordinates: 16.0010°N 61.7323°W

Basse-Terre-2
- Former canton
- Interactive map of Basse-Terre-2
- Country: France
- Overseas region and department: Guadeloupe{{{region}}}
- No. of communes: {{{nbcomm}}}
- Disbanded: 2015
- Population (2012): 4,612

Basse-Terre 2nd Canton is a former canton in the Arrondissement of Basse-Terre on the island of Guadeloupe. It had 4,612 inhabitants (2012). It was disbanded following the French canton reorganisation which came into effect in March 2015. It comprised part of the commune of Basse-Terre, which joined the new canton of Basse-Terre in 2015.

== See also ==
- Cantons of Guadeloupe
- Communes of Guadeloupe
- Arrondissements of Guadeloupe
