= Canton of Saint-Claude, Guadeloupe =

Coordinates: 16°02′04″N 61°41′56″W

Saint-Claude
- Former canton
- Interactive map of Saint-Claude
- Country: France
- Overseas region and department: Guadeloupe{{{region}}}
- No. of communes: {{{nbcomm}}}
- Disbanded: 2015
- Area: 34 km^{2} (13 sq mi)
- Population (2012): 10,439
  - Density: 310/km^{2} (800/sq mi)

The Canton of Saint-Claude is a former canton in the Arrondissement of Basse-Terre on the island of Guadeloupe. It was disbanded following the French canton reorganisation which came into effect in March 2015. It had 10,439 inhabitants (2012). It comprised the commune of Saint-Claude, which joined the new canton of Basse-Terre in 2015.

== See also ==
- Cantons of Guadeloupe
- Communes of Guadeloupe
- Arrondissements of Guadeloupe
