= Canton of Saint-Claude =

The Canton of Saint-Claude may refer to:

- Canton of Saint-Claude, Jura, a French canton in the department of Jura
- Canton of Saint-Claude, Guadeloupe, a French former canton in the department of Guadeloupe
