= Communauté d'agglomération du Nord Basse-Terre =

Nord Basse-Terre
- Communauté d'agglomération
- Location of Nord Basse-Terre within the department
- Coordinates: 16°18′N 61°42′W
- Country: France
- Overseas region and department: Guadeloupe{{{region}}}
- No. of communes: {{{nbcomm}}}
- Established: 2010
- Area: 464.8 km^{2} (179.5 sq mi)
- Population (2019): 76,742
  - Density: 165.1/km^{2} (427.6/sq mi)

Communauté d'agglomération du Nord Basse-Terre is a communauté d'agglomération, an intercommunal structure in the Guadeloupe overseas department and region of France. Created in 2010, its seat is in Sainte-Rose. Its area is 464.8 km^{2}. Its population was 76,742 in 2019.

== Composition ==
The communauté d'agglomération consists of the following 6 communes:

1. Deshaies
2. Goyave
3. Lamentin
4. Petit-Bourg
5. Pointe-Noire
6. Sainte-Rose
