= Raymond Guilliod =

Guadeloupean politician (1919–2005)

Raymond Guilliod (born 10 November 1919 in Saint-Claude, Guadeloupe; died 1 November 2005) was a politician from Guadeloupe who served in the French National Assembly from 1973 to 1981.

== Bibliography ==
- page on the French National Assembly website
