= Édouard Chammougon =

Édouard Chammougon (born 10 January 1937 in Baie Mahault, Guadeloupe) is a politician from Guadeloupe who served in the French National Assembly from 1993 to 1994 and from 1986 to 1988 for the Union for a Popular Movement.

== Biography ==
He became a member of parliament when Lucette Michaux-Chevry joined the Chirac II government as Secretary of State for the French-speaking world, reporting to the Prime Minister.

In the 1988 French presidential election, he refused to vote for Jacques Chirac in the second round. Charles Pasqua had previously spoken of his shared “values” with the National Rally during the election campaign.It was during his tenure as mayor (and under Prefect Guy Maillard) that the Maurice Satineau secondary school was built in Baie-Mahault, and inaugurated in 1979 in memory of a controversial political figure from the Third and Fourth Republics, who was born in the commune.

Édouard Chammougon was elected deputy for Guadeloupe's 3rd constituency in the 1993 French legislative election.On April 29 1993, along with twenty-three other Independent politician members of parliament, he took part in the creation of a parliamentary group called République et liberté. On March 30, 1994, the bureau of the National Assembly decided to lift his Parliamentary immunity in France.

After being stripped of his elective mandates, his wife Marcelle Chammougon was elected mayor of Baie-Mahault in December 1994, then general councillor for the canton in January 1995.
