= Arrondissement of Basse-Terre =

Coordinates: 16°0′N 61°44′W

Basse-Terre
- Arrondissement
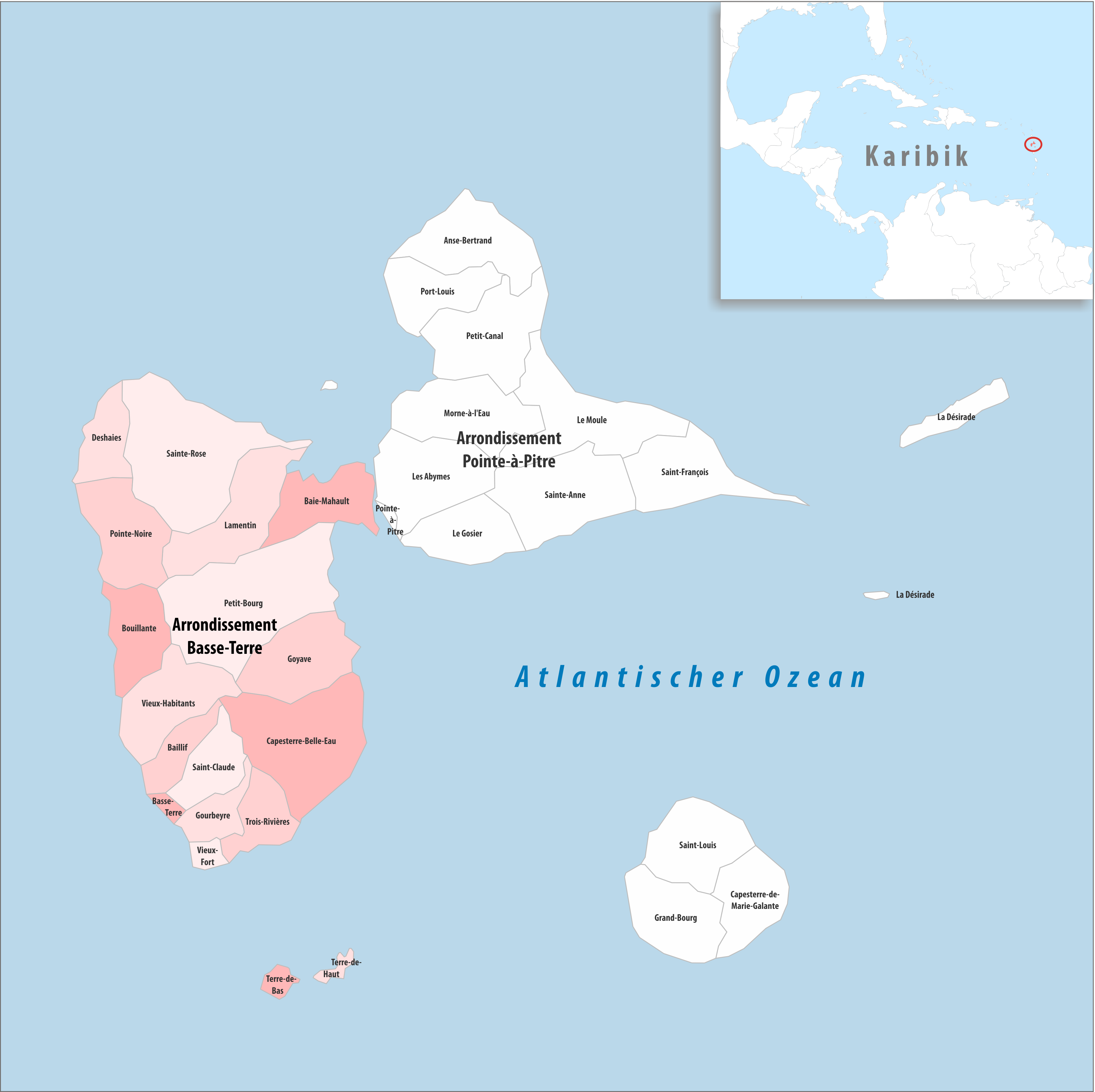
- Location within the region Guadeloupe
- Country: France
- Overseas region and department: Guadeloupe{{{region}}}
- No. of communes: {{{nbcomm}}}
- Area: 854.3 km^{2} (329.8 sq mi)
- Population (2023): 183,264
  - Density: 214.5/km^{2} (555.6/sq mi)
- INSEE code: 9711

The arrondissement of Basse-Terre is an arrondissement of France in the Guadeloupe department in the Guadeloupe region. It has 18 communes. Its population is 185,012 (2021), and its area is 854.3 km^{2} (329.8 sq mi).

== Composition ==
The communes of the arrondissement of Basse-Terre, and their INSEE codes, are:

1. Baie-Mahault (97103)
2. Baillif (97104)
3. Basse-Terre (97105)
4. Bouillante (97106)
5. Capesterre-Belle-Eau (97107)
6. Deshaies (97111)
7. Gourbeyre (97109)
8. Goyave (97114)
9. Lamentin (97115)
10. Petit-Bourg (97118)
11. Pointe-Noire (97121)
12. Saint-Claude (97124)
13. Sainte-Rose (97129)
14. Terre-de-Bas (97130)
15. Terre-de-Haut (97131)
16. Trois-Rivières (97132)
17. Vieux-Fort (97133)
18. Vieux-Habitants (97134)

== History ==
The arrondissement of Basse-Terre was established in 1947. The arrondissement of Saint-Martin-Saint-Barthélemy, containing the communes of Saint-Martin and Saint-Barthélemy, was created in 1963 from part of the arrondissement of Basse-Terre.

As a result of the reorganisation of the cantons of France which came into effect in 2015, the borders of the cantons are no longer related to the borders of the arrondissements. The cantons of the arrondissement of Basse-Terre were, as of January 2015:

1. Baie-Mahault
2. Basse-Terre-1
3. Basse-Terre-2
4. Bouillante
5. Capesterre-Belle-Eau-1
6. Capesterre-Belle-Eau-2
7. Gourbeyre
8. Goyave
9. Lamentin
10. Petit-Bourg
11. Pointe-Noire
12. Saint-Claude
13. Sainte-Rose-1
14. Sainte-Rose-2
15. Les Saintes
16. Trois-Rivières
17. Vieux-Habitants
