= Amédée Fengarol =

Guadeloupean politician

Amédée Fengarol (born 30 March 1905 in Capesterre-Belle-Eau, Guadeloupe; died 11 January 1951 in Pointe-à-Pitre, Guadeloupe) was a Guadeloupean politician. He died in the street on the day of his election as communist mayor of Pointe-à-Pitre. The cause of death was contested, the communist party and the newspaper L'Étincelle continued for years to maintain he was assassinated, yet other witnesses confirm no trace of blood on his shirt and that he may have died of natural causes. In either case the accusation of foul play continued to destabilise the socialist government of Paul Valentino who had succeeded in getting himself reelected as mayor.
