= Jardin botanique de Deshaies =

Botanical garden in Deshaies, Guadeloupe

Coordinates: 16.2997°N 61.7992°W

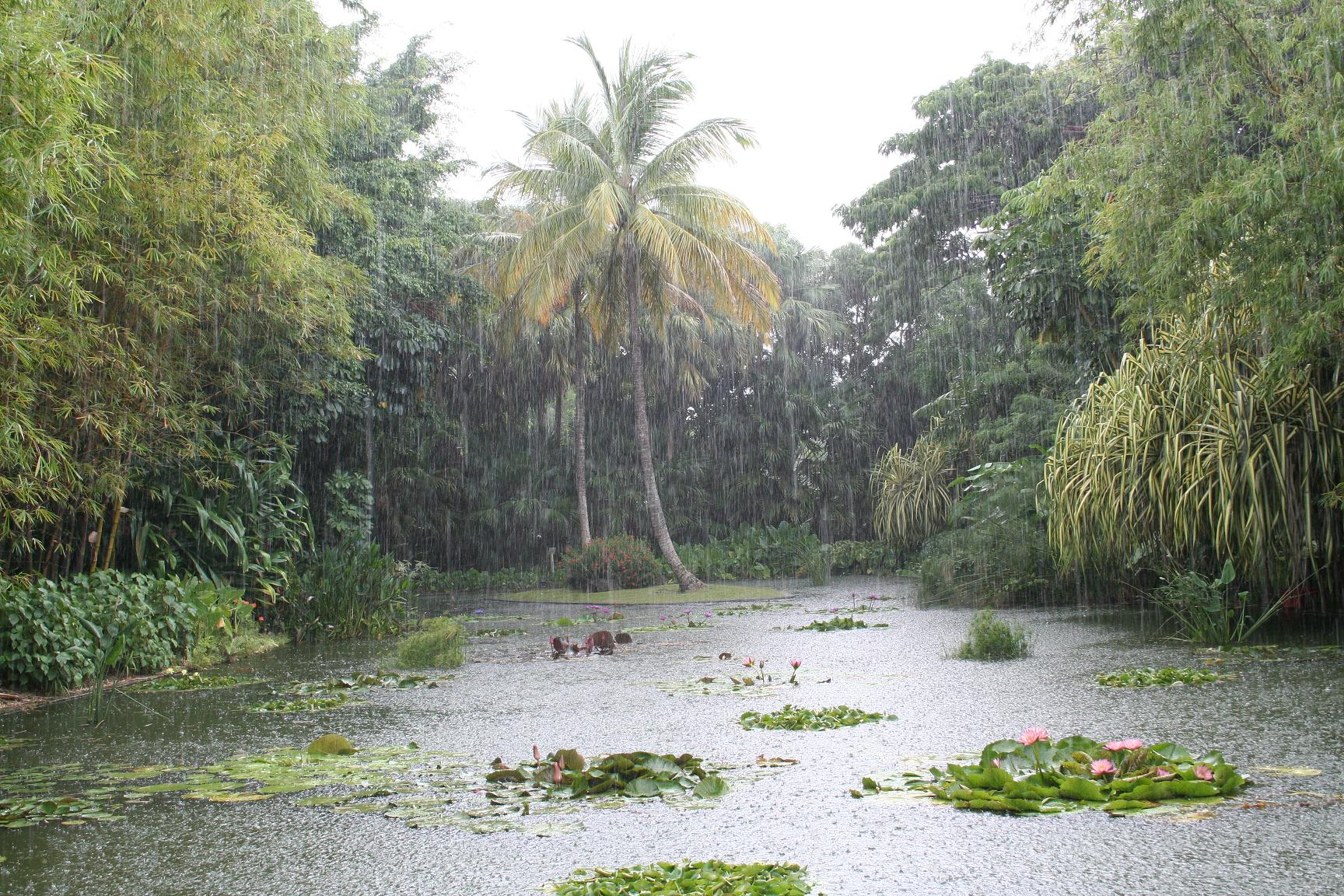
Jardin botanique de Deshaies

The Jardin botanique de Deshaies is a botanical garden located in Deshaies, Guadeloupe. It is open daily from 9h00 until 16h30. There is an admission fee of €15.90 for adults or €10.90 for children, with a group discount also available. Students €8.40. The site is 7 hectares and contains plant species from all over the world.

== History ==
From 1979-1986 the site was home to French comedian Coluche, having previously been populated with rare plants by Guy Blandin. After Coluche's death in 1986, nurseryman Michel Gaillard purchased the property in 1991 with the idea of creating a botanical garden. The garden opened in 2001, after 15 months of work by over 40 employees.

== Flora and fauna ==
Today the garden contains more than 1,000 species set along 1.5 kilometers of pathways through 15 different garden areas, including an arboretum of Araucaria, avocado, baobab, bombax, breadfruit tree, calliandra, jacaranda, and royal palms; an aviary with parakeets; bamboo; a banyan tree; cactus; ferns, bromeliads, and epiphytic plants; flamingos; parrots; hibiscus and bougainvillea; orchid collection; palm tree collection; pond with water lilies, papyrus, koi carp and aquatic plants; and a man-made waterfall (10 meters).

== Services ==
The gardens offer not only a snack bar, but also a restaurant with panoramic views over the park and the Caribbean Sea. Towards the exit of the park there is a children's play area, complete with a goat enclosure, and a gift shop. Wheelchairs, pushchairs and umbrellas are all offered, free of charge, at the reception desk. There is also the possibility to leaving pets at reception, as they are not allowed into the gardens.

== See also ==
- List of botanical gardens in France
