= Éric Jalton =

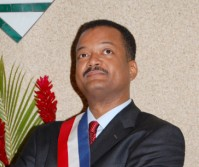
- Jalton in 2008

Mayor of Les Abymes
- Incumbent
- Assumed office 16 March 2008
- Preceded by: Daniel Marsin

Member of the National Assembly for Guadeloupe's 1st constituency
- In office 19 June 2002 – 20 June 2017
- Preceded by: Daniel Marsin
- Succeeded by: Olivier Serva

General councillor of Guadeloupe
- In office 22 March 1998 – 11 September 2009
- Preceded by: Rosan Fanhan
- Succeeded by: Chantal Lérus

Personal details
- Born: 16 September 1961 (age 64) Les Abymes, Guadeloupe

Éric Jalton (born 16 September 1961) is a French politician from Guadeloupe who is the current mayor of Les Abymes. He previously was a member of the National Assembly of France, from 2002 to 2017 where he represented the island of Guadeloupe, and was a member of the Socialiste, radical, citoyen et divers gauche.

== Bibliography ==
- page on the French National Assembly website
