= Canton of Bouillante =

Coordinates: 16°06′04″N 61°44′56″W

Bouillante
- Former canton
- Interactive map of Bouillante
- Country: France
- Overseas region and department: Guadeloupe{{{region}}}
- No. of communes: {{{nbcomm}}}
- Disbanded: 2015
- Area: 43.46 km^{2} (16.78 sq mi)
- Population (2012): 7,481
  - Density: 172.1/km^{2} (445.8/sq mi)

The Canton of Bouillante is a former canton in the Arrondissement of Basse-Terre on the island of Guadeloupe. It had 7,481 inhabitants (2012). It was disbanded following the French canton reorganisation which came into effect in March 2015. It comprised the commune of Bouillante, which joined the canton of Sainte-Rose-1 in 2015.

== See also ==
- Cantons of Guadeloupe
- Communes of Guadeloupe
- Arrondissements of Guadeloupe
