= Paul Valentino =

Guadeloupean politician

Paul Calixte Valentino (born 9 June 1902 in Pointe-à-Pitre, Guadeloupe; died 15 March 1988) was a politician from Guadeloupe who served in the French National Assembly from 1946 to 1955. He became socialist mayor of Pointe-à-Pitre in January 1951 after the unexplained death of the communist candidate Amédée Fengarol.

== Bibliography ==
- Page on the French National Assembly website
