= Sylviane Telchid =

Guadeloupean writer and translator (1941–2023)

- Born: 17 September 1941; Capesterre-Belle-Eau, Guadeloupe, France
- Died: 5 March 2023 (aged 81)
- Occupations: Writer, professor, pedagogue

Sylviane Telchid (17 September 1941 – 5 March 2023) was a Guadeloupean writer, translator and professor of French and Antillean Creole.

== Biography ==
Sylviane Telchid was born on 17 September 1941 in the Antilles, in the Capesterre-Belle-Eau commune on the French island of Guadeloupe. She became a teacher at a school in Capesterre-Belle-Eau, the Collège Germain Saint-Ruf.

In 1976, one of her colleagues there, the mathematics professor Hector Poullet, proposed teaching classes in Creole, despite the ban on using Creole in a school setting. Of the teachers he approached about joining his project, only Telchid and Danielle Montbrand answered the call. In 1983, Creole finally became part of the pedagogy at the Collège Germain Saint-Ruf.

Telchid went on to dedicate herself to the defense and rehabilitation of Guadeloupean culture and Guadeloupean Creole. In 1984 Telchid, Poullet and Montbrand published the first Guadeloupean Creole–French dictionary.

Telchid also translated several French texts into Creole, including translations of Molière and Jean de La Fontaine. She has also translated plays by the likes of Anton Chekhov and Bertolt Brecht. After her retirement, Telchid worked on a translation of the Bible into Creole.

In October 2014, the Bonne Espérance School in Capesterre-Belle-Eau was renamed Collège Sylviane Telchid in her honor. Four years later, a bust of Telchid sculpted by Jocelyn Pézeron was unveiled at the school.

Telchid died from complications of Alzheimer's disease on 5 March 2023, at the age of 81.

== Selected works ==
=== Novels ===
- Throvia de la Dominique (1996)

=== Essays ===
- "'Mi bèl pawòl !' ou Eléments d'une poétique de la langue créole" (with Hector Poullet in Écrire la "parole de nuit" : la nouvelle littérature antillaise, 1994)

=== Stories ===
- Ti-Chika—et d'autres contes antillais (1985)
- Légendes et mystères du pays-Guadeloupe (illustrations by Jocelyn Pézeron, 1999)

=== Dictionaries and Creole-language works ===
- Jé kréyòl (1983)
- Dictionnaire des expressions du créole guadeloupéen (co-authored with Hector Poullet and Danielle Montbrand, 1984)
- Dictionnaire du français régional des Antilles : Guadeloupe, Martinique (1997)
- Kréyòl fanm chatengn (Creole exercises for schoolchildren, 2003)
- Bon Doukou – ékriti, gramè, vokabilè, pwovèb : liv pou mèt é métrès lékol (2011)
