= Victorin Lurel =

French politician (born 1951)

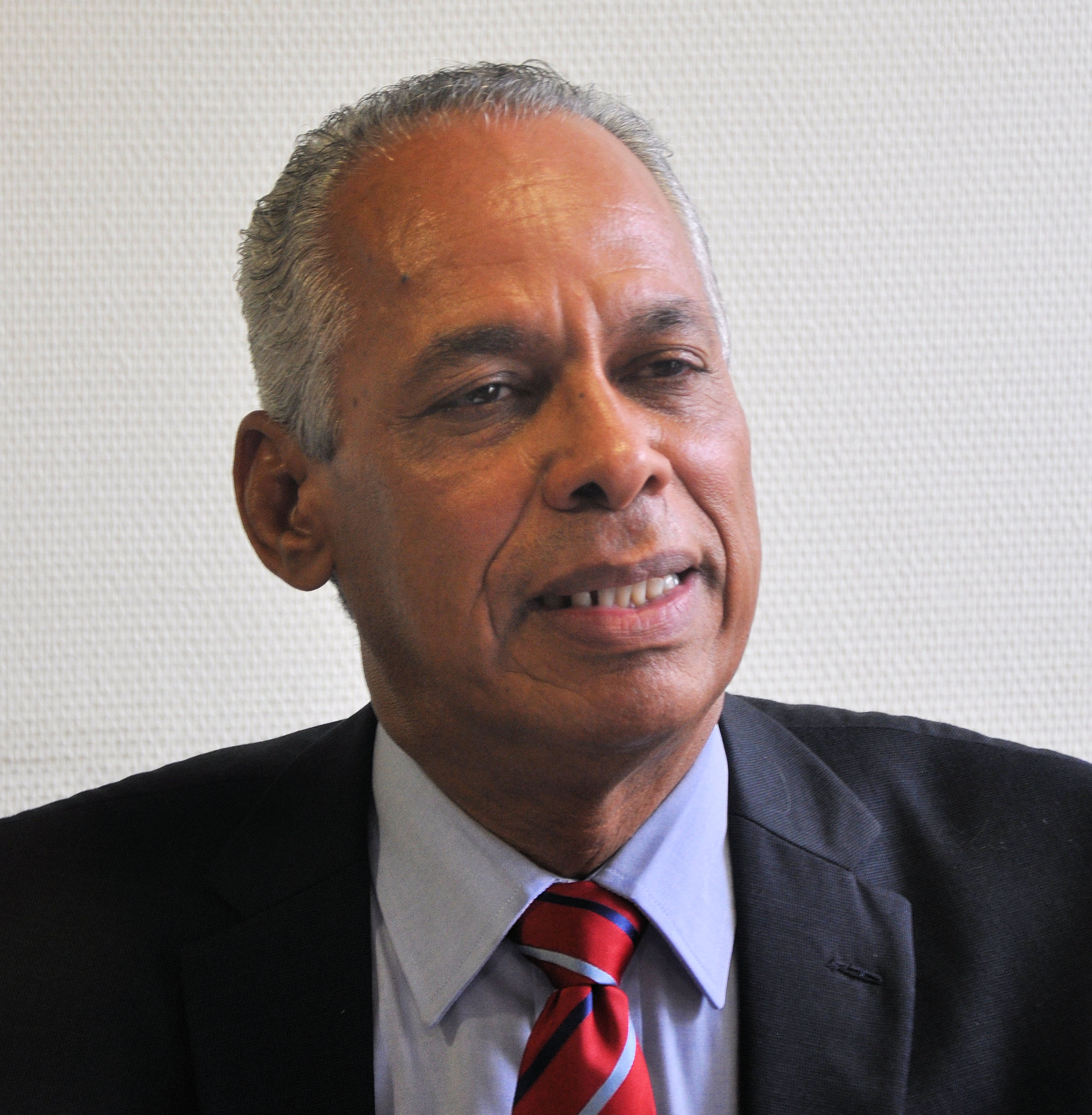

Minister of Overseas France
- In office 16 May 2012 – 2 April 2014
- Prime Minister: Jean-Marc Ayrault
- Preceded by: Marie-Luce Penchard
- Succeeded by: George Pau-Langevin

President of the Regional Council of Guadeloupe
- In office 15 August 2004 – 18 December 2015
- Preceded by: Philippe Chaulet
- Succeeded by: Ary Chalus

Personal details
- Born: 20 August 1951 (age 74) Vieux-Habitants, Basse Terre Island
- Party: Socialist Party

Victorin Lurel (French pronunciation: [vik.tɔ.ʁɛ̃ ly.ʁɛl] ; born 20 August 1951 in Vieux-Habitants, Guadeloupe) is a French politician who represented the 4th district of Guadeloupe in the French National Assembly from 2002 to 2012. He also served as the President of the Regional Council of the French overseas department of Guadeloupe from 2004 until 2015. His term began on 15 August 2004 and was renewed on 14 March 2010. In May 2012, he was made the Minister of Overseas France in Jean-Marc Ayrault's cabinet and was replaced in the national assembly by his supplementary candidate Hélène Vainqueur-Christophe. However, on 23 March 2014, he lost the local elections in Vieux-Habitants, and as of 2 April 2014, he was not reappointed to the Valls Cabinet. On 13 December 2015 he lost the regional elections in Guadeloupe.
