= Hélène Vainqueur-Christophe =

French politician

Deputy for Guadeloupe's 4th constituency in the National Assembly of France
- In office 2012–2022
- Preceded by: Victorin Lurel
- Succeeded by: Élie Califer

Personal details
- Born: 6 May 1956 (age 69) Trois-Rivières, Guadeloupe, France
- Party: Socialist Party

Hélène Vainqueur-Christophe (born 6 May 1956 in Trois-Rivières, Guadeloupe) is a French politician of the Socialist Party who was elected to the French National Assembly on 10 June 2012 (as the supplementary candidate for Victorin Lurel) representing the 4th constituency of the department of Guadeloupe. She was re-elected in the 2017 election, but did not contest the 2022 legislative election, which was won by Élie Califer, also of the Socialist Party.
