= Frédéric Jalton =

Guadeloupean politician (1924–1995)

Frédéric Jalton (born 21 February 1924 in Les Abymes, Guadeloupe; died 19 November 1995) was a politician from Guadeloupe who served in the French National Assembly from 1973-1995.

== Biography ==
Born on February 21, 1924, in Les Abymes,Guadeloupe, Frédéric Jalton was the youngest of ten children; his parents were farmers of modest means. After earning his high school diploma, he attended the Faculty of Medicine at the University of Montpellier before setting up practice as a doctor in his hometown in 1952. In 1956, he was one of the founders of the Guadeloupean Federation of the Socialist Party (France).

In 1964, he was elected to the General Council, but the following year he was defeated in the municipal elections in Les Abymes. Those elections were annulled by the Conseil d'État, and he was elected in 1967. In 1973, he was elected to the National Assembly—but was defeated in 1978 by rumors that the Socialists supported autonomy. He then served as a Member of the European Parliament from 1980 to 1981, at which point he resigned to take his seat in the National Assembly, where he had just been reelected. He was the only Socialist deputy to vote against Article 1 of the bill abolishing the death penalty on September 18, 1981. He served as a deputy until his death, for a total of 28 years.

Weakened by prostate cancer diagnosed in 1986, he lost the municipal elections in 1995 before passing away in November of that same year. Patrice Tirolien replaced him in the National Assembly. Then, following Daniel Marsin election in 1997, his son Éric, already mayor of Les Abymes, was elected to the National Assembly in 2002 and took over his father’s seat. He had three children with his wife Mona, whom he married in 1958; one of them, also named Frédéric, is an architect.

== Bibliography ==
- Frédéric Jalton page on the French National Assembly website
