= Hôtel de Ville, Sainte-Rose, Guadeloupe =

Town hall in Sainte-Rose, Guadeloupe, France

Hôtel de Ville
- The main frontage of the Hôtel de Ville in October 2025

General information
- Type: City hall
- Architectural style: Neoclassical style
- Location: Sainte-Rose, Guadeloupe
- Coordinates: 16.3332°N 61.6983°W
- Completed: 1931

Design and construction
- Architect: Gérard-Michel Corbin

The Hôtel de Ville (French pronunciation: [otɛl də vil], City Hall) is a municipal building in Sainte-Rose, Guadeloupe in the Caribbean Sea, standing on Place de la Mairie.

== History ==
After Sainte-Rose became a separate municipality in 1837, the new town council led by the mayor, Bernard Daniel Poirié Saint-Véran, decided to commission a town hall. The site they selected was in the town centre close to the Church of Sainte-Rose de Lima. The first town hall was probably a simple two-storey structure, built in timber and completed in the mid-19th century. A fountain in the form of a statue of Marianne carrying a jar and surrounded by cherubs was cast by the Val d'Osne foundry and erected in front of the building in 1876.

On 12 September 1928, a severe hurricane devastated Guadeloupe, severely damaging buildings and leading to 1,200 deaths. In the aftermath of the hurricane, the council decided to commission a new town hall. Construction of the new building commenced on 14 January 1930. It was designed by Gérard-Michel Corbin in the neoclassical style, built in concrete and completed in 1931. The original design involved a symmetrical main frontage of just one storey facing onto the street. The central bay contained a large round-headed opening and the other bays contained smaller round-headed windows. All the bays were flanked by pilasters. An extra floor, with a veranda formed by a series of columns supporting prominent eaves, was added in 1949. Internally, the principal room was the Salle du Conseil (council chamber) which was also used to host wedding ceremonies. The painter, Antoine Gianelli, was commissioned to decorate the rooms.

On 19 February 2009, during the French Caribbean general strikes, the building was attacked and damaged by rioters. Two helicopters were deployed so that the gendarmes could get past the rioters' barricades and secure the town hall.
