= Élie Califer =

French politician (born 1954)

Deputy for Guadeloupe's 4th constituency in the National Assembly of France
- Incumbent
- Assumed office 19 June 2022
- Preceded by: Hélène Vainqueur-Christophe

Personal details
- Born: 19 April 1954 (age 71) Saint-Claude, Guadeloupe, France
- Party: Socialist Party
- Other political affiliations: NUPES

Élie Califer (born 19 April 1954) is a French politician who was elected to represent Guadeloupe's 4th constituency in the 2022 legislative election. A member of the Socialist Party, his candidacy was supported by the New Ecologic and Social People's Union (NUPES) coalition.

== Early life ==
Califer was born on 19 April 1954 in Saint-Claude, Guadeloupe.

== Political career ==
Califer served as mayor of Saint-Claude, Guadeloupe. In 2022, he ran to succeed Hélène Vainqueur-Christophe as member of Guadeloupe's 4th constituency in the National Assembly. Califer advanced to the second round of the contest, where he faced Marie-Luce Penchard of the Ensemble Citoyens coalition. However, Penchard dropped out during the second round, allowing Califer to automatically win the election.

In 2023, Califer publicly endorsed the re-election of the Socialist Party's chairman Olivier Faure.
