= Ary Chalus =

French politician from Guadeloupe (born 1961)

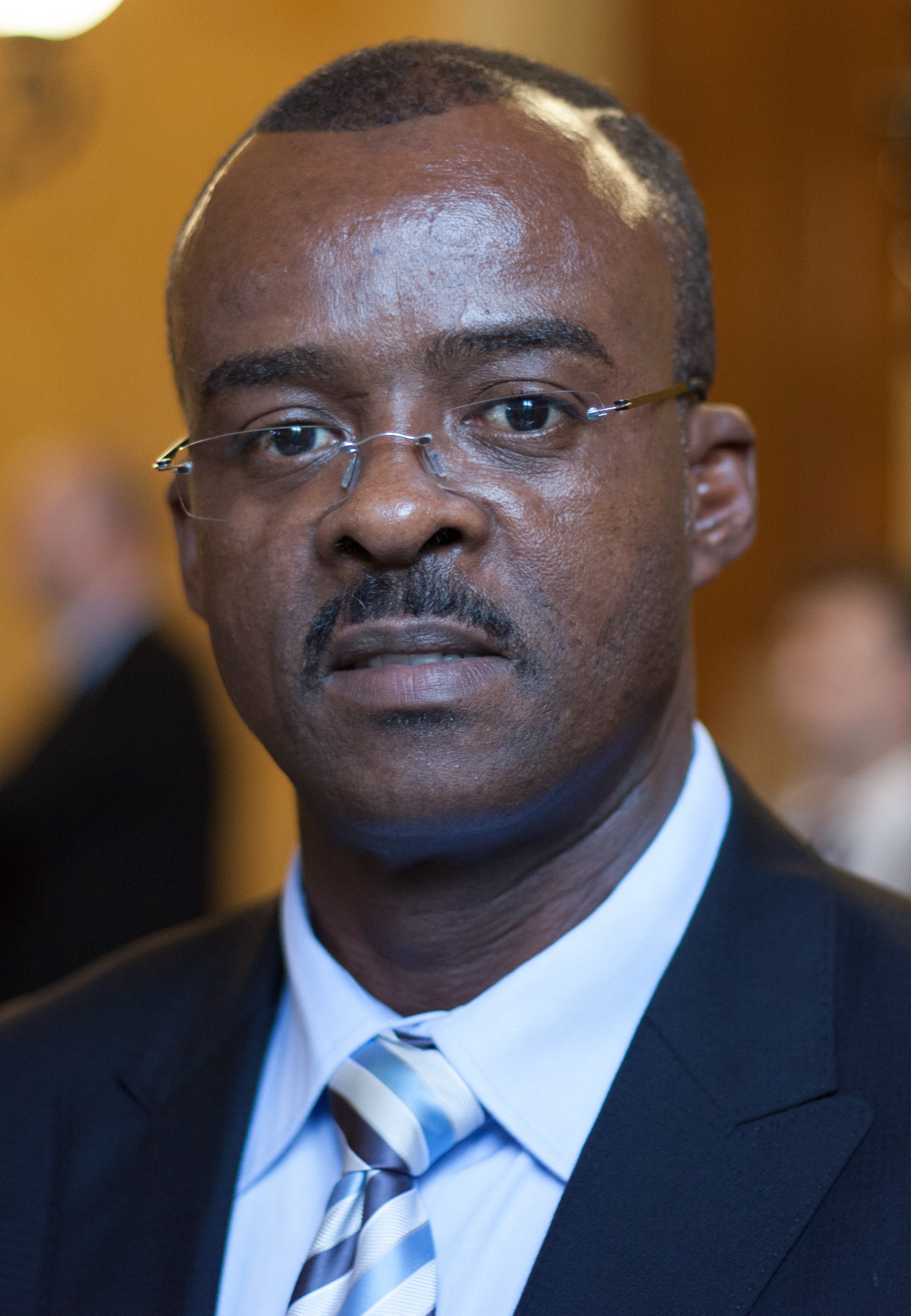
- Ary Chalus in 2012

President of the Regional Council of Guadeloupe
- Incumbent
- Assumed office 18 December 2015
- Preceded by: Victorin Lurel

Member of the National Assembly for Guadeloupe's 3rd constituency
- In office 20 June 2012 – 20 June 2017
- Preceded by: Jeanny Marc
- Succeeded by: Max Mathiasin

Member of the Regional Council of Guadeloupe for Baie-Mahault
- In office 28 March 2004 – 19 July 2012
- Preceded by: Marcelle Chammougon
- Succeeded by: Juliana Dan

Mayor of Baie-Mahault
- In office 19 April 2001 – 24 December 2015
- Preceded by: Paul Mado
- Succeeded by: Hélène Molia-Polifonte

Personal details
- Born: 6 December 1961 (age 64) Pointe-à-Pitre, Guadeloupe, France
- Party: Renaissance
- Other political affiliations: GUSR

Ary Chalus (born 6 December 1961) is a French politician from Guadeloupe who has been Guadeloupe president since 2015. He was the mayor of Baie-Mahault from April 2001 to December 2015. He was the deputy for Guadeloupe's 3rd constituency in the National Assembly of France from 2012 to 2017, as a member of the GUSR.

On 11 May 2021 Ary Chalus was placed in police custody as part of a preliminary investigation for breach of trust, complicity in the embezzlement of public funds and illegal financing of an electoral campaign.
