= Deshaies =

- Commune
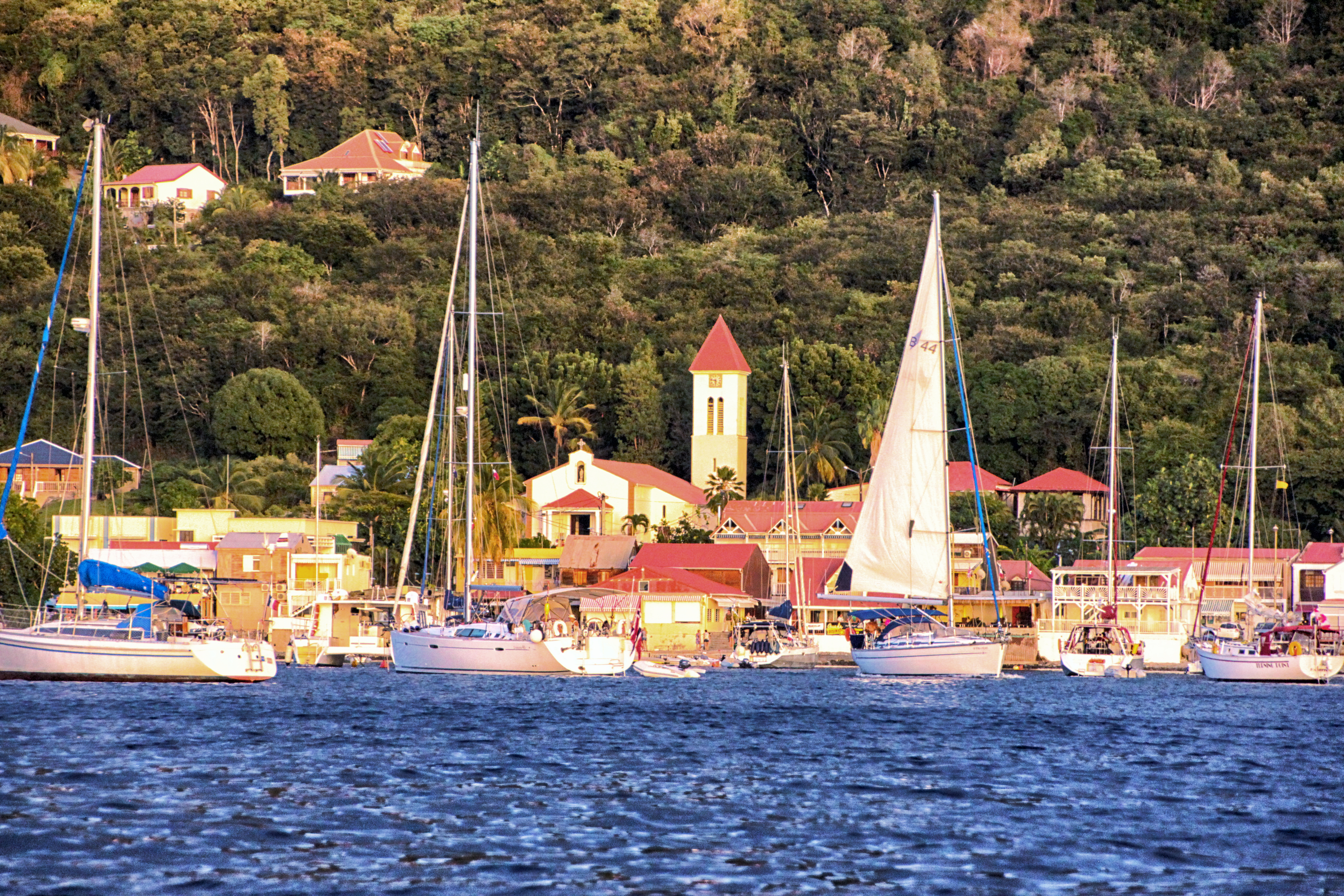
- The view from a boat ride departing from Deshaies

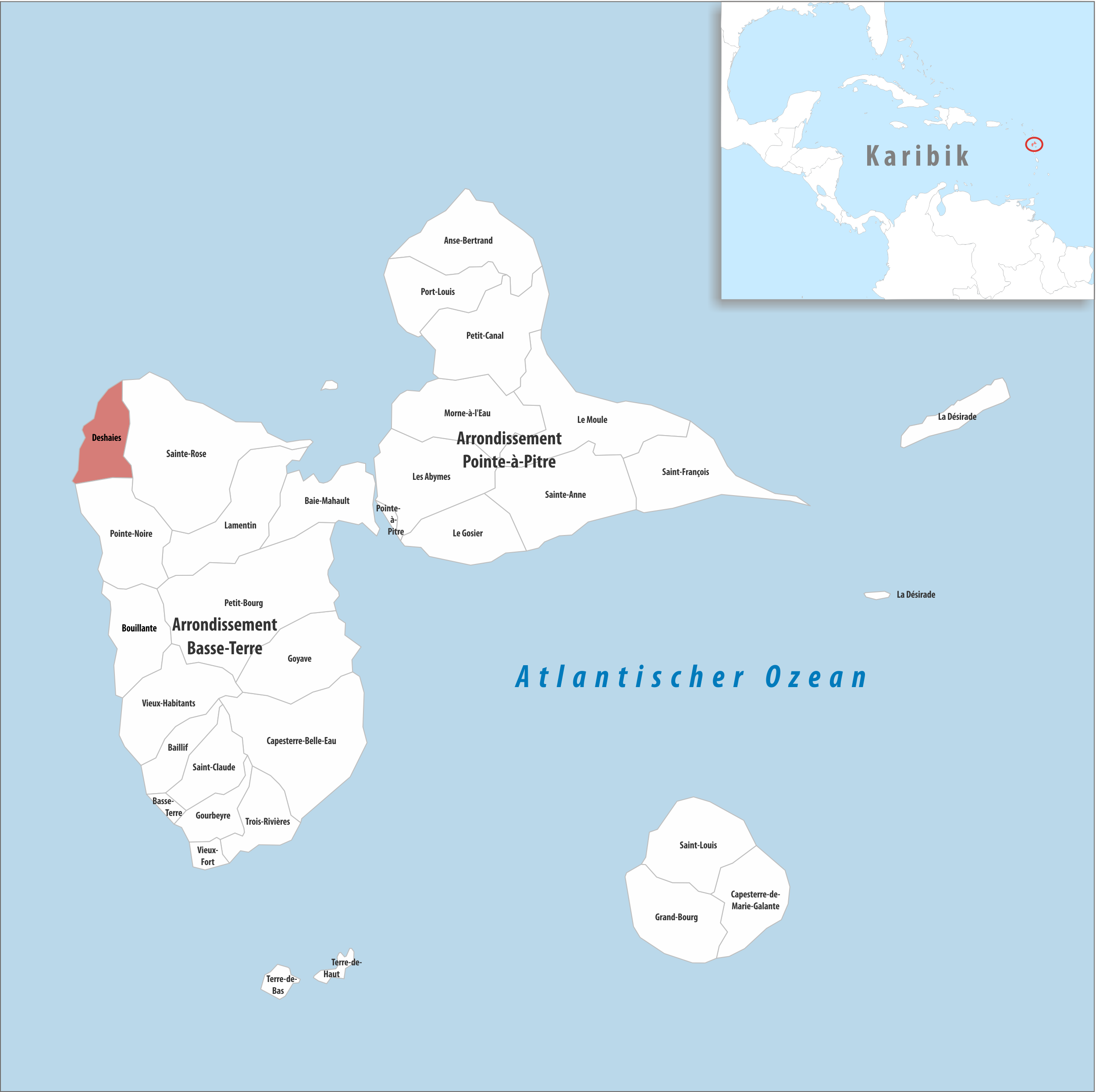
- Location of the commune (in red) within Guadeloupe
- Location of Deshaies
- Coordinates: 16°18′N 61°48′W
- Country: France
- Overseas region and department: Guadeloupe
- Arrondissement: Basse-Terre
- Canton: Sainte-Rose-1
- Intercommunality: CA Nord Basse-Terre

Government
  - Mayor (2020–2026): Jeanny Marc
- Area^{1}: 31.10 km^{2} (12.01 sq mi)
- Population (2023): 3,710
  - Density: 119/km^{2} (309/sq mi)
- Time zone: UTC−04:00 (AST)
- INSEE/Postal code: 97111 /97126
- ^{1} French Land Register data, which excludes lakes, ponds, glaciers > 1 km^{2} (0.386 sq mi or 247 acres) and river estuaries.

Deshaies (French pronunciation: [deɛ]; Guadeloupean Creole: Déhé) is a commune in the French overseas region and department of Guadeloupe, in the Lesser Antilles. It is on the northwest coast of Basse-Terre Island.

== History ==
Deshaies, and its littoral zone of the Large Cape, preserve the vestiges of the primitive vegetation of Guadeloupe at the time of Christopher Columbus's arrival on November 4, 1493. The deepest bay of all the Caribbean coast and best naturally protected, it was used as shelter to the adventurers of pirates and other corsairs, and there is said to be treasure on the island.

In 1635, colonists landed at Allègre point, at the north end of the island. This part of the coast is very damp; Deshaies is an integral part of a wooded territory extending from Pointe Noire to Baie-Mahault.

On the site of the current borough was the plantation of Potherie, one of the greatest fortunes of the island in 1686. Ten years later, in 1696, the sugar plantations fell victim to the English corsairs.

The geographical configuration makes traveling to the district difficult, so inhabitants formed their own community, including their own militia. The borough was given two cannons on April 1, 1730, and established as a community by the will of the governor in 1732. The church was consecrated on June 29, 1733, and dedicated to Saint Pierre and Saint Paul. Deshaies was disorganized economically by Victor Hugues' conquest and the abolition of slavery. The majority of her inhabitants had taken up arms for the revolution, but the island remained in the hands of the royalists.

The 19th-century Napoleonic era was not good for Deshaies because it was the zone in which a Caribbean empire developed. Its distance from the chief town (Basse-Terre) made Deshaies vulnerable despite its strategic position. After the naval battle in the bay between French and British on September 5, 1803, the borough and the coastal properties of the vicinity were devastated by the British. The war combined with malaria, which was endemic in the area, made people disinclined to live there.

Thirty years later, four years after the abolition of slavery, there remained only one sugar plantation, Guyonneau, belonging to the Caillou family.

The commune in 1852 saw periods of tensions. The opposition between Caillou and the black farmers of his plantation, who were supported by the priest of the parish, Lettre, became the working class struggle against the wealthy classes, and of the religious authority against the administrative authority.

The government of the colony, the Minister for the Navy and the Colonies, feared Deshaies would not support him and maintained correspondence with his superiors. Once law and order had been returned, the ministry ordered the deportation of the priest. The ministry created a police station squad maintained by the governor in 1877, despite the refusal of the Council General. Between the time slavery was abolished and the Second World War, lack of education remained the principal obstacle to the development of this community. Appointment to the civil or religious administration of Deshaies was regarded as a disgrace to the person so appointed. Deshaies remained insulated and marginalized. There has been a road connecting the chief towns of the leeward shore since 1922, but it ended in Pointe Noire, the commune bordering Deshaies. The road was extended to Deshaies only in 1957.

The current mayor is Jeanny Marc.

== Geography ==
Deshaies is located on the leeward northwest coast of Basse-Terre Island and is secluded in a bay, where two headlands stick out. Deshaies' coordinates are 16° 18 ' N & 61° 48 'W. The mountain range is east while the Caribbean Sea is west. It includes Kahouanne, an uninhabited islet of 1,500 metres from the coast. It is about 0.541 km^{2} (0.209 sq mi) in area and is a protected site.

=== Climate ===
Like any other Eastern Caribbean town, Deshaies experiences quite evenly spread rainfall during the year, with a wetter season between July and November which coincides with hurricane season. The town receives 1500–2500 mm (60–100 in) of rainfall. Tropical heat is the norm, bringing constant highs of around 32 °C (89 °F) that drop to 20 °C (68 °F) at night.

Trade winds, called alizés, blow from the northeast and often temper the climate.

== Population ==
The inhabitants are called Deshaisiens in French.

Historical population
Year	Pop.	±% p.a.
1967	3,305	—
1974	3,519	+0.90%
1982	3,485	−0.12%
1990	3,476	−0.03%
1999	4,039	+1.68%
2007	4,322	+0.85%
2012	4,271	−0.24%
2017	4,081	−0.91%
2023	3,710	−1.58%
Source: INSEE

== Economy ==
Mixed crops are grown such as vanilla, sugar, coffee, cocoa and bananas. Fishing is an important industry where different types of fish can be bought at the mini-market.

Tourism is booming and hotels and restaurants are located nearby. There is a craft industry where wooden souvenirs can be purchased in shops. Aggregate extraction is done.

Since 2011, Deshaies, and many of its businesses, have become the main filming location of the TV series Death in Paradise

== Education ==
Public primary schools include:

- Ecole primaire Beaujour Agénor
- Ecole primaire Audelon Bethsy
- Ecole primaire Ferry
- Ecole primaire Riflet

Public junior high schools include:

- Collège Félix Aladin Flemin

== Tourism and sights ==
Deshaies was the first village of Club Med intended for exclusively American customers (currently the Langley Resort Hotel Fort Royal Guadeloupe). This resort is the only hotel on the island of Basse Terre which is directly located on the beach.

The late French comedian Coluche's house, which dominated bay of Deshaies, has been transformed into botanical park. Robert Charlebois (Québécois singer) had his house towards Grand-Anse beach, the largest beach of Guadeloupe.

The music video for "Parti pour zouker" by the French artist Lorie was shot on a beach of Deshaies. French singer Barone shot a video on the beach at Hotel Fort Royal in 2014.

Deshaies has become well known because, as the fictional town of Honoré, it is the setting of the British-French crime comedy drama television series Death in Paradise. For example, La Perle beach is the location of the inspector's home, the Presbytery attached to the church of St Peter and St Paul in Deshaies is the police station and a restaurant called "la madras" is Catherine's bar.

=== Tourist destinations ===
- The beaches of Grande Anse, Rifflet, La Perle, Bas Vent and Ferry are located nearby.
- The Orchises garden.
- Pointe Batterie.
- Sail & Surf Club at Langley Resort Hotel Fort Royal Guadeloupe which also includes a diving center.
- Sunset cruise at Deshaies village
- The Jardin botanique de Deshaies (Botanical garden of Deshaies).
- The beaches of Plage de Cluny, Plage de l'Hotel Fort Royal (Bas Vent), Plage de la Perle, Plage de Grande Anse, Plage de Ferry

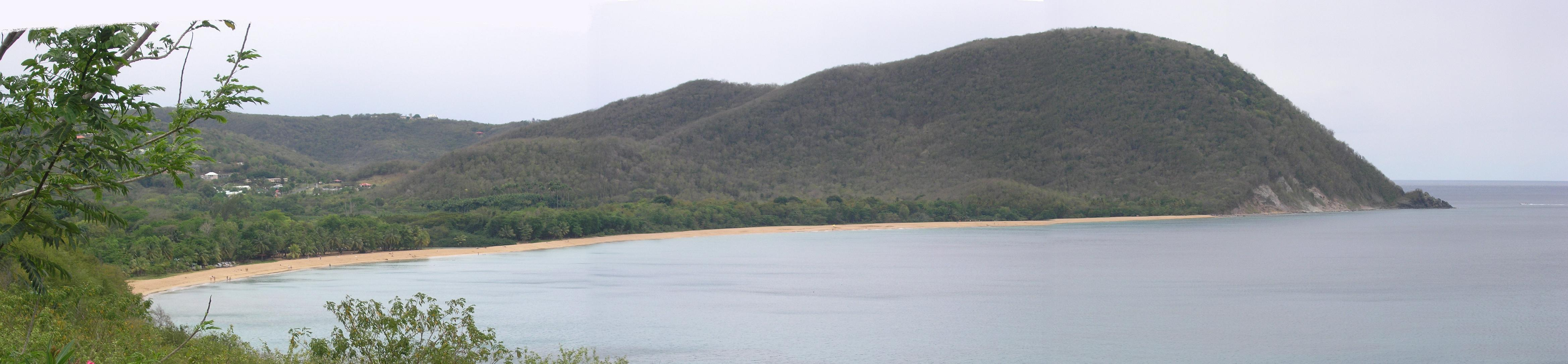
View of Grand Anse beach

== Notable residents ==
- Robert Charlebois
- Olivier Dacourt
- Jeanny Marc
- Coluche
- Laurent Bonnet

== See also ==
- Communes of the Guadeloupe department
