= Dominique Larifla =

Guadeloupean politician (born 1936)

Dominique Larifla (born 6 July 1936 in Petit-Bourg) is a politician from Guadeloupe who served in the French Senate from 1995 to 2004 and the French National Assembly from 1988 to 1993.
