= Rody Tolassy =

French politician

Rody Tolassy MEP

Member of the European Parliament for France
- Incumbent
- Assumed office 16 July 2024

Personal details
- Born: 21 September 1987 (age 38) Sainte-Rose, Guadeloupe, France
- Party: National Rally

Rody Tolassy (born 21 September 1987) is a French politician from Guadeloupe which represents the National Rally party. He is a member of the European Parliament, having taken office on 16 July 2024.
