= Pointe-Noire, Guadeloupe =

Pointe-Noire
- Commune
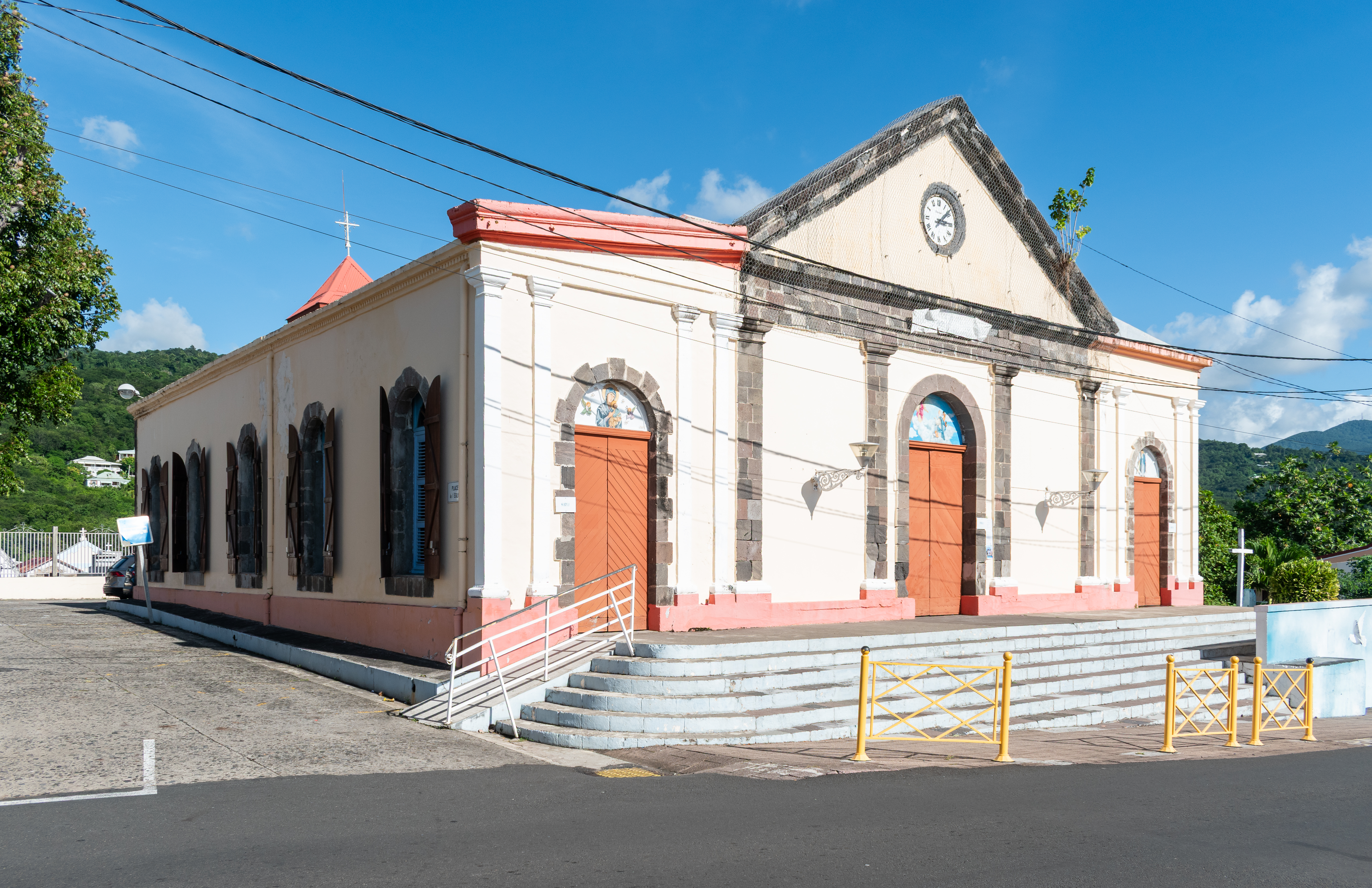
- The church of Our Lady of the Assumption, Pointe-Noire

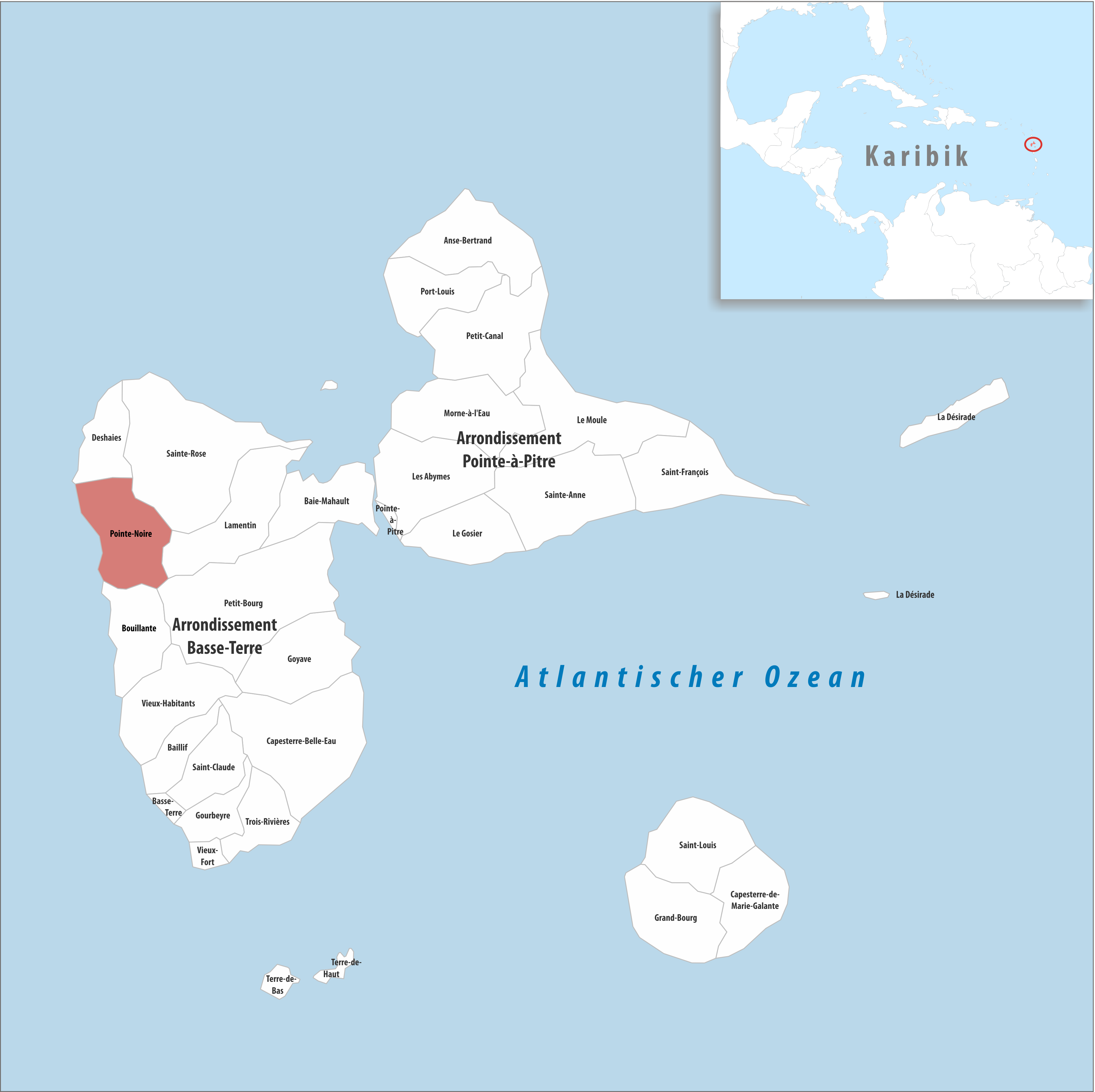
- Location of the commune (in red) within Guadeloupe
- Location of Pointe-Noire
- Coordinates: 16°13′00″N 61°46′00″W
- Country: France
- Overseas region and department: Guadeloupe
- Arrondissement: Basse-Terre
- Canton: Sainte-Rose-1
- Intercommunality: CA Nord Basse-Terre

Government
  - Mayor (2020–2026): Camille Elisabeth
- Area^{1}: 59.70 km^{2} (23.05 sq mi)
- Highest elevation: 775 m (2,543 ft)
- Lowest elevation: 0 m (0 ft)
- Population (2023): 5,762
  - Density: 96.52/km^{2} (250.0/sq mi)
- Time zone: UTC−04:00 (AST)
- INSEE/Postal code: 97121 /97116
- ^{1} French Land Register data, which excludes lakes, ponds, glaciers > 1 km^{2} (0.386 sq mi or 247 acres) and river estuaries.

Pointe-Noire (French pronunciation: [pwɛ̃t nwaʁ]; Guadeloupean Creole: Pwentnwa) is a commune on Guadeloupe, a French overseas department in the Caribbean. It is located on the northwest coast of the island of Basse-Terre.

== Population ==
Historical population
| Year | Pop. | ±% p.a. |
|---|---|---|
| 1967 | 8,114 | — |
| 1974 | 7,324 | −1.45% |
| 1982 | 7,698 | +0.62% |
| 1990 | 7,537 | −0.26% |
| 1999 | 7,689 | +0.22% |
| 2007 | 7,115 | −0.97% |
| 2012 | 6,785 | −0.95% |
| 2017 | 6,107 | −2.08% |
| 2023 | 5,762 | −0.96% |
Source: INSEE

== Education ==
Public preschools include:

- Ecole maternelle Baille-Argent
- Ecole maternelle Bellevue Rosalie

Public primary schools include:

- Ecole primaire Baille-Argent
- Ecole primaire Timoleon Berbain
- Ecole primaire Renaud David
- Ecole primaire Bardochan Faustin
- Ecole primaire Guyonneau
- Ecole primaire Annerose Maurice

Public junior high schools include:

- Collège Courbaril

Public senior high schools include:

- LPO de Pointe-Noire (including the SEP)

== See also ==
- Communes of the Guadeloupe department
