= Sainte-Rose, Guadeloupe =

Sainte-Rose
- Commune
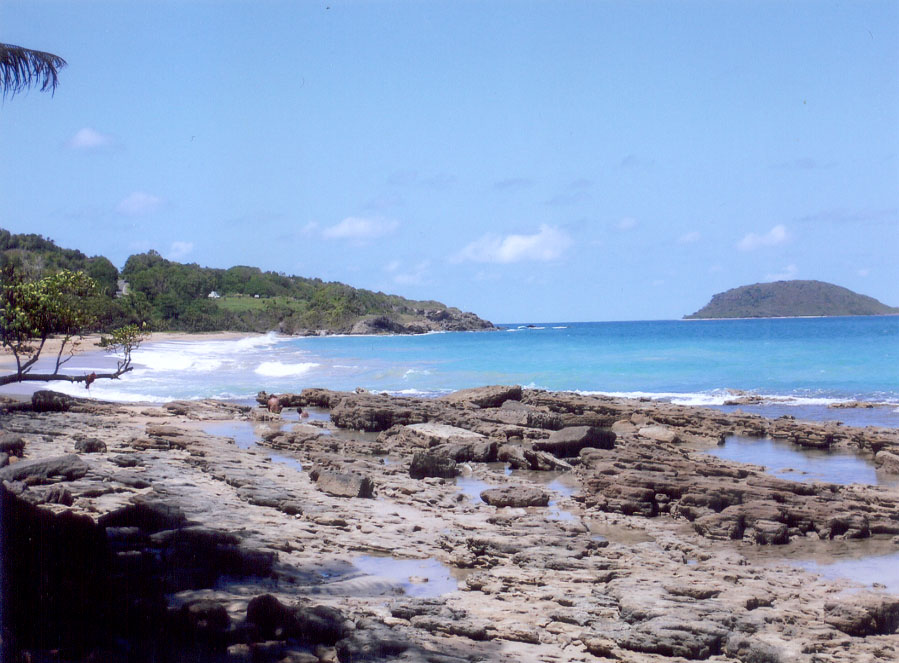
- Clugny Beach at Sainte-Rose

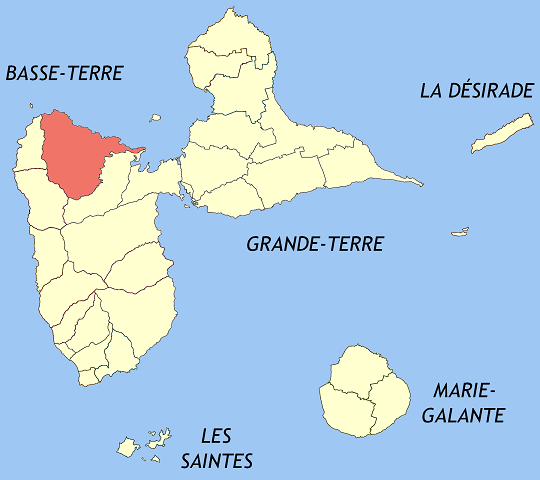
- Location of the commune (in red) within Guadeloupe
- Location of Sainte-Rose
- Coordinates: 16°20′00″N 61°42′00″W
- Country: France
- Overseas region and department: Guadeloupe
- Arrondissement: Basse-Terre
- Canton: Sainte-Rose-1 and 2
- Intercommunality: CA Nord Basse-Terre

Government
  - Mayor (2022–2026): Adrien Baron
- Area^{1}: 118.60 km^{2} (45.79 sq mi)
- Highest elevation: 758 m (2,487 ft)
- Lowest elevation: 0 m (0 ft)
- Population (2023): 17,700
  - Density: 149/km^{2} (387/sq mi)
- Time zone: UTC−04:00 (AST)
- INSEE/Postal code: 97129 /97115
- ^{1} French Land Register data, which excludes lakes, ponds, glaciers > 1 km^{2} (0.386 sq mi or 247 acres) and river estuaries.

Sainte-Rose (French pronunciation: [sɛ̃t ʁoz]; Guadeloupean Creole: Sentwòz) is a commune in the department of Guadeloupe. It is the second largest commune of Guadeloupe, in terms of area, after Petit-Bourg. Sainte-Rose lies on the coast of the island of Basse-Terre.

== History ==
The Hôtel de Ville

The Hôtel de Ville was completed in 1931.

== Population ==
Historical population
Year	Pop.	±% p.a.
1967	11,624	—
1974	12,050	+0.52%
1982	12,299	+0.26%
1990	13,995	+1.63%
1999	17,574	+2.56%
2007	19,738	+1.46%
2012	20,379	+0.64%
2017	19,162	−1.22%
2023	17,700	−1.31%
Source: INSEE

== Education ==
Public preschools include:

- Ecole maternelle Archelon
- Ecole maternelle Bourg 1 Ste-Rose
- Ecole maternelle Bourg 2
- Ecole maternelle Beauperthuy Daniel
- Ecole maternelle La Boucan
- Ecole maternelle Madame
- Ecole maternelle Viard

Public primary schools include:

- Ecole primaire Bis Cadet
- Ecole primaire La Boucan
- Ecole primaire Bourg 1 Ste-Rose
- Ecole primaire Bourg 2 Ste- Rose
- Ecole primaire Duzer
- Ecole primaire Reimonenq Joseph
- Ecole primaire Madame
- Ecole primaire Morne Rouge
- Ecole primaire Morne Zizi

Public junior high schools include:

- Collège Bébel
- Collège Bois Rada

Public senior high schools include:

- LGT Sonny Rupaire

== See also ==
- Communes of the Guadeloupe department
