= Daniel Marsin =

French politician

Daniel Marsin (born November 13, 1951, in Pointe-à-Pitre, Guadeloupe) is a member of the Senate of France, representing the island of Guadeloupe. He is locally a member of Guadeloupe unie, socialisme et réalités, and at the national level of the Modern Left, a satellite organisation of Nicolas Sarkozy' Union for a Popular Movement. He is a member of the parliamentary group European Democratic and Social Rally in the French Senate.

== Biography ==
After completing graduate studies in public economics and planning at Paris-Panthéon-Assas University and specializing in public and private management, he pursued a career as an inspector and senior bank executive.

In September 1995, he became mayor of Les Abymes following the sudden death of René-Serge Nabajoth, for whom he had served as first deputy mayor. Re-elected in 2001, he lost the mayoral seat in 2008, defeated by Éric Jalton.

A member of the National Assembly representing Guadeloupe's 1st constituency from 1997 to 2002, he was defeated in the 2002 legislative elections following divisions within the left.

A senator since 2004, he is a member of the European Democratic and Social Rally group(RDSE). In the Senate, he serves as vice-chair of the Committee on the Economy, Sustainable Development, and Regional Planning, deputy chair of the France-West Africa Group, and a member of the National Commission for the Evaluation of Overseas State Policies.

He ran again in the 2011 Senate elections but did not advance to the second round.

== Bibliography ==
- Page on the French Senate website
