= Leo Andy =

Guadeloupean politician (born 1938)

Leo Andy (born December 9, 1938, in Capesterre-Belle-Eau, Guadeloupe) is a politician from Guadeloupe who was a member of the French National Assembly from 1995 to 2002.
