= Max Mathiasin =

French politician (born 1956)

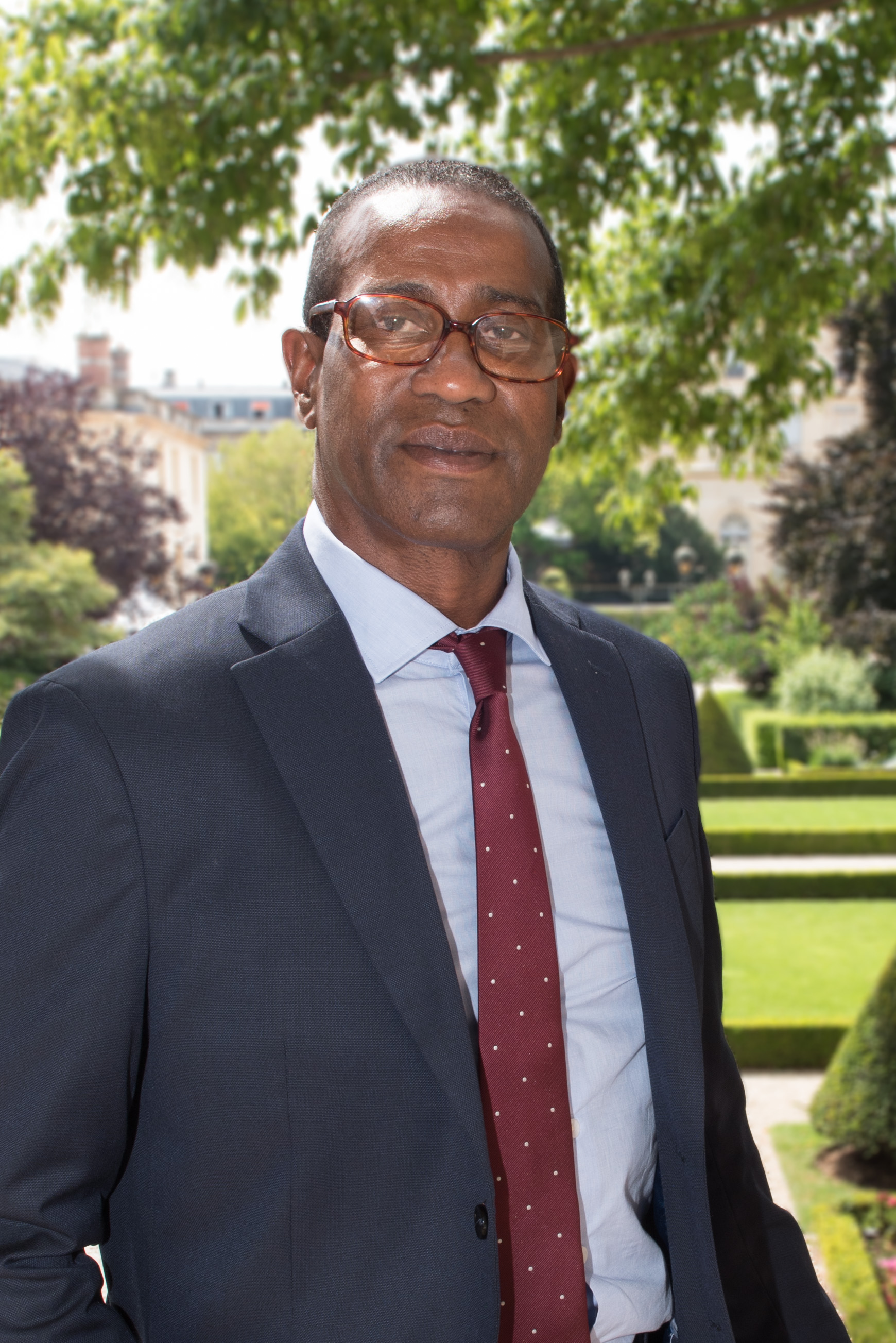

Member of the National Assembly for Guadeloupe's 3rd constituency
- Incumbent
- Assumed office 21 June 2017
- Preceded by: Ary Chalus

Personal details
- Born: 24 February 1956 (age 70) Deshaies, Guadeloupe
- Party: Miscellaneous left
- Other political affiliations: Socialist (until 2015)

Max Mathiasin (French pronunciation: [maks matjazɛ̃]; born 24 February 1956) is a French politician who has been a member of the National Assembly since 2017, representing Guadeloupe's 3rd constituency.
