= Canton of Capesterre-Belle-Eau =

Coordinates: 16.05°N 61.57°W

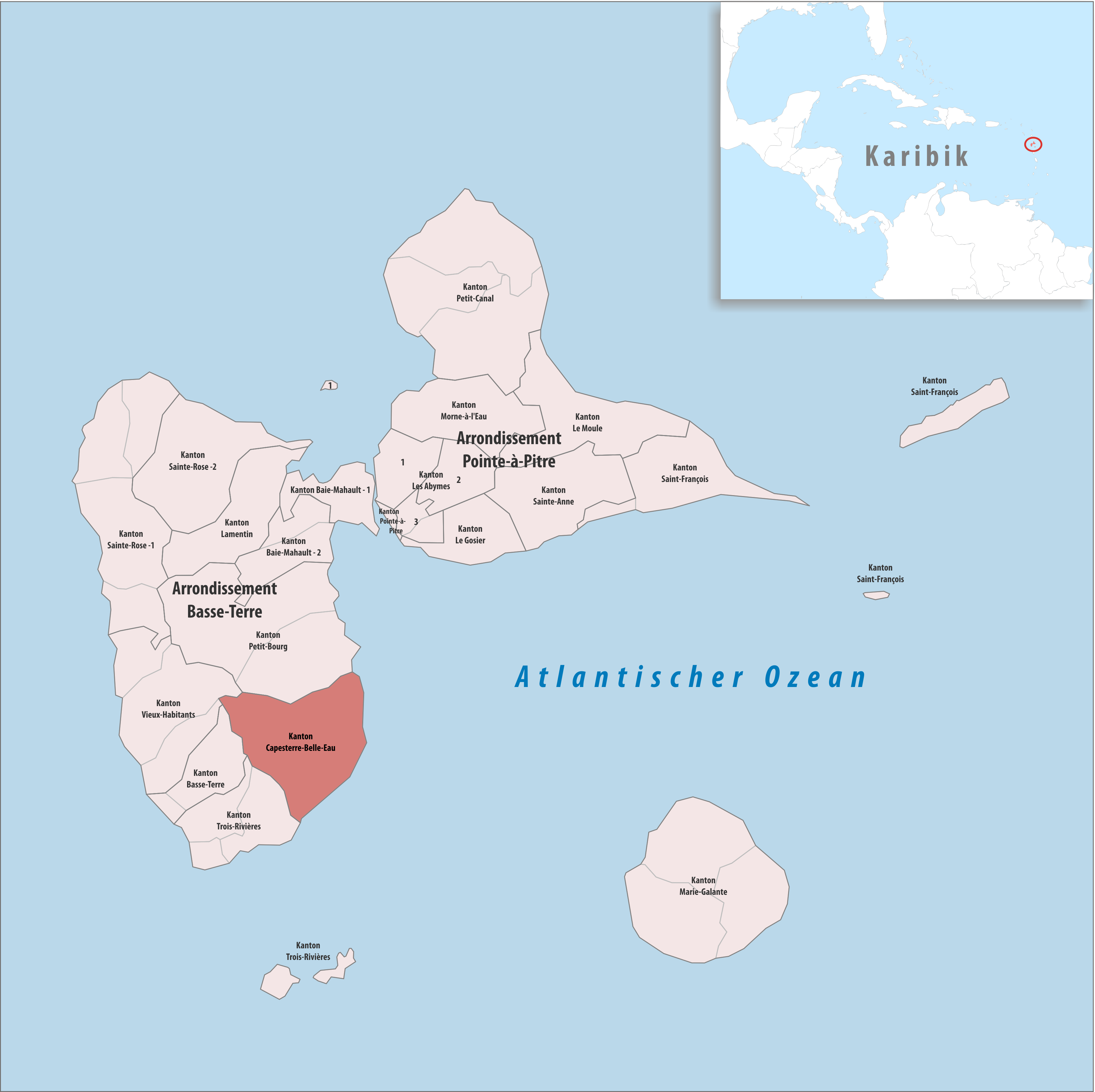

The canton of Capesterre-Belle-Eau is an administrative division of Guadeloupe, an overseas department and region of France. It was created at the French canton reorganisation which came into effect in March 2015. Its seat is in Capesterre-Belle-Eau.

It consists of the following communes:

1. Capesterre-Belle-Eau
