= Canton of Basse-Terre =

Administrative division of Guadeloupe

Coordinates: 16.00°N 61.73°W

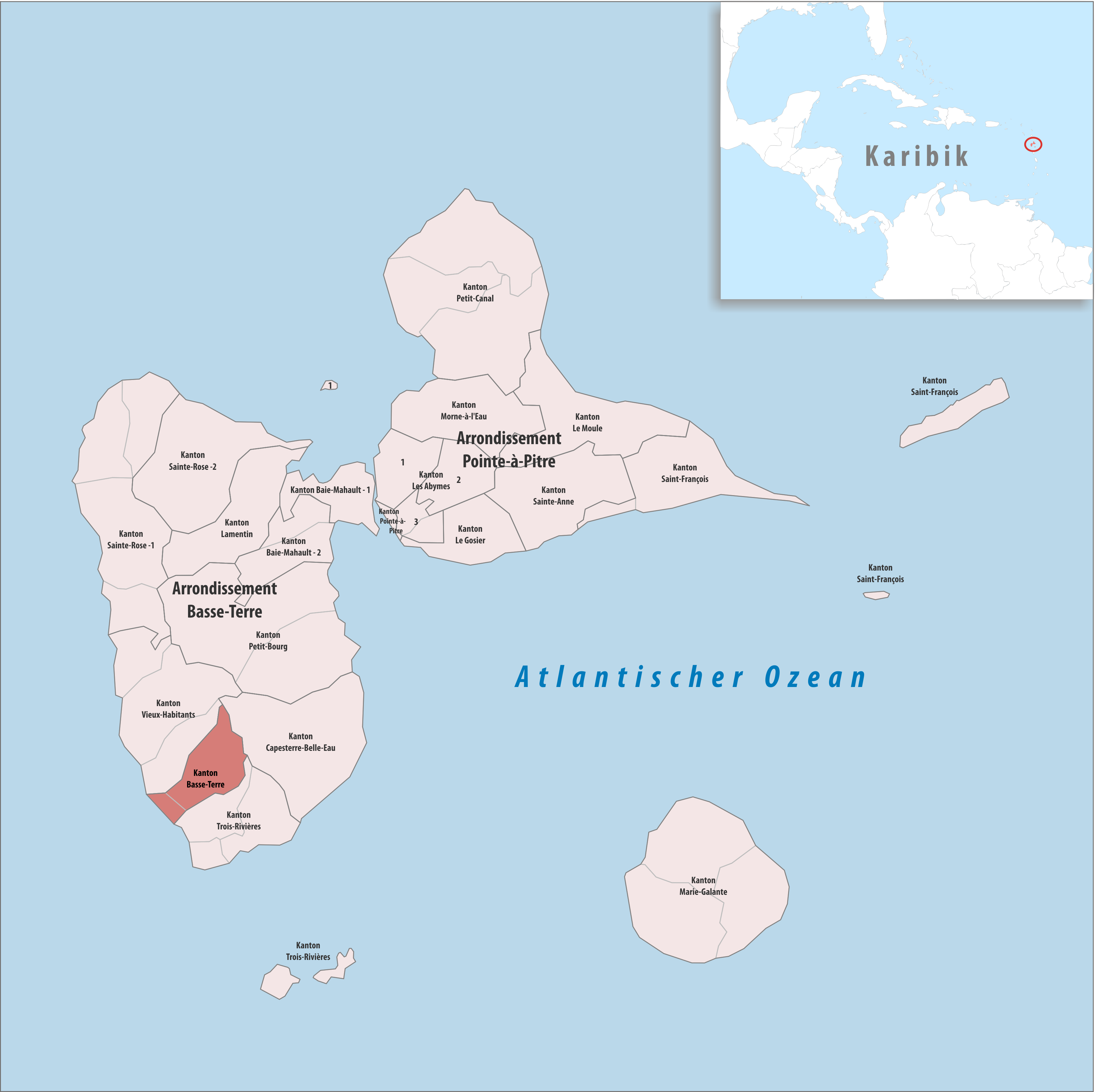

The canton of Basse-Terre is an administrative division of Guadeloupe, an overseas department and region of France. It was created at the French canton reorganisation which came into effect in March 2015. Its seat is in Basse-Terre. the Territory’s capital.

It consists of the following communes:

1. Basse-Terre
2. Saint-Claude
