= Canton of Sainte-Rose-1 =

Coordinates: 16.35°N 61.73°W

Sainte-Rose-1
- Canton
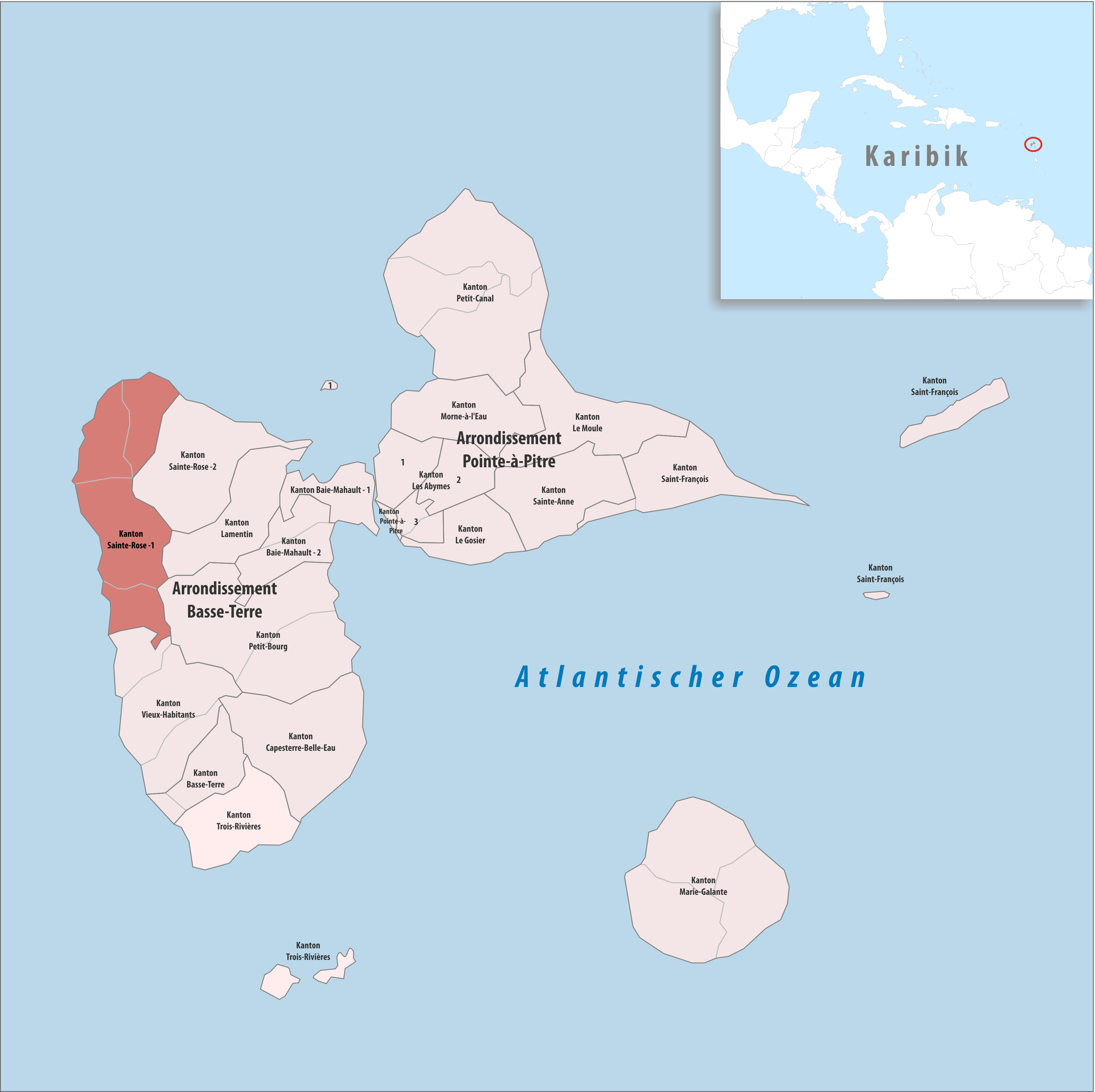
- Country: France
- Overseas region and department: Guadeloupe{{{region}}}
- No. of communes: {{{nbcomm}}}
- Population (2023): 14,692
- INSEE code: 971 18

Canton of Sainte-Rose-1 is a canton in the Arrondissement of Basse-Terre on the island of Guadeloupe.

== Municipalities ==
Since the French canton reorganisation which came into effect in March 2015, the communes of the canton are:

- Bouillante (partly)
- Deshaies
- Pointe-Noire
- Sainte-Rose (partly)

== See also ==
- Cantons of Guadeloupe
- Communes of Guadeloupe
- Arrondissements of Guadeloupe
