= Saint-Claude, Guadeloupe =

Saint-Claude
- Commune
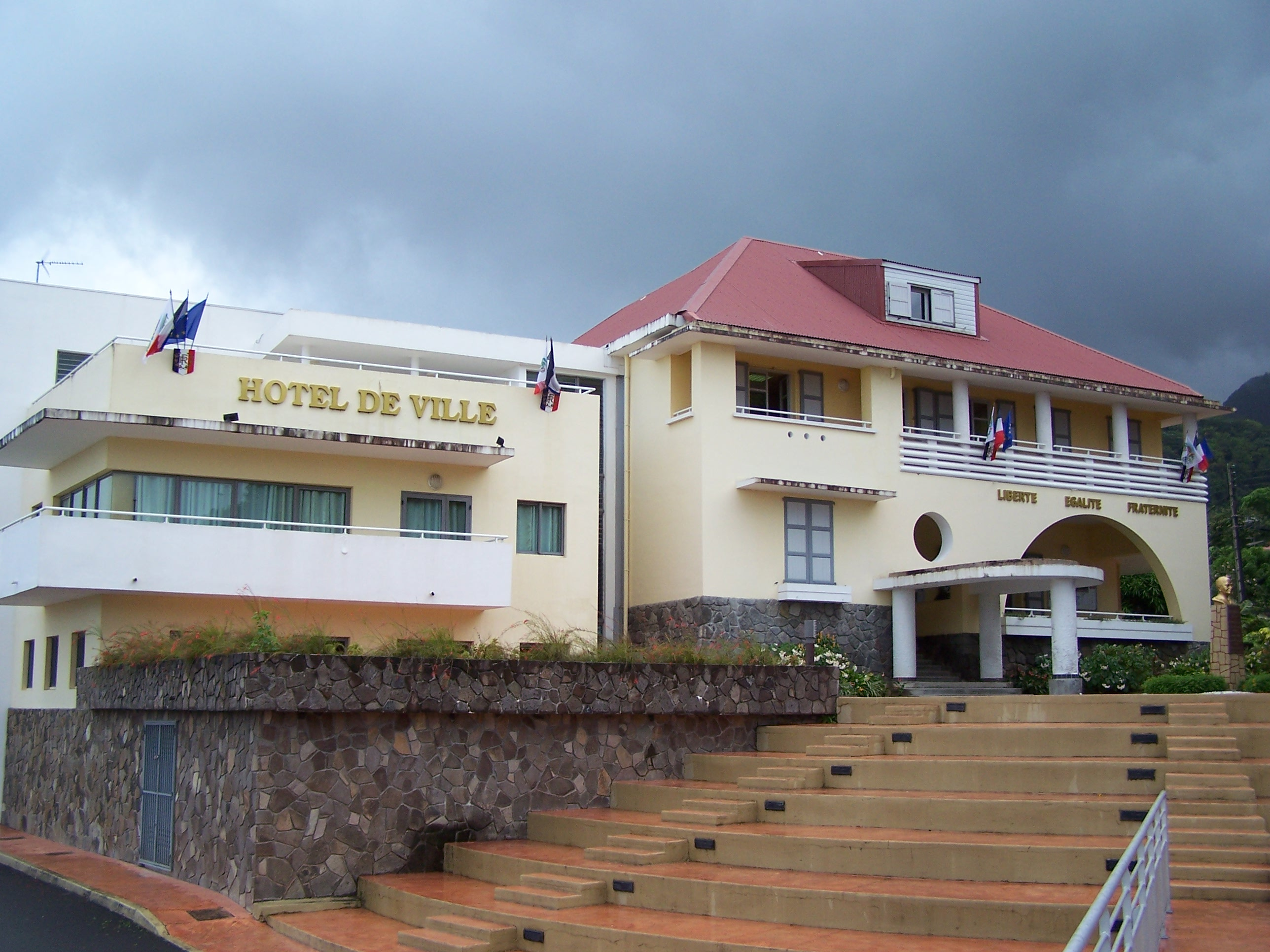
- The new town hall of Saint-Claude

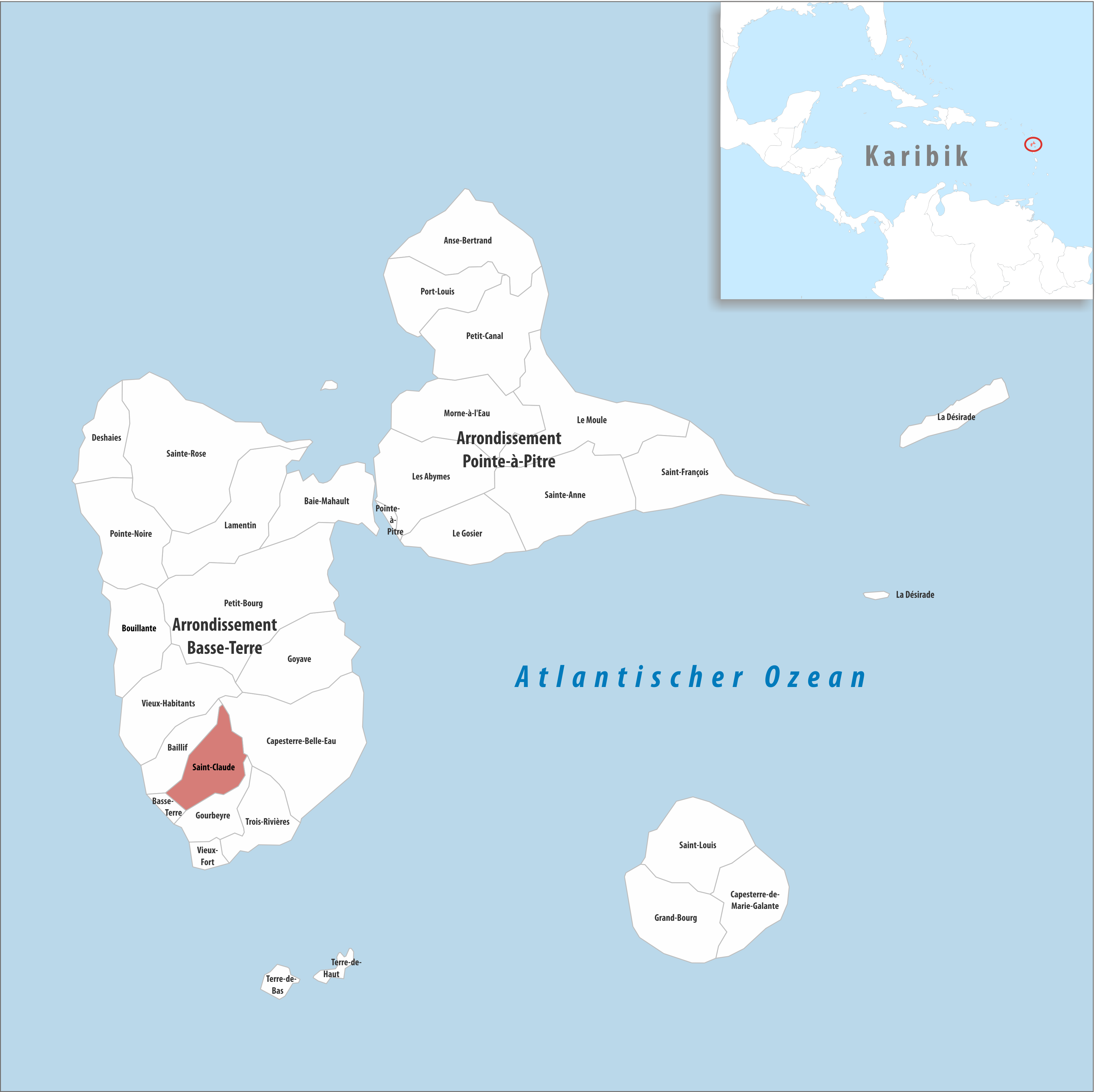
- Location of Saint-Claude
- Coordinates: 16°02′00″N 61°42′00″W
- Country: France
- Overseas region and department: Guadeloupe
- Arrondissement: Basse-Terre
- Canton: Basse-Terre
- Intercommunality: CA Grand Sud Caraïbe

Government
  - Mayor (2022–2026): Lucie Weck-Mirre
- Area^{1}: 34.30 km^{2} (13.24 sq mi)
- Population (2023): 10,177
  - Density: 296.7/km^{2} (768.5/sq mi)
- Time zone: UTC−04:00 (AST)
- INSEE/Postal code: 97124 /97120
- ^{1} French Land Register data, which excludes lakes, ponds, glaciers > 1 km^{2} (0.386 sq mi or 247 acres) and river estuaries.

Saint-Claude (French pronunciation: [sɛ̃ klod]; Guadeloupean Creole: Senklòd) is a commune in the French overseas department of Guadeloupe. It lies in the interior of southern Basse-Terre Island, just northeast of the capital city of Basse-Terre.

== Population ==
Historical population
Year	Pop.	±% p.a.
1967	10,295	—
1974	9,745	−0.78%
1982	8,943	−1.07%
1990	10,316	+1.80%
1999	10,237	−0.09%
2007	10,548	+0.37%
2012	10,439	−0.21%
2017	10,381	−0.11%
2023	10,177	−0.33%
Source: INSEE

== Education ==
Public preschools and primary schools include:

- Ecole primaire Bourg 2 St-claude
- Ecole primaire Louis Chalcol
- Ecole primaire Félix Laban
- Ecole maternelle Nelson Rose
- Ecole maternelle Arlette Salomon

Public junior high schools include:

- Collège Rémy Nainsouta

Public senior high schools include:

- LDM du commerce, des services et de l'artisanat Ducharmoy

Private primary schools include:

- Ecole primaire privée Saint Joseph de Cluny

== Notable people ==
- Raymond Guilliod (1919–2005), politician

== See also ==
- Communes of the Guadeloupe department
