= Capesterre-Belle-Eau =

- Commune
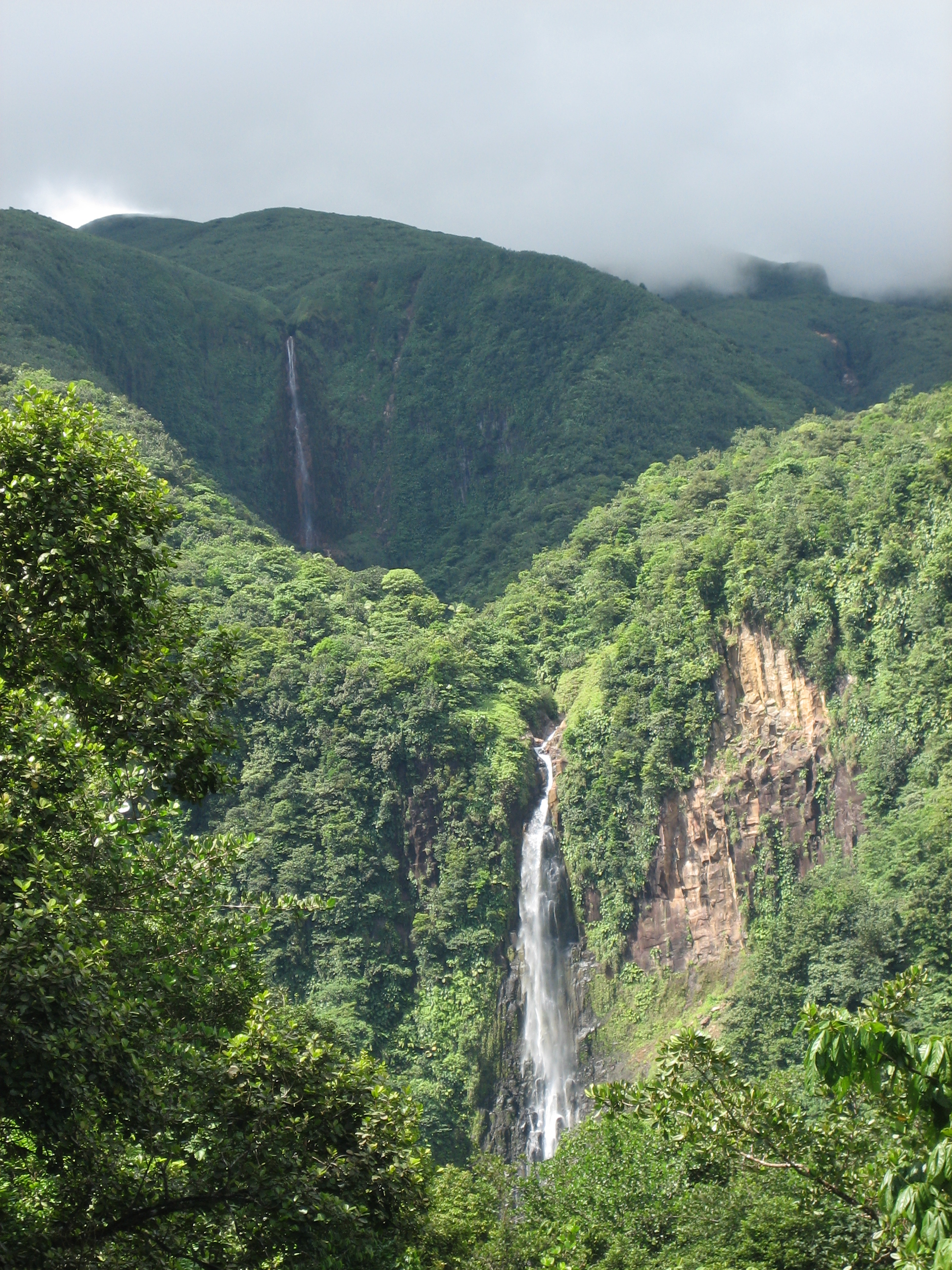
- The Carbet waterfall, in Capesterre-Belle-Eau

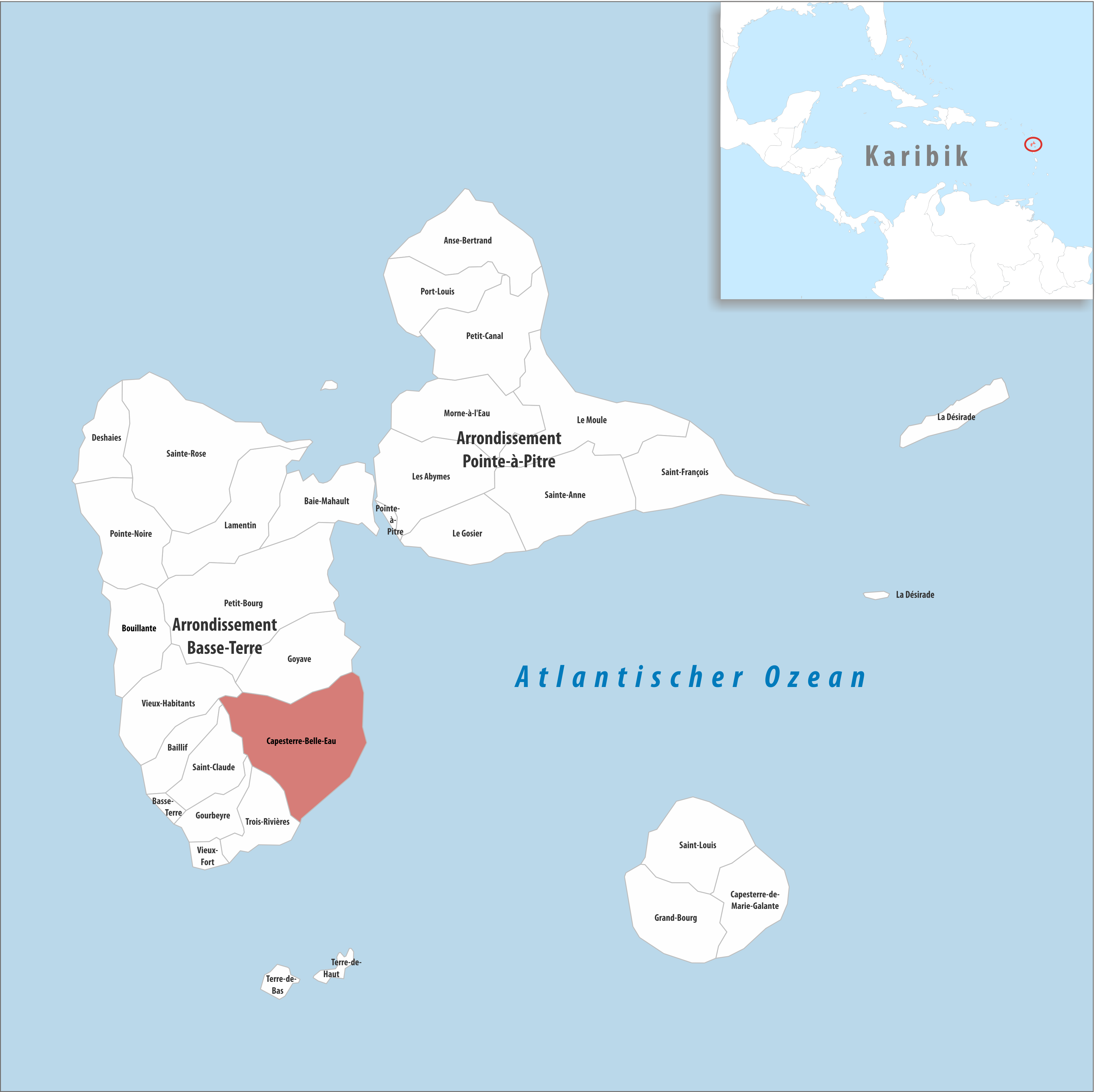
- Location of the commune (in red) within Guadeloupe
- Location of Capesterre-Belle-Eau
- Location within France
- Coordinates: 16°03′N 61°34′W
- Country: France
- Overseas region and department: Guadeloupe
- Arrondissement: Basse-Terre
- Canton: Capesterre-Belle-Eau
- Intercommunality: CA Grand Sud Caraïbe

Government
  - Mayor (2020–2026): Jean-Philippe Courtois
- Area^{1}: 103.30 km^{2} (39.88 sq mi)
- Population (2023): 17,684
  - Density: 171.19/km^{2} (443.38/sq mi)
- Time zone: UTC−04:00 (AST)
- INSEE/Postal code: 97107 /97130
- ^{1} French Land Register data, which excludes lakes, ponds, glaciers > 1 km^{2} (0.386 sq mi or 247 acres) and river estuaries.

Capesterre-Belle-Eau (French pronunciation: [kapɛstɛʁ bɛlo]; Guadeloupean Creole: Kapèstè Bèlo) is a commune in the French overseas region and department of Guadeloupe, in the Lesser Antilles. It is located in the south-east of Basse-Terre Island. Capesterre-Belle-Eau covers an area of 103.3 km^{2} (39.884 sq mi). Its population was 17,684 in 2023. The population density is 172 persons per km^{2}. The inhabitants are called Capesterriens in French.

== Etymology ==
Its name comes from an expression of the navy of the 17th century: cab-be-ground, which indicates a ground exposed to the east wind. The abundance of the cascades, the rivers and the water levels led to the addition of the phrase Belle Eau, hence the name Capesterre-Belle-Eau.

== History ==
Petroglyphs discovered in the rivers of Peru (river) and Bananier show the presence of Native Americans.

On 4 November 1493, Christopher Columbus's second voyage unloaded there. Columbus would have met Amerindians. To commemorate this event, a bust of the navigator was raised in 1916 at the entry of Sainte-Marie.

In the 17th century, Charles Houël gave land to Dutch colonists driven out of Brazil, so that they could grow sugarcane there. After the abolition of chattel slavery in 1848, Indian indentured workers were hired to replace the plantation slaves. They built a temple in the Shangy district.

Near the Bois Debout estate, on a small way leading to an underwood, a flagstone in the Cemetery of the Slaves, requires the visitors to "Honor and Respect" the memory of the slaves. Several tens of unnamed tombs oriented "head towards Africa" are there.

== Geography ==
The town is located at the south-east of the Basse-Terre and is located south of the Capesterre River. Basse-Terre, the capital is 26 km (16 mi) south-west and Pointe-à-Pitre is 35 km (22 mi) north-north-east.

Carbet Falls comprises three cascades.

== Climate ==
Capesterre-Belle-Eau experiences rainfall throughout the year, with a wetter season between July and November that coincides with hurricane season. The city receives 2000–2500 mm of rainfall. Tropical heat brings constant highs of around 32 °C (89 °F) that drop to 20 °C (68 °F) at night.

Trade winds, called alizés, blow from the northeast and often temper the climate.

== Economy ==
The economy is geared towards agriculture, particularly bananas, thanks to the quality of the soil. Farmers cultivate sugar cane, cocoa, vanilla, coffee, pineapples and vegetables of all kinds.

A rum distillery operates there.

== Population ==
Historical population
Year	Pop.	±% p.a.
1967	17,912	—
1974	18,143	+0.18%
1982	17,472	−0.47%
1990	19,012	+1.06%
1999	19,568	+0.32%
2007	19,520	−0.03%
2012	19,407	−0.12%
2017	18,270	−1.20%
2023	17,684	−0.54%
Source: INSEE

== Education ==
Public preschools include:

- Ecole maternelle Cayenne
- Ecole maternelle Fonds Cacao
- Ecole maternelle Ilet Pérou
- Ecole maternelle Saint Sauveur
- Ecole maternelle Sainte Marie
- Ecole maternelle Sarlasonne

Public primary and elementary schools include:

- Ecole primaire Beuve Anatole
- Ecole primaire Bananier
- Ecole primaire Belair
- Ecole primaire Cambrefort
- Ecole primaire Amédée Fengarol
- Ecole primaire Ilet Pérou
- Ecole primaire Joliot-Curie Frédéric
- Ecole primaire L'Habituée
- Ecole primaire Minatchy Léonce
- Ecole primaire Sainte Marie
- Ecole élémentaire Alexius de lacroix

Preschool/primary school groups include:

- Groupe scolaire Arsene Monrose

Public junior high schools include:

- Collège Germain Saint-Ruf
- Collège Sylviane Telchid

Public senior high schools include:

- LDM de l'automobile Paul Lacave

== Personalities ==
- Amédée Fengarol (1905-1951), Guadeloupean politician
- Sonny Rupaire, poet
- Henry Sidambarom (1863–1952), a Justice of the Peace and defender of the cause of Indian workers in Guadeloupe
- Sylviane Telchid, writer and professor

== See also ==
- Communes of the Guadeloupe department
- Basse-Terre Island
