= United Guadeloupe, Solidary and Responsible =

United Guadeloupe, Solidary and Responsible Guadeloupe unie, solidaire et responsable
- Abbreviation: GUSR
- President: Guy Losbar
- Vice Presidents: Véronique Gréard; Thérèse Marianne Pépin
- Founded: 1994
- Split from: Guadeloupe Federation of the Socialist Party
- Headquarters: Basse-Terre
- Ideology: Social liberalism Autonomism
- Political position: Centre
- National affiliation: Ensemble Citoyens (since 2021); Renaissance (since 2017)
- Seats in the National Assembly: 1 / 577
- Seats in the Senate: 1 / 348

Website
- guadeloupe-unie.fr

United Guadeloupe, Solidary and Responsible (French: Guadeloupe unie, solidaire et responsable; abbreviated GUSR), formerly known as United Guadeloupe, Socialism and Facts (French: Guadeloupe unie, socialisme et réalités), is a political party in the French overseas department of Guadeloupe. The party was founded by Dominique Larifla, a former socialist member of parliament and former president of the Department Council of Guadeloupe. The party is close to the Modern Left and used to have a Senator sitting in the European Democratic and Social Rally. The party has one seat in the French National Assembly, in the group of the Socialist Party. The party also has one seat in the Senate. The party was also formerly aligned with the Left Radical Party and is now aligned with Renaissance.

== See also ==
- Category:United Guadeloupe, Solidary and Responsible politicians
