= Tropical Storm Jerry (2025) =

Atlantic tropical storm in 2025

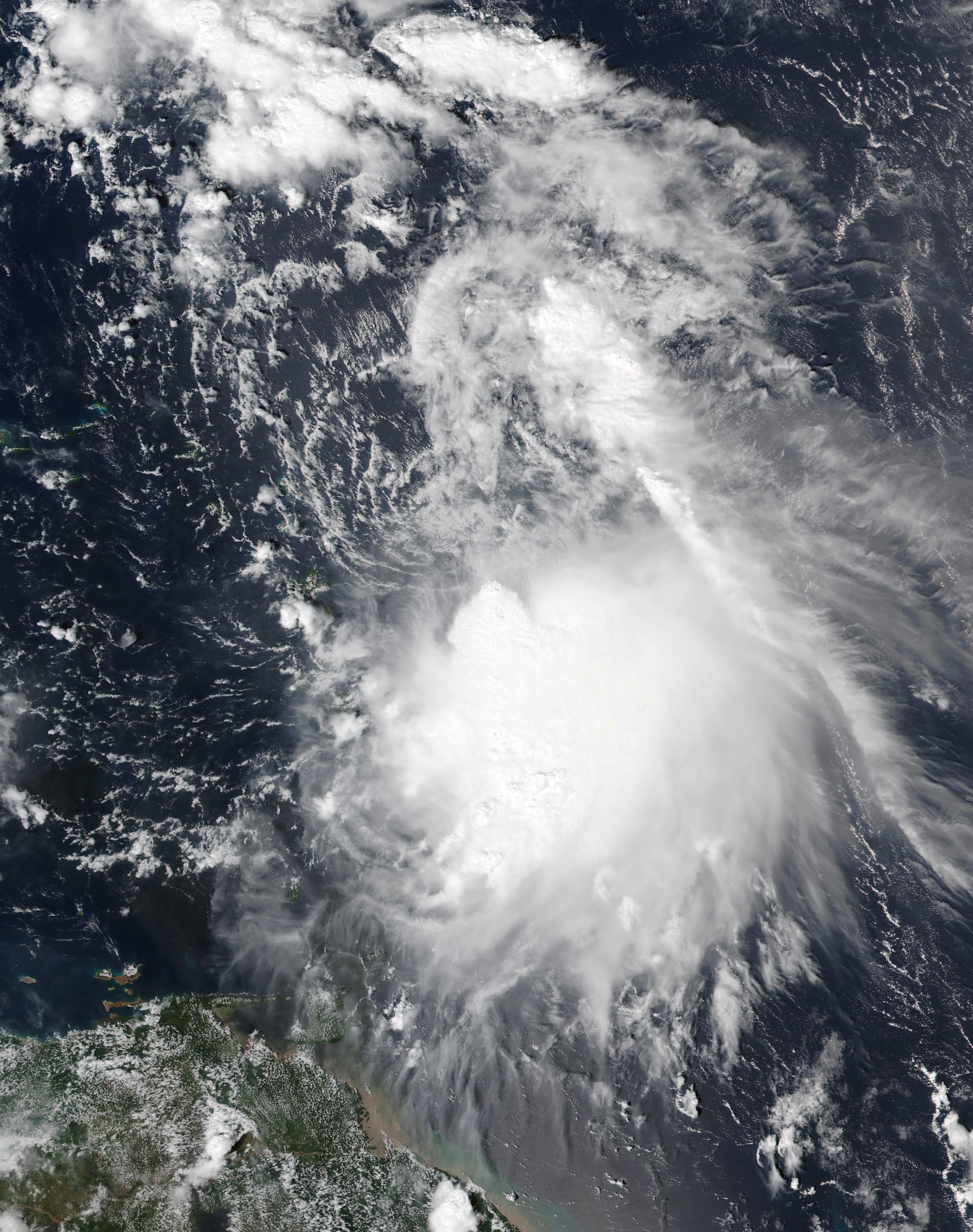
- Tropical Storm Jerry east of the Leeward Islands on October 9

Meteorological history
- Formed: October 7, 2025
- Dissipated: October 11, 2025

Tropical storm
- 1-minute sustained (SSHWS/NWS)
- Highest winds: 65 mph (100 km/h)
- Lowest pressure: 1000 mbar (hPa); 29.53 inHg

Overall effects
- Fatalities: 1 direct
- Damage: $351,000 (2025 USD)
- Areas affected: Lesser Antilles
- IBTrACS
- Part of the 2025 Atlantic hurricane season

Tropical Storm Jerry was a poorly organized but strong tropical storm that brought strong winds and heavy rain to the Leeward Islands in October 2025. The tenth named storm of the 2025 Atlantic hurricane season, Jerry originated from a tropical wave that moved off the coast on Africa on October 3. The wave began to quickly move west, with intermittent convective bursts. The wave began to organize eventually strengthened into a tropical storm well east of the Leeward Islands. The storm continued a rapid west-northwest motion while moving toward the Leeward Islands. The system gradually strengthened, however, any significant intensification was impeded by wind shear and dry air. Jerry then reached a peak maximum sustained winds of 65 miles per hour (105 km/h) and a minimum central pressure of 1,000 mb (30 inHg) on October 8. The storm then maintained this intensity while slowing down and gradually turning north while skirting the Leeward Islands to the east before weakening and opening up to a trough and dissipating well southeast of Bermuda on October 11.

As Jerry approached the Leeward Islands, tropical cyclone warnings and watches were issued for portions of the Lesser Antilles. Tropical storm force winds, flooding, and landslides were reported throughout the Leeward Islands. Impact was the worst on Guadeloupe with €300,000 (US$349,000) worth of damage occurring on the island alone. Several homes and crops sustained considerable water damage. Additionally, more than 5,000 households were left without power and several people were rescued from boats caught in rough seas generated by Jerry. Additionally, a man drowned as a result of Jerry's flood waters sweeping his car away. However, outside of Guadeloupe, little damage was reported as the heaviest of the rain associated with Jerry fell over open waters due to the majority of convection being located on the eastern side of the storm. Overall damage from the storm totaled to US$351,000.

== Meteorological history ==
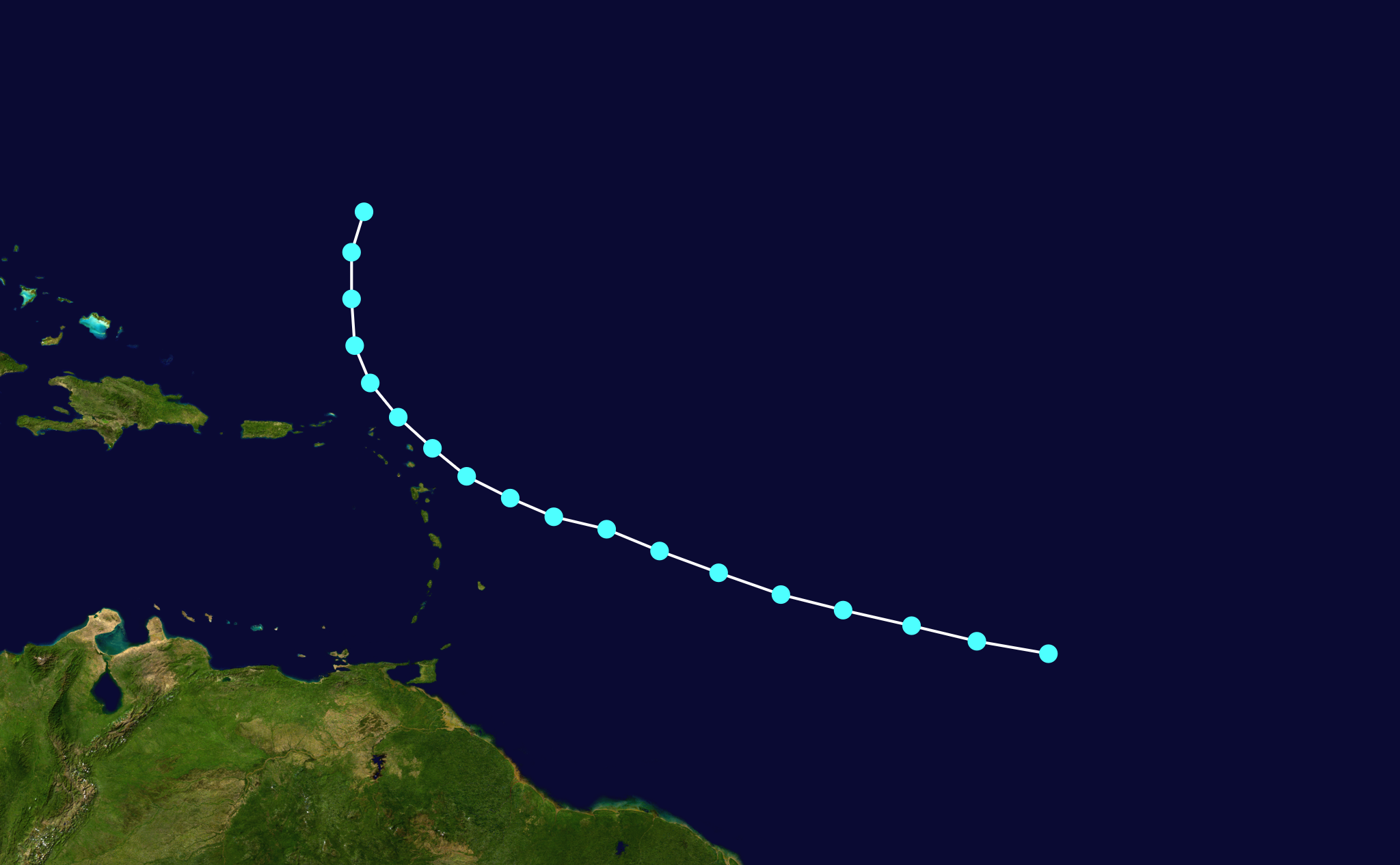
Map plotting the storm's track and intensity, according to the Saffir–Simpson scale Map key Saffir–Simpson scale Tropical depression (≤38 mph, ≤62 km/h) Tropical storm (39–73 mph, 63–118 km/h) Category 1 (74–95 mph, 119–153 km/h) Category 2 (96–110 mph, 154–177 km/h) Category 3 (111–129 mph, 178–208 km/h) Category 4 (130–156 mph, 209–251 km/h) Category 5 (≥157 mph, ≥252 km/h) Unknown Storm type Tropical cyclone Subtropical cyclone Extratropical cyclone, remnant low, tropical disturbance, or monsoon depression

On October 1, the National Hurricane Center (NHC) began noting that a tropical wave could emerge off the coast of Africa and interact with another disturbance in the Eastern Atlantic. Two days later, a tropical wave emerged off the coast of Africa. On October 4, a large area of low pressure associated with the wave formed south of Cape Verde. The next day, the system grew more organized was designated as Invest 95L. The system organized further over the next few days and was designated Tropical Storm Jerry on October 7 at 15:00 UTC after developing a low-level center and organized thunderstorm activity, with the majority of the convection bursting on the east side of the storm. Jerry began quickly moving westward and strengthening while riding along the south-southwest side of a subtropical ridge. However, any significant intensification was hindered by strong wind shear, intrusions of dry air, and the fast forward motion of the storm. While turning west-northwestward, Jerry would appear disorganized and sheared the next day, with the majority of convection being displaced to the southern and eastern sides of the storm. Despite moving into a less conducive environment for strengthening, the system was able to increase its maximum sustained winds due to warm sea surface temperatures and a moist environment. Jerry then peaked with maximum sustained winds of 65 miles per hour (105 km/h) and a minimum central pressure of 1,000 mb (30 inHg) on October 8 at 12:00 UTC. The next day, the storm then began to slow its forward motion while maintaining a lopsided structure, with all convection and strong winds to the east of the center of circulation. Jerry weakened slightly, with its center becoming fully exposed by 21:00 UTC the same day. The next day, Jerry turned northward due to the influence of a subtropical ridge. Throughout the day, Jerry moved into the shear vector. Jerry was also embedded into a trough. By October 11, Jerry was found to have poorly-defined center, opening into a trough and dissipating later that day. Remnant moisture from Jerry merged with a frontal boundary and developing nor'easter three days later.

== Preparations and impact ==
On October 7, tropical storm watches were issued for several of the northern Leeward Islands. On October 9, the watches for Anguilla, Barbuda, Guadeloupe, Saint Barthélemy, and Saint Martin were upgraded to warnings. Some orange alerts were also issued by Météo-France for Saint Barthélemy, Guadeloupe, Saint Martin, and Martinique. Guadeloupe was placed under both a tropical storm warning and a red alert by Météo-France. Around 200 firefighters and 40 gendarmeries were mobilized. Two hundred residents in Saint-François were evacuated from flood prone areas. Additionally, farmers placed hail nets over their crops and used pumps to drain fields in low-lying areas. A celebration of the emancipation of slaves on Saint Barthélemy was cancelled. The Jour de la Nuit in Gustavia was cancelled. A shelter of two classrooms was opened on the island in Gustavia and managed by the Red Cross and reserves. Airports in Saint Martin (Grand Case Airport and Princess Juliana International Airport) suspended operations for 13 hours. and government offices in Sint Maarten were closed on October 10. A symposium by Governor Ajamu Baly was postponed for five days due to the tropical storm warning issued for the island. The Gustaf III Airport was closed on October 10.

=== Guadeloupe ===
Heavy rainfall from Jerry caused moderate flooding throughout portions of Guadeloupe. In a six hour period, 7.1 inches (180 mm) of rain fell on Grande-Terre. In La Désirade, winds gusted up to 67 miles per hour (108 km/h) and precipitation totaled to 8.7 inches (220 mm) in a 12 hour period, the equivalent to one-and-a-half months of rain. Waves in the seas around Guadeloupe reached heights around 11–13 feet (3.5–4 m). The Layon River swelled 6.6 feet (2 m) above its normal level. In Petit-Bourg and Capesterre-Belle-Eau, fifteen emergency calls were reported involving flooding up to 1.6 feet (50 cm) in the basements and ground floors of structures. Approximately 100 homes were left isolated after fifteen roads were damaged by mudslides. A sewage canal collapsed, washing away 66 feet (20 m) of a road. In La Désirade, strong winds damaged the roofs of 20 homes. Approximately ten vehicles were swept away by floodwaters. In Port-Louis, 50 tuna boats were forced to dock at ports, causing a potential loss of €100,000 (US$116,000) for fishermen. Hotels in Saint-François saw a 30% decrease in guests due to flight cancellations. At least 500 residents fled to shelters during the storm.

At least 62 flood-related rescues were reported. In Basse-Terre, seven people were rescued after a cargo ship was hit by rough seas and was later beached. In Le Gosier, two boats sank and a woman was rescued after her sailboat encountered rough seas. Additionally, a motorist was rescued after their vehicle was swept away by floodwaters. Residents sought refuge to higher ground after floodwaters overtook their homes and vehicles. At the height of the storm, 5,000 households were left without power. Several major roads, and businesses, including a pharmacy in Pointe-à-Pitre, were inundated by floodwaters. Goods at a computer equipment store were damaged after water leaked into the building. Motorists were stranded and commercial offices and schools were closed due to flooded roads. Downed trees were reported in the Périnet district. In Saint-François, several homes were declared uninhabitable due to severe flood damage, and tomato, yam, and cucumber farmers suffered total crop losses. Severe vegetable shortages in markets were reported as a result. In Grande-Terre, floodwaters damaged sugarcane crops, leading to a loss of food for livestock. In Anse-Bertrand, families were affected by flooding exacerbated by poor drainage. In Le Moule, a 53-year-old man drowned after floodwaters from Jerry swept away his car.

In Les Abymes, rooms in a condominium were flooded up to 0.98 feet (30 cm), destroying furniture and electronics. Additionally, 40% of homes in flood risk areas had their garages inundated. Banana farmers lost 10% of their crops due to strong winds and flooding from Jerry. Drinking water in the municipalities of Vieux-Habitants and Pointe-Noire was contaminated, resulting in the temporary shutdown of four water treatment facilities. Material damage from Jerry totaled to €300,000 (US$349,000).

In the aftermath of the storm, supply convoys in Petit-Bourg distributed food and water to those affected. Fifty technicians were mobilized to repair power lines damaged by fallen tree branches. A state of agricultural disaster was declared in nine municipalities. Additionally, compensation claims were opened for farmers affected by the storm.

=== Elsewhere ===
In Antigua and Barbuda, rainfall amounted to more than 9 inches (230 mm) in some areas, a large part registered within a 3-hour period, generating flash floods and minor landslides locally but no major damages. Roads became partially impassable after being inundated by floodwaters. Additionally, several football games were postponed after playing fields were inundated by floodwaters. Equipment at the MET office building in Antigua was damaged after the structure sustained significant flood and roof damage. Several graves at a cemetery were flooded. Offices at the V. C. Bird International Airport reported minor flood damage along with flight delays and cancellations. Two rescues were reported after vehicles became stranded in floodwaters. Power outages affected the operation of water treatment facilities. The rainfall was considered beneficial, replenishing reservoirs and helping end a four-month long drought.

On Martinique, 5.9 inches (150 mm) fell cumulatively on the island. The north of the island received less rain than other parts. Waves on the island reached 13–16 feet (4–5 m). In the morning of October 10, around 2,400 customers were without power. The north side of the island was the most affected by power outages, with 1,400 reports there alone. A wall collapsed onto a parked car in Pointe Hyacinthe. In Le François, severe weather severed a power line. Gusts of 56 miles per hour (90 km/h) were recorded on Saint Barthélemy. Gusts of 47 miles per hour (75 km/h) were reported in Saint Martin. In Saint Kitts and Nevis, an American Airlines flight was forced to abort a landing due to inclement weather caused by Jerry. In Dominica, 9.4–10.6 inches (240–270 mm) of rain fell in Saint Patrick Parish and Saint Joseph Parish. Moisture from Jerry generated severe thunderstorms over Puerto Rico. Lightning strikes damaged a utility pole and a pine tree. A road near a hospital in Vega Baja was inundated, causing traffic disruption. Damage in the territory totaled to US$2,000.

== See also ==
- Weather of 2025
- Tropical cyclones in 2025
- Other storms of the same name
