= Guenette, Guadeloupe =

Settlement in Guadeloupe

Coordinates: 16°19′45″N 61°20′12″W

Guenette is a settlement in Guadeloupe in the commune of Le Moule, on the island of Grande-Terre. It is located to the east of Guillocheau and Laureal, and to the south of Conchou; Dubedou and Zevallos lie to its east, and Gardel and Renard to its south.
