= La Rosette =

Settlement in French overseas region of Guadeloupe

- Location of La Rosette
- Coordinates: 16°20′19″N 61°22′42″W
- Country: France
- Department: Guadeloupe
- Arrondissement: Grande-Terre
- Commune: Le Moule

La Rosette is a settlement in the commune of Le Moule in the French overseas department of Guadeloupe. It is located on the island of Grande-Terre in the Lesser Antilles in the Caribbean. It is the site of the Edgar Clerc Archeological Museum, which exhibits Amerindian artifacts from the pre-Columbian era collected from the region.

== Geography ==
La Rosette is a settlement on the island of Grande-Terre. It is part of the French overseas department of Guadeloupe, located in the Lesser Antilles of the Caribbean. It is located to the west of Lemercier and to the south of Palais-Sainte-Marguerite. It is part of the commune of Le Moule, which is spread over an area of 82.8 km^{2} (32.0 sq mi) on the eastern part of the island, and had a population of 23,014 inhabitants in 2024.

La Rosette has a tropical rainforest climate (Af) as per the Köppen climate classification. The settlement has an average elevation of 37 m (121 ft).

The settlement is connected with downtown Le Moule via the D123 and N5 roads. The highway D123 extends from the settlement towards Pointe de la Grande Vigie. It consists of several inland lakes, coves, streams, and beaches along the coast. Several coral reefs straddle across the surrounding waters.

== Edgar Clerc museum ==
La Rosette is the site of the Edgar Clerc Archeological Museum. The museum building is built in a distinct architectural style, and is surrounded by a large park. The museum exhibits various Arawak and Carib artifacts from the Lesser Antilles. These Amerindian artifacts date to the pre-Columbian era and were collected by Edgar Clerc from the surrounding areas and islands.
