= La Berthaudiere =

Settlement in Guadeloupe

Coordinates: 16°28′40″N 61°28′39″W

La Berthaudiere is a settlement in Guadeloupe in the commune of Anse-Bertrand, on the island of Grande-Terre. Anse-Bertrand and Mahaudiere are to its west, and Pressec and Massioux lie to the south.
