= Gardel, Guadeloupe =

Settlement in Guadeloupe

Coordinates: 16°18′24″N 61°19′35″W

Gardel is a settlement in Guadeloupe in the commune of Le Moule, on the island of Grande-Terre. Boisvin is to its west, and Zevallos is to its east; to the north are Guillocheau, Laureal, Portland and Guenette.

It is the location of the last remaining sugar refinery of mainland Guadeloupe
