= La Mahaudière =

Settlement in Guadeloupe

Coordinates: 16°19′18″N 61°22′50″W

La Mahaudière is a settlement in Guadeloupe in the commune of Le Moule, on the island of Grande-Terre. It is located to the north of La Goguette and to the west of Pressec and La Berthaudiere.

== History ==
La Mauhadière was a sugar manufacturer in the 18th century, which at its height made 147 slaves work. It housed a distillery in the 19th century and then a factory until the 1950s. Since then, the settlement has not been maintained well.
