= Portland, Guadeloupe =

- Hamlet
- Map of Grande-Terre

- Map of Guadeloupe
- Coordinates: 16°19′22″N 61°19′25″W
- Country: France
- Overseas region and department: Guadeloupe
- Arrondissement: Pointe-à-Pitre
- Canton: Le Moule
- Intercommunality: CA Nord Grande-Terre
- Commune: Le Moule

Portland is a hamlet in Guadeloupe in the commune of Le Moule, on the island of Grande-Terre. It is located to the east of Guillocheau and Laureal, and to the west of Dubedou and Zevallos; Conchou is to its north.
