= Sainte-Marguerite, Guadeloupe =

Human settlement in Le Moule, Grande-Terre, Guadeloupe

Sainte-Marguerite is a settlement in Guadeloupe in the commune of Le Moule, on the island of Grande-Terre. It is located to the west of Palais-Sainte-Marguerite.
