= Laureal =

Commune settlement

Coordinates: 16°19′14″N 61°20′37″W

Laureal is a settlement in Guadeloupe in the commune of Le Moule, on the island of Grande-Terre. It is located to the south of Lemercier, Le Moule, and Conchou, and to the north of Fonds d'Or, Boisvin, Renard, and Gardel.
