= Lac de Gaschet =

Lake in Guadeloupe

Lake of Gaschet
- Lac de Gaschet (French)
- Location within the Caribbean
- Location: Port-Louis, Guadeloupe
- Coordinates: 16°25′N 61°29′W
- Basin countries: Guadeloupe (France)
- Max. length: 4 km (2.5 mi) (max)
- Surface area: 1 square kilometre (0 sq mi) (approx)
- Settlements: Port-Louis

Lac de Gaschet ('Gaschet Lake') or Barrage de Gaschet ('Gaschet Dam') is an artificial reservoir that forms the largest freshwater lake in Guadeloupe.

Located within the Port-Louis municipality, on the northern side of the Grande-Terre island, and adjacent to Petit-Canal municipality, the lake is known for its rich diversity of bird-life.

== History ==
The Lake was constructed in the early 1990s as part of an irrigation project to support local agriculture. It comes under the responsibility of the Guadeloupe Departmental Council.

== Geography ==
The Lake is approximately 4 km from the coast. It has several 'branches', of which one is crossed by the local road, D128. At its longest point it is approximately 4 km (2.5 mi) long, and has a surface area of about 100 ha. The dam which holds the water back, situated at the south-western end of the lake, is approximately 100 m long.

== Birdlife ==
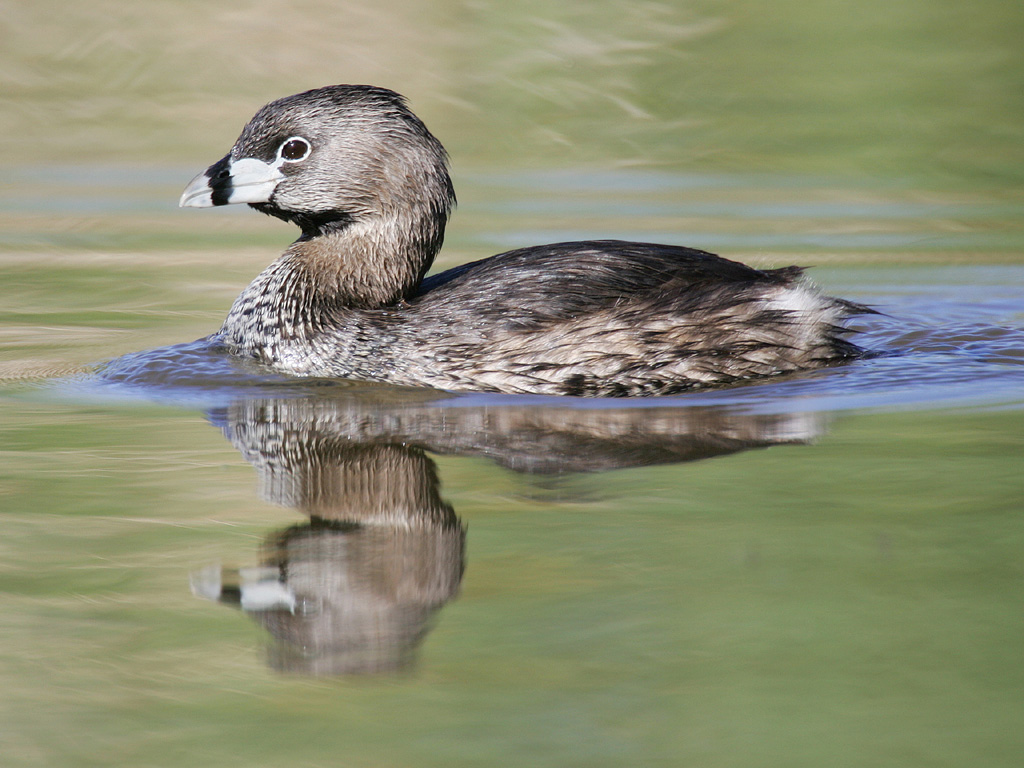
Pied-billed grebes occur in the IBA

The Lake is home to many water birds. Particularly numerous are masked ducks, pied-billed grebes and common moorhens. In 2000 the site was formally recognised as a natural zone of ecological interest, fauna and flora (ZNIEFF) and protected by fences, though some illegal shooting occurs. A 290 ha area, encompassing the lake and its immediate surrounds, has been recognised as an Important Bird Area (IBA) by BirdLife International.
