= Renard, Guadeloupe =

Coordinates: 16.4116°N 61.4919°W

Renard is a settlement in Guadeloupe, on the island of Grande-Terre. It is located to the west of Dubedou and Zevallos, and to the east of Boisvin; Guenette and Portland are to its north.
