= Port Louis (disambiguation) =

Port Louis is the capital of Mauritius.

Port Louis may also refer to:

- Port Louis District, a district of Mauritius
- Port Louis, Falkland Islands, a settlement on northeastern East Falkland
- Port-Louis, Guadeloupe, a commune in the Guadeloupe overseas department, France
- Port-Louis, Morbihan, a commune near Lorient in the Morbihan department, France
