= Boisvin =

Settlement in Guadeloupe

Coordinates: 16°17′48″N 61°20′58″W

Boisvin is a settlement in Guadeloupe in the commune of Le Moule, on the island of Grande-Terre. It is located to the east of Fonds d'Or, and to the south of Guillocheau and Laureal; Gardel and Renard are to its east.
