= Fonds d'Or =

Human settlement in France

Coordinates: 16.2998°N 61.3499°W

Fonds d'Or is a settlement in Guadeloupe, on the island of Grande-Terre. To its north are Guillocheau and Laureal, and Boisvin is immediately south.
