= Palais-Sainte-Marguerite =

Settlement in Guadeloupe

Coordinates: 16°20′39″N 61°23′37″W

Palais-Sainte-Marguerite is a settlement in Guadeloupe in the commune of Le Moule, on the island of Grande-Terre. It is located to the east of Sainte-Marguerite and to the west of Lemercier and Le Moule.
