= List of storms named Jerry =

The name Jerry has been used for seven tropical cyclones in the Atlantic Ocean:

- Hurricane Jerry (1989) – Category 1 hurricane which crossed over the Yucatán Peninsula and also struck Texas, killing three and causing $70 million in damages
- Tropical Storm Jerry (1995) – formed between Florida and the Bahamas, caused six deaths and $26.5 million in damages in the southeast United States
- Tropical Storm Jerry (2001) – passed south of Barbados and dissipated in the Caribbean Sea
- Tropical Storm Jerry (2007) – formed in the northern central Atlantic and stayed far from land
- Tropical Storm Jerry (2013) – formed and remained far from land
- Hurricane Jerry (2019) – Category 2 hurricane that stayed out to sea
- Tropical Storm Jerry (2025) – passed near the Lesser Antilles, affected Guadeloupe with heavy rainfall

== See also ==
- Cyclone Gerry (2003) – an intense Category 3 tropical cyclone which formed in the Southwest Indian Ocean
