= Zevallos, Guadeloupe =

Settlement in Guadeloupe

Coordinates: 16°18′19″N 61°18′09″W

A house in Zevallos

Zevallos is a settlement in Guadeloupe in the commune of Le Moule, on the island of Grande-Terre. Gardel and Renard are to its west; to its north is Conchou, and to its east are Guillot and Vezoux.
