= Mariani Maximin =

Mariani Maximin (13 June 1914 in Port-Louis, Guadeloupe - 7 July 2011) is a politician from Guadeloupe who served in the French National Assembly from 1978 to 1981.

== Biography ==
Born on June 13, 1914, in Port-Louis, Guadeloupe, a town in northern Guadeloupe, Mariani Maximin pursued a career in the French National Education in France, eventually rising to the position of middle school principal. He was also awarded the title of Commander of the Order of Academic Palms.

A man of strong convictions, he played a prominent role in Guadeloupean politics from the 1960s through the early 1980s. From 1965 to 1975, he served as mayor of Petit-Bourg, representing first the Union of Democrats for the Republic (UDR) and later the Rally for the Republic (RPR). He also served as a General Councilor for the canton of Petit-Bourg from 1967 to 1979.

On March 19, 1978, Mariani Maximin was elected to the National Assembly of the French Fifth Republic in Guadeloupe’s 2nd constituency, still as a member of the Rally for the Republic; he served in this capacity until May 1981. He was appointed an Officer of the National Order of Merit.

On July 6, 2011, at the age of 97, Mariani Maximin passed away in Petit-Bourg, the town to which he had devoted ten years of his life as mayor.

== Bibliography ==
- page on the French National Assembly website
- Notice of Death
