= Anse-Bertrand =

Commune in Guadeloupe, France

- Commune
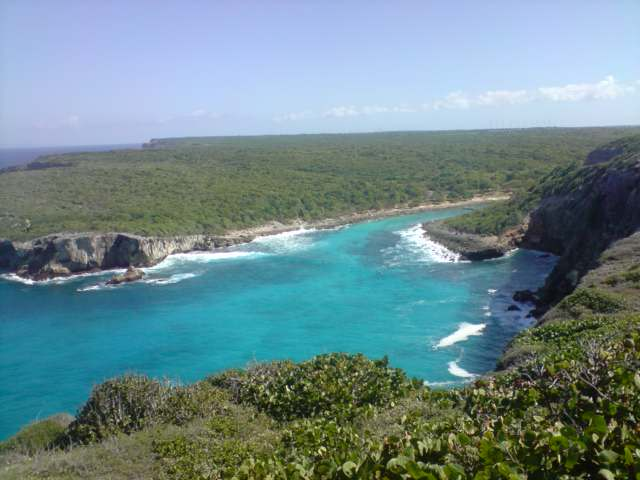
- La Porte d'Enfer (The Gate of Hell), Anse-Bertrand

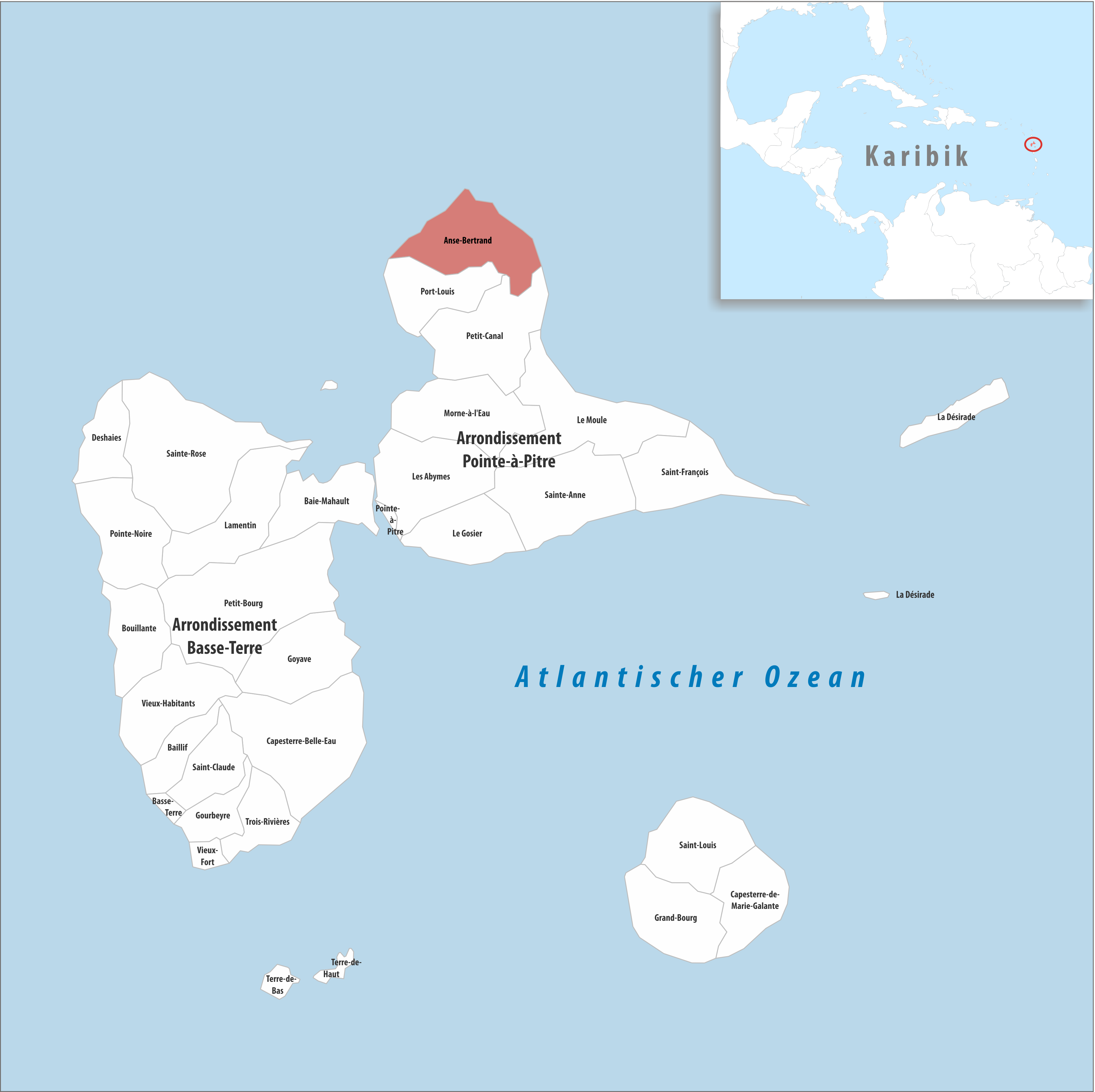
- Location of the commune (in red) within Guadeloupe
- Location of Anse-Bertrand
- Coordinates: 16°28′N 61°31′W
- Country: France
- Overseas region and department: Guadeloupe
- Arrondissement: Pointe-à-Pitre
- Canton: Petit-Canal
- Intercommunality: CA Nord Grande-Terre

Government
  - Mayor (2020–2026): Édouard Delta
- Area^{1}: 62.50 km^{2} (24.13 sq mi)
- Population (2023): 4,412
  - Density: 70.59/km^{2} (182.8/sq mi)
- Time zone: UTC−04:00 (AST)
- INSEE/Postal code: 97102 /97121
- ^{1} French Land Register data, which excludes lakes, ponds, glaciers > 1 km^{2} (0.386 sq mi or 247 acres) and river estuaries.

Anse-Bertrand (French pronunciation: [ɑ̃s bɛʁtʁɑ̃]; Guadeloupean Creole: Lansbétran) is a commune in Guadeloupe, an overseas region and department of France in the Lesser Antilles.

The inhabitants in Anse-Bertrand are called Ansois.

== Geography ==
Anse-Bertrand is located in northern Grande-Terre. The town is 35 km (22 mi), north-north-east of Pointe-à-Pitre. The Atlantic Ocean face the town and produces high waves for professional surfers. The town is located on a limestone plateau where rolling hills are located eastwards.

Some settlements depend on the commune of Anse-Bertrand, such as:

- La Berthaudiere
- Massioux
- Pressec

=== Climate ===
Like any other Eastern Caribbean town, Anse-Bertrand experiences quite evenly spread rainfall during the year, with a wetter season between July and November which coincides with hurricane season. The town receives below 1500 mm of rainfall. Tropical heat is the norm, bringing constant high temperatures, especially during the summer.

Trade winds, called alizés, blow from the north-east and often temper the climate.

== History ==
This village was the last refuge of Carib Amerindians in Grande-Terre (Carib Territory).

== Population ==
Historical population
| Year | Pop. | ±% p.a. |
|---|---|---|
| 1967 | 5,136 | — |
| 1974 | 4,653 | −1.40% |
| 1982 | 4,570 | −0.22% |
| 1990 | 4,800 | +0.62% |
| 1999 | 5,023 | +0.51% |
| 2007 | 4,712 | −0.80% |
| 2012 | 5,045 | +1.38% |
| 2017 | 4,275 | −3.26% |
| 2023 | 4,412 | +0.53% |
Source: INSEE

== Economy ==
The economy rests primarily on agriculture, particularly on sugar cane. There was sugar cultivation in the 1800s, but it ended. It is endowed with a rich past whose remnants you can see through a number of windmills scattered over the commune such as Habitation La Mahaudière. The beach, Anse Bertrand, is great for surfing on Grade-Terre. There are hotels southwards, toward Pointe-a-Pitre.

== Sights ==
In Anse-Bertrand the landscape is scenic, especially places such as "Pointe de la Grande Vigie" situated at the most northernmost part of the archipelago.

Point Large Watchtower is located on the northern point of the Guadeloupe. High cliffs up to 80 meters tall, plunges in the Atlantic Ocean in perpetual movement. Here nature impresses by its beauty and its violence. By good weather, seen on La Désirade (50 km), Antigua (70 km) and Montserrat (80 km).

Carry Hell is encircled by cliffs, a small calm and limpid water, arm of the sea to the turquoise reflections, gently comes to die on a white sand beach. With far the ocean continues to thunder. The paradise with the doors of the hell…

There are other serene beaches such as Plage de la Chapelle, Anse Laborde (1.1 miles, north), Anse Pistolet & Anse du Souffleur (2.8 miles, south-west). Saint Jacques horse racecourse, is nearby.

== Education ==
Public preschools and primary schools include:

- Ecole primaire Guéry
- Ecole primaire Macaille
- Ecole élémentaire Jules Plaisance
- Ecole maternelle Campêche
- Ecole maternelle Adela Deschamps

Public junior high schools include:

- Collège Fernand Ballin

== Personalities ==
- Dominik Bernard, a French actor and stage director.
- Yohann Gène (1981-), a French professional road bicycle racer.
- Serge Nubret (1938-), a former professional bodybuilder, bodybuilding federation leader, movie actor and author, awarded bodybuilding titles including : 1970 IFBB Mr. Europe, 1976 NABBA Mr. Universe (Pro.) and 1977 WBBG Mr. World (Pro.).
- Lilian Thuram (1972-), a retired professional football defender, winner with the French national team of the 1998 FIFA World Cup .

== Sister city ==
In November 1994, Anse-Bertrand became a sister city to the city of Columbus, Ohio, United States.

== See also ==
- Communes of the Guadeloupe department
