= Hôtel de Ville, Le Moule =

Town hall in Le Moule, Guadeloupe, France

Hôtel de Ville
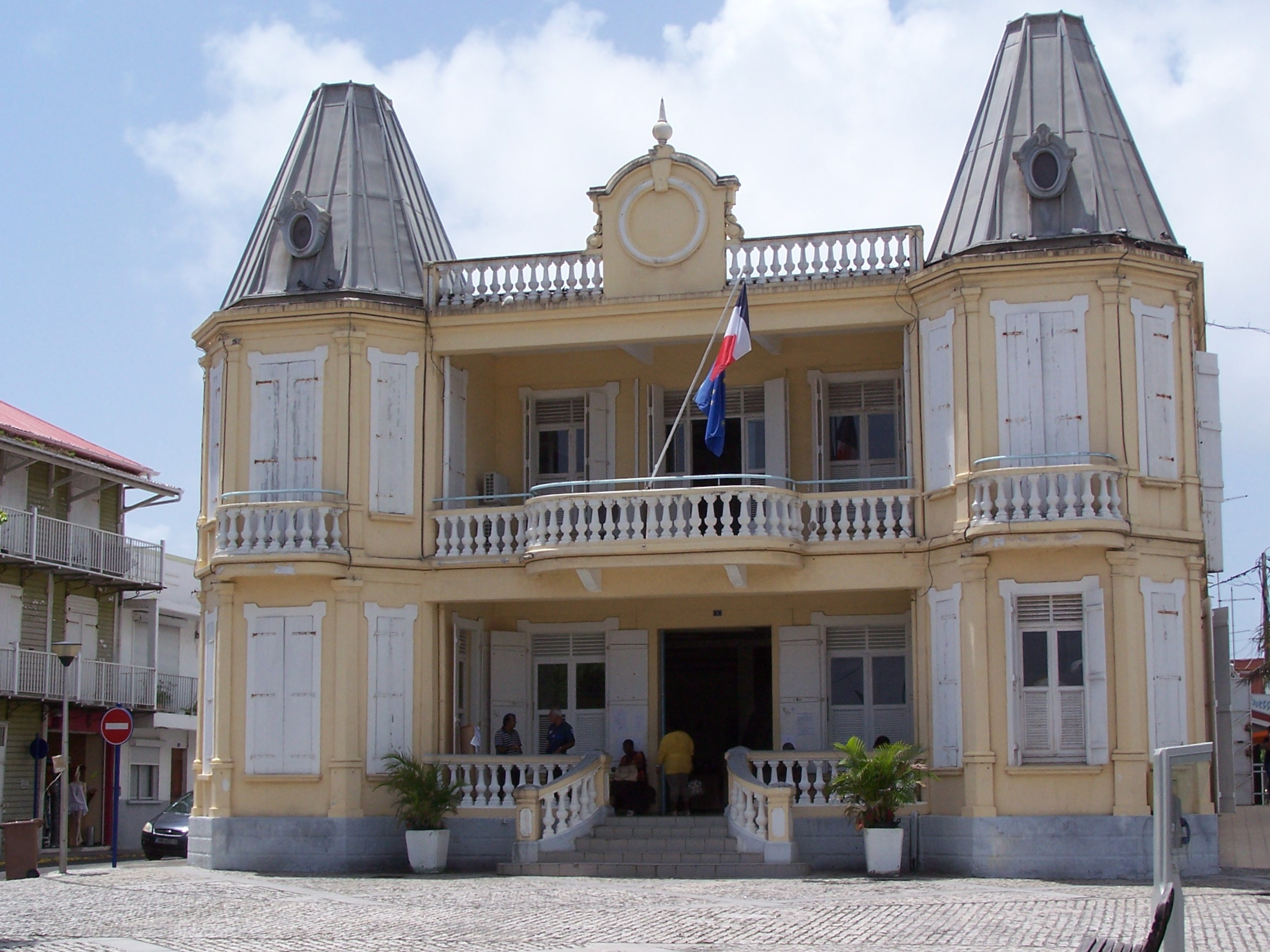
- The main frontage of the Hôtel de Ville in May 2013
- Interactive map of the Hôtel de Ville area

General information
- Type: City hall
- Architectural style: Art Deco style
- Location: Le Moule, Guadeloupe
- Coordinates: 16.3312°N 61.3437°W
- Completed: 1927

Design and construction
- Architect: Georges Lecardez

The Hôtel de Ville (French pronunciation: [otɛl də vil], City Hall) is a municipal building in Le Moule, Guadeloupe in the Caribbean Sea, standing on Rue Joffre.

== History ==
By the mid-19th century, following significant population growth associated with the role of the town as a port, the town council decided to commission their first town hall. The site they selected was in the heart of the old town close to the Church of Saint-Jean-Baptiste. The building was designed in the traditional Creole style and built using timber-frame construction techniques.

In the mid-1920s, the town council decided to commission a more substantial town hall. The foundation stone for the new building was laid by the mayor, Charles Romana, on 28 October 1926. It was designed by Georges Lecardez in the Art Deco style, built by Société Anonyme d'Entreprises Industrielles de la Guadeloupe in concrete and was officially opened by the Governor of Guadeloupe, Théophile Antoine Pascal Tellier, on 26 June 1927.

The design involved symmetrical main frontage of five bays facing onto the town square. The central section of three bays was formed by loggias with balustrades on both floors. At roof level there was another balustrade which was broken by a round-headed pediment containing a large medallion. The outer bays were formed by distinctive octagonal towers with conical zinc roofs. Internally, the principal room was the Salle du Conseil (council chamber).

On 12 September 1928, a severe hurricane devastated Guadeloupe, severely damaging buildings and leading to 1,200 deaths. In the aftermath of the hurricane, the town hall survived on account of its concrete method of construction, but many other buildings, such as the Church of Saint-Jean-Baptiste were badly damaged.

A war memorial, in the form of a statue of a soldier on a pedestal which was intended to commemorate the lives of local service personnel who had died in the First World War was unveiled to the west of the town hall in 1938.
