= Massioux =

Human settlement in Guadeloupe

Coordinates: 16°27′43″N 61°27′47″W

Massioux is a settlement in Guadeloupe in the commune of Anse-Bertrand on the island of Grande-Terre. It is to the east of Pressec.
