= Lemercier, Guadeloupe =

Coordinates: 16°19′44″N 61°21′17″W

Lemercier is a settlement in Guadeloupe in the commune of Le Moule, on the island of Grande-Terre. It is located to the east of La Rosette and Palais-Sainte-Marguerite; Le Moule is to its west.
