= Hurricane Jerry (1989) =

Category 1 Atlantic hurricane

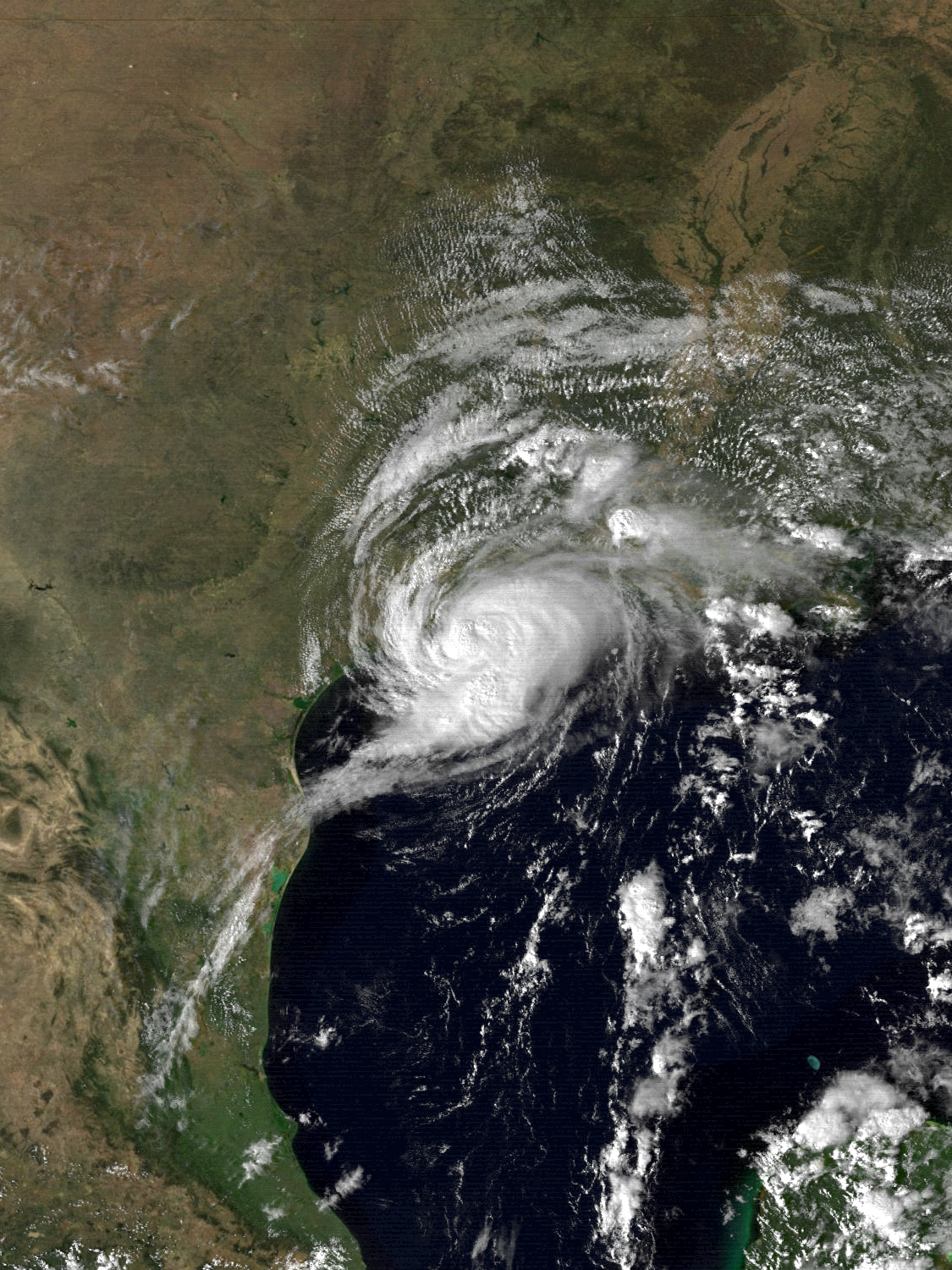
- Hurricane Jerry at peak intensity near landfall in Texas on October 15

Meteorological history
- Formed: October 12, 1989
- Dissipated: October 16, 1989

Category 1 hurricane
- 1-minute sustained (SSHWS/NWS)
- Highest winds: 85 mph (140 km/h)
- Lowest pressure: 982 mbar (hPa); 29.00 inHg

Overall effects
- Fatalities: 3 direct
- Damage: $70 million (1989 USD)
- Areas affected: Texas, eastern United States
- IBTrACS
- Part of the 1989 Atlantic hurricane season

Hurricane Jerry caused minor damage in Texas and flash flooding in Kentucky and Virginia in October 1989. The fourteenth tropical cyclone, tenth named storm, and seventh hurricane of the season, Jerry developed from a tropical wave in the Bay of Campeche on October 12. Initially a tropical depression, the system moved north-northwestward across the Gulf of Mexico and strengthened into Tropical Storm Jerry early on the following day. Jerry continuously deepened until October 14 and then maintained intensity while curving northeastward and briefly decelerating. Later that day, the storm re-curved north-northwestward. Jerry began to intensify on October 15 and soon became a Category 1 hurricane on the Saffir–Simpson hurricane wind scale. Early on October 16, Jerry made landfall on Galveston Island, Texas with winds of 85 miles per hour (137 km/h). Less than six hours later, Jerry weakened to a tropical storm and then a tropical depression shortly thereafter. Late on October 16, Jerry was absorbed by a frontal system while situated over southwestern Arkansas.

Storm surge and rough surf along the coast of Texas destroyed a 20-mile (32 km) section of Texas State Highway 87, which was never repaired. Due to strong winds, about 52,000 homes and businesses were left without electricity, most of them in the Galveston area. Many homes, businesses, and buildings were inflicted damage because of strong winds and three tornadoes spawned by the storm. Despite the issuance of a hurricane warning just eight hours prior to landfall, Jerry caused only three fatalities in Texas, possibly due to the storm's small size; a car fell over the Galveston Seawall, killing its three occupants. Minor wind and coastal flood damage was reported in Louisiana. Jerry and its remnants brought flash flooding to portions of the Upland South, particularly in the states of Kentucky, Virginia, and West Virginia. In eastern Kentucky, hundreds of homes were flooded and many bridges, culverts, and roads were washed out; this left hundreds of residents stranded. Damage in Kentucky reached at least $5 million. Similar impact occurred in Virginia; with $3.4 million (1989 USD) (Note: All damage totals are in 1989 United States dollars.) in damage in Buchanan County. In West Virginia, overflowing rivers in the western portions of the state forced hundreds to evacuate. Throughout the United States, Jerry resulted in about $70 million in damage (1989 USD, $181 million 2026 USD).

== Meteorological history ==
Map plotting the storm's track and intensity, according to the Saffir–Simpson scale Map key Saffir–Simpson scale Tropical depression (≤38 mph, ≤62 km/h) Tropical storm (39–73 mph, 63–118 km/h) Category 1 (74–95 mph, 119–153 km/h) Category 2 (96–110 mph, 154–177 km/h) Category 3 (111–129 mph, 178–208 km/h) Category 4 (130–156 mph, 209–251 km/h) Category 5 (≥157 mph, ≥252 km/h) Unknown Storm type Tropical cyclone Subtropical cyclone Extratropical cyclone, remnant low, tropical disturbance, or monsoon depression

A tropical wave emerged into the Atlantic Ocean from the coast of northwest Africa on September 23. No additional signs of tropical cyclogenesis were observed as the tropical wave crossed the Atlantic Ocean or the Caribbean Sea. The tropical wave decelerated upon reaching the Yucatán Peninsula, where it became a broad low pressure area, based on surface pressure fields and convective motions indicated in satellite imagery. While emerging into the Bay of Campeche on October 12, the intensity of the low was estimated via Dvorak technique. At 1900 UTC on October 12, a reconnaissance aircraft flight confirmed an atmospheric circulation, and the system was then classified as Tropical Depression Fourteen. However, post-analysis indicates that the depression developed seven hours earlier, while located about 230 miles (370 km) east-northeast of Veracruz, Veracruz.

While moving north-northwestward, satellite and reconnaissance aircraft reports indicated the depression strengthened into Tropical Storm Jerry early on October 13. Jerry then gradually intensified and moved northward between 5 and 10 mph (8.0 and 16.1 km/h). Early on October 14, the storm turned to the north-northeast and decelerated in response to an approaching mid- to upper-level trough. Increasing upper-level wind shear temporarily limited further intensification. However, after a mid- to upper-level cut-off low pressure area moved southward, the upper-level outflow pattern became more favorable, causing Jerry to resume strengthening. The cut-off low then forced Jerry to re-curve north-northwestward, while stronger steering currents and a high pressure ridge increased the storm's forward motion to more than 10 mph (16 km/h). While approaching the Gulf Coast of the United States, deep convection began to develop near the center, and by 1800 UTC on October 15, Jerry strengthened into a Category 1 hurricane.

After reaching hurricane status late on October 15, the storm continued to intensify while approaching the coast of Texas. At 2100 UTC, Jerry attained its minimum barometric pressure of 982 mbar (29.0 inHg). The storm strengthened slightly further before making landfall on Galveston Island near Jamaica Beach, Texas with winds of 85 mph (137 km/h) at 0030 UTC on October 16. Jerry's landfall is among the latest dates in the satellite era that a hurricane struck the upper Texas coast. After moving inland, the storm then accelerated while turning toward the north and then north-northeastward. At 0600 UTC on October 16, Jerry weakened to a tropical storm and to a tropical depression about six hours later. Late on October 16, the cyclone was absorbed by a frontal system over southwestern Arkansas.

== Preparations ==
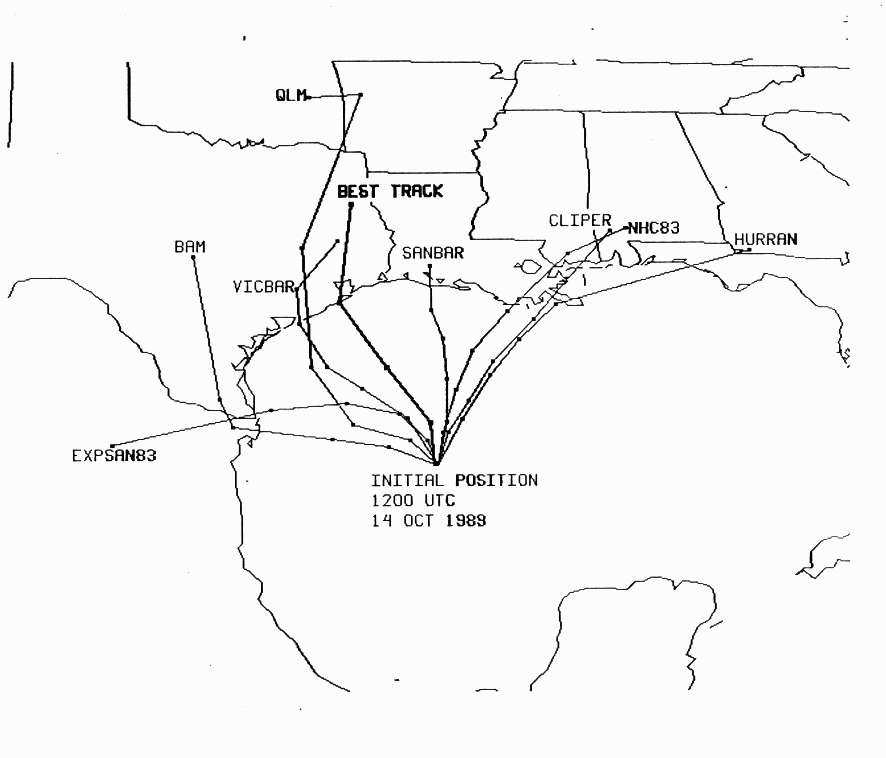
The forecast models of Jerry were never close to the hurricane's actual landfall

Jerry was an unpredictable storm as the strengthening before landfall and the continuation to the northwest were not anticipated. Equipment failure meant that data was not readily available. The National Hurricane Center forecast model was also disabled, throwing the accuracy of Jerry's track off. Tropical cyclone warnings and watches began early on October 14, with a hurricane watch for Port Arthur, Texas to the mouth of the Mississippi River in Louisiana. At 2200 UTC later that day, a tropical storm watch was issued for the entire coast of Louisiana. Another tropical storm watch was posted from Port O'Connor, Texas to Morgan City, Louisiana at 1200 UTC on October 15.

Due to the unpredictability of the storm, a hurricane warning was issued from Freeport, Texas to Intracoastal City, Louisiana at 1600 UTC, only eight hours prior to landfall. Simultaneously, two separate tropical storm warnings were posted, from Matagorda to Freeport and Intracoastal City to Morgan City. Although the storm had already made landfall, a tropical storm warning was issued from Freeport to Intracoastal City at 0400 UTC on October 16. By six hours later, all tropical cyclone warnings and watches were discontinued.

About 4,000 oil company employees were evacuated off the rigs in the Gulf of Mexico, at least 1,300 of them by helicopter. In Louisiana, approximately 8,000 people evacuated – 1,000 from Grand Isle and 7,000 others from Cameron Parish.

== Impact ==
=== Texas ===
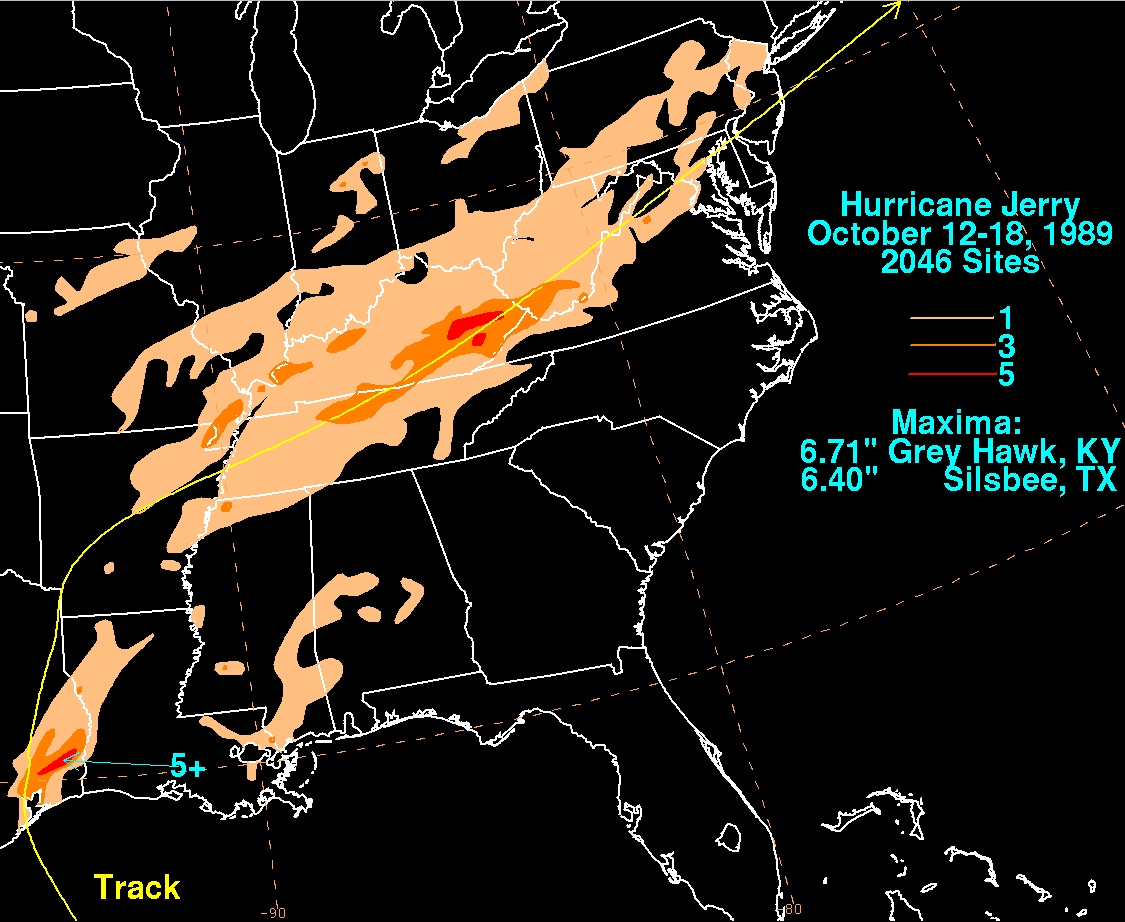
Rainfall totals from Hurricane Jerry

Rainfall from Hurricane Jerry peaked at 6.4 inches (160 mm) in Silsbee. Jerry caused light beach erosion along the Texas coast. The storm destroyed a 20 miles (32 km) section of Texas State Highway 87, between High Island and Sabine Pass. As of 2018, the destroyed section of the highway has not been repaired, despite plans for it to be rebuilt. In Galveston County, abnormally high astronomical tides and rough surf from Jerry resulted in coastal flood damage. Beach erosion was reported, while some sand dunes were flattened. On the western end of Galveston Island, beachfront roads were inundated and covered with debris, glass, and boards. In Brazoria County, high tides caused minor road damage in Surfside Beach. Storm surge in Chambers County caused coastal flooding in Anahuac. Three people were killed when their car was either blown or washed off the Galveston Seawall during the storm. The eye of the Hurricane went directly over Kemah where waterfront businesses suffered considerable damage, including restaurants, boat docks, and bait stands. Property losses in the city of Kemah was estimated to have reached $2 million. In the upper end of Galveston Bay in Harris County, businesses in low-lying areas were affected by coastal flooding.

At Scholes Field, sustained winds of 75 mph (121 km/h) and gusts up to 100 mph (160 km/h) were observed, ripping doors off the hangars. A walkway and four boats were damaged at the Hanks Creek Marina, located on the eastern shore of Sam Rayburn Reservoir, while the marina itself was deroofed. Similar impact was reported at the nearby Shirley Creek Marina. Strong winds destroyed four high steel towers, which supported power lines that traversed the northern Galveston Bay near the Houston Ship Channel. Elsewhere in eastern Texas, wind damage was relatively minor, mainly limited to shattered windows, toppled trees and power lines, and generally light impact to houses, mobile homes, buildings, farm buildings, and businesses in several counties in eastern Texas. Falling trees blocked numerous roads and struck houses and power lines, leaving approximately 52,000 homes and businesses without electricity, most of them in the Galveston area. There were three tornadoes in the county, the first of which unroofed some buildings in Galveston. The second tornado, also touching down in Galveston, inflicted roof damage to many businesses, homes, and apartment complexes. The third tornado, spawned in League City, toppled several trees and a flag pole. In Chambers County a tornado near Kemah inflicted damage to a beach house. Another tornado in the county spawned in downtown Baytown shattered windows at a hospital, a mall, and store windows. In Polk County, a small tornado caused minor damage, totaling $10,000.

=== Elsewhere ===
In Louisiana, tides ranging from 2 to 3 feet (0.61 to 0.91 m) above normal lashed the coast. However, coastal flooding damage was minimal. Gusty winds in the northwestern portion of the state downed some trees and power lines. Jerry and its remnants dropped rainfall in several other states, including Alabama, Arkansas, Illinois, Indiana, Kentucky, Maryland, Mississippi, Missouri, New Jersey, Ohio, Virginia, and West Virginia.

Similar rainfall was reported in Kentucky, ranging from 4 to 6 inches (100 to 150 mm). Flash flooding caused significant damage in several counties. Numerous roads and bridges were washed out. Hundreds of homes were damaged or destroyed, forcing hundreds to evacuate. Additionally, many cars were damaged or swept away. The Kentucky River overflowed at Hazard in Perry County, inundating a number of streets with up to 4 feet (1.2 m) of water. About ten families were forced to evacuate. Damage in Perry County exceeded $1 million. In neighboring Letcher County, 100 bridges and culverts were washed out, while about 50 homes were impacted by flooding. Damage in the county reached $2 million. In Floyd County, over 750 students and teachers were stranded at a school in McDowell after the Frasure Creek overflowed, inundating several classrooms with over 2 feet (0.61 m) of water. Over 200 homes were flooded and many bridges and roads washed in Pike County, with damage reaching $2 million. Many residents were left isolated in eastern Kentucky after flooding destroyed bridges and roads. According to state disaster assessment teams, hundreds of residents in eastern Kentucky and West Virginia had flood damage to their houses. Due to the impact from flooding in eastern Kentucky, President George H. W. Bush declared Clay, Floyd, Jackson, Knott, Knox, Leslie, Letcher, Magoffin, Owsley, Perry and Pike counties as disaster areas.

Heavy rains in West Virginia overflowed the Tug Fork and Guyandotte rivers. About 150 homes were evacuated in Matewan, where the Tug Fork River crested at 6 feet (1.8 m) above its banks. Farther south in Williamson, the river overflowed its banks by about 3 feet (0.91 m). On October 19, Governor of West Virginia Gaston Caperton toured flood-ravaged areas of the state, including Mingo and Logan counties. Heavy rainfall extended eastward into extreme western Virginia. In northern Buchanan County, flash flooding destroyed or heavily damaged numerous businesses and homes. Additionally, many private bridges were swept away and more than 100 roads were inundated. Approximately 30 families were evacuated in the Hurley area, where up to 5 inches (130 mm) of precipitation was observed. Damage in Buchanan County totaled $3.4 million. President Bush declared Buchanan County as a disaster area on November 8.

== See also ==
- Other storms of the same name
- Hurricane Bonnie (1986)
- Hurricane Chantal (1989)
- List of Texas hurricanes
