= Tropical Storm Jerry (1995) =

Atlantic tropical storm in 1995

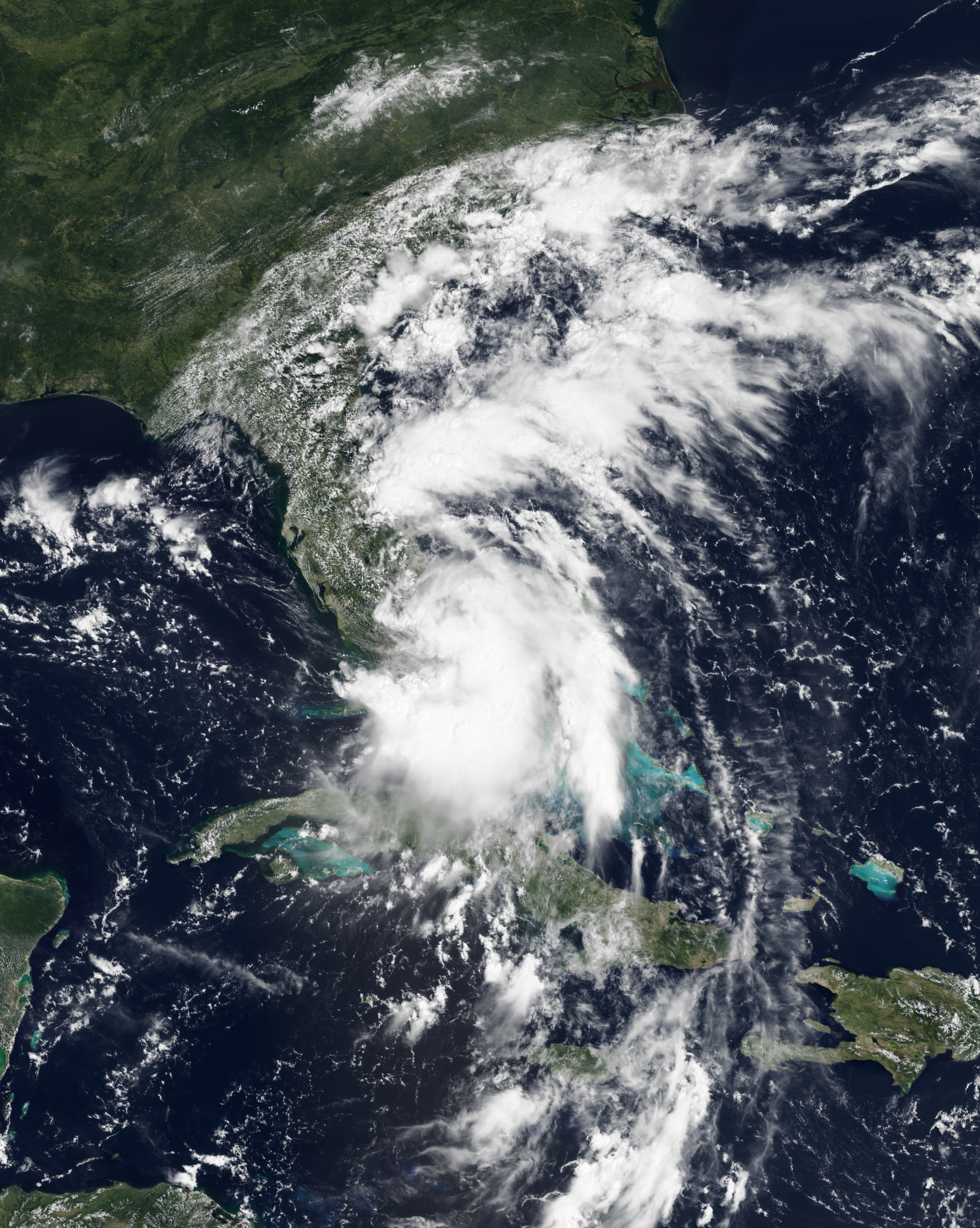
- Tropical Storm Jerry just east of the Florida Keys on August 23

Meteorological history
- Formed: August 22, 1995
- Dissipated: August 28, 1995

Tropical storm
- 1-minute sustained (SSHWS/NWS)
- Highest winds: 40 mph (65 km/h)
- Lowest pressure: 1002 mbar (hPa); 29.59 inHg

Overall effects
- Fatalities: 6 direct, 2 indirect
- Damage: $40 million (1995 USD)
- Areas affected: Florida, Georgia, South Carolina, North Carolina
- IBTrACS
- Part of the 1995 Atlantic hurricane season

Tropical Storm Jerry was a tropical storm that caused severe flooding throughout the southeast United States in August of the 1995 Atlantic hurricane season. Jerry, the tenth tropical storm of the season, formed from a tropical wave that moved off the African coast in early August, which organized into a tropical depression and tropical storm between the Bahamas and Florida later in the month, before striking Florida in the latter part of the month. Its remnant circulation persisted until five days after landfall. The rainfall it produced, amounting to over 12 inches (300 mm) in several locations across Florida, Georgia, and South Carolina, was responsible for $40 million (2005 USD) in damage and 6 deaths. Jerry was the first tropical cyclone to make landfall in South Florida since Hurricane Andrew in 1992.

== Meteorological history ==
Map plotting the storm's track and intensity, according to the Saffir–Simpson scale Map key Saffir–Simpson scale Tropical depression (≤38 mph, ≤62 km/h) Tropical storm (39–73 mph, 63–118 km/h) Category 1 (74–95 mph, 119–153 km/h) Category 2 (96–110 mph, 154–177 km/h) Category 3 (111–129 mph, 178–208 km/h) Category 4 (130–156 mph, 209–251 km/h) Category 5 (≥157 mph, ≥252 km/h) Unknown Storm type Tropical cyclone Subtropical cyclone Extratropical cyclone, remnant low, tropical disturbance, or monsoon depression

A tropical wave moved off the west coast of Africa on August 9. It moved westward across the Atlantic Ocean, and reached the Lesser Antilles on August 15. While passing through the islands, convection greatly increased, causing wind gusts of up to 45 miles per hour (72 km/h), though it remained disorganized. On August 22, convection organized while the system was over the western Bahamas, and it developed into Tropical Depression Eleven later that day. Conditions were only marginally favorable due to lack of outflow to its west, but the depression strengthened to reach tropical storm status on August 23.

Jerry, having reached tropical storm strength 33 miles (53 km) east of the coast of Florida, moved to the northwest and hit Jupiter later on August 23. It continued to the northwest across the state, and remained a tropical storm until late on August 24 when it entered the Gulf of Mexico over Citrus County. It remained over waters briefly until moving inland in Dixie County on August 25. It continued slowly northward, entering Georgia on August 26. The weak depression turned to the east, and dissipated into a trough of low pressure on August 28 near the Georgia/South Carolina border. The trough developed two circulation centers, one of which moved eastward while the other moved southward. The latter drifted southwestward across Florida until dissipating in early September. It is unknown if either of the circulations are directly related to the original center of Jerry.

== Preparations ==
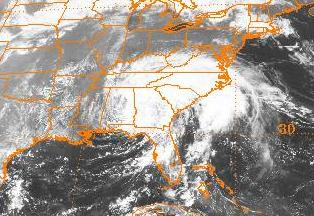
Jerry as a Tropical Depression over Georgia

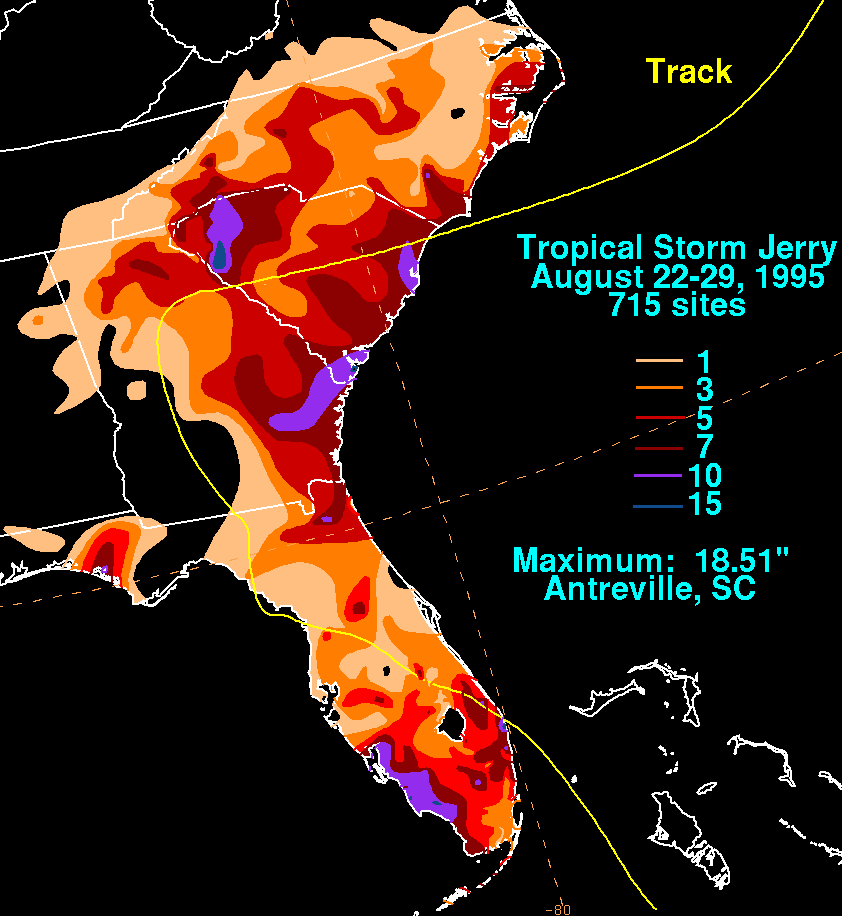
Rainfall totals from Jerry

Because much of the circulation was over land, Jerry was not predicted to intensify to a tropical storm. This caused tropical storm warnings not to be issued until just hours before landfall. While crossing over the state, the storm retained its strength, causing officials to issue Tropical Storm Warnings over the Florida Panhandle. However, Jerry remained a tropical depression over the Gulf of Mexico, and the warnings were dropped after Jerry's second landfall.

== Impact ==
=== Florida ===
Upon making landfall in southeastern and western Florida, Jerry caused a storm surge of 1 foot (0.30 m) to 2 feet (0.61 m) in most areas. Rainfall was generally moderate in the southeastern portion of the state, with the highest amounts of over 10 inches (250 mm) occurring in Palm Beach County. A larger area of higher totals was recorded in southwestern Florida, with rainfall peaking at 16.8 inches (430 mm) in Golden Gate. Winds were light, peaking at 43 miles per hour (69 km/h) at Patrick Air Force Base in Brevard County. The storm caused two weak tornadoes and one waterspout, though damage was minimal. In addition, Jerry caused light beach erosion.

While wind damage was minimal, the heavy flooding left many roads across the state under water. In addition, it damaged 340 houses and destroyed 12, most of which were in Collier County. In northwestern Florida, the flooding caused severe damage to the citrus crop, with total agricultural damage amounting to $15 million. In all, damage in Florida amounted to $19 million (1995 USD). The storm also caused two indirect deaths in the state, though no fatalities were directly attributed to Jerry.

=== Georgia ===
In Georgia, Jerry dropped severe rainfall of over 12 inches (300 mm) near Surrency, covering numerous waterways and flooding numerous houses. A state of emergency was declared within Georgia as Jerry moved through the state. Flooding from the storm across Georgia was mild to moderate due to the very dry conditions which preceded Jerry's arrival. In Savannah, 12.43 inches (316 mm) of rainfall was measured, which flooded the Ogeechee and Savannah Rivers.

=== South Carolina ===
Portions of South Carolina experienced significant rainfall totals of up to 19 inches (480 mm). The significant rainfall led to flooding along the Saluda, the Edisto, the Broad, and the Congaree Rivers in South Carolina. Dam breaks were also reported, which led to flooding which covered numerous roadways and washed out bridges, with the statewide transportation damage totaling $4.5 million (1995 USD). In addition, houses were flooded and fields covered, which caused a damage total of $10 million (1995 USD). Jerry also killed 3 people in the state.

=== North Carolina ===
The remnants of Jerry caused heavy precipitation in North Carolina, amounting up to 10 inches (250 mm) in the southwest corner of the state. This led to flooding along the Neuse, the French Broad, the Warned, the Lynches, the Black, the Little Pee Dee, the Pee Dee, and the Waccomaw rivers. Across the state, numerous roads, including portions of Interstate 85, and houses were submerged. Flood stage records were set for McMullen and McAlpine Creeks, with McAlpine reaching a stage of 19.4 feet (5.9 m). In the Charlotte area, the flooding forced the evacuation of 63 people from a nursing home, as well as 200 people from a pair of apartment complexes. Mecklenburg County reported damages of $5 million (1995 USD). In Raleigh, over 140 buildings or houses were damaged or destroyed, resulting a damage total in the area of $6 million (1995 USD). In all, Jerry caused $11 million (1995 USD) in damage across the state and 3 fatalities. It washed out Perry Mill Pond's dam outside of Zebulon NC on SR 1001.

== See also ==
- Other storms of the same name
- Potential Tropical Cyclone Ten (2017) – Caused severe flooding in the same areas 22 years later
- Hurricane Irma (2017) – Destructive Category 5 hurricane that affected many of the same areas
- List of North Carolina hurricanes (1980–1999)
- List of wettest tropical cyclones in South Carolina
- Timeline of the 1995 Atlantic hurricane season
