= Conchou =

Settlement in Guadeloupe

Coordinates: 16°19′43″N 61°18′44″W

Conchou is a settlement in Guadeloupe, on the island of Grande-Terre. It is located to the east of Le Moule; Guillocheau, Laureal, Guenette, and Portland are to its south.
