= Le Moule =

- Commune
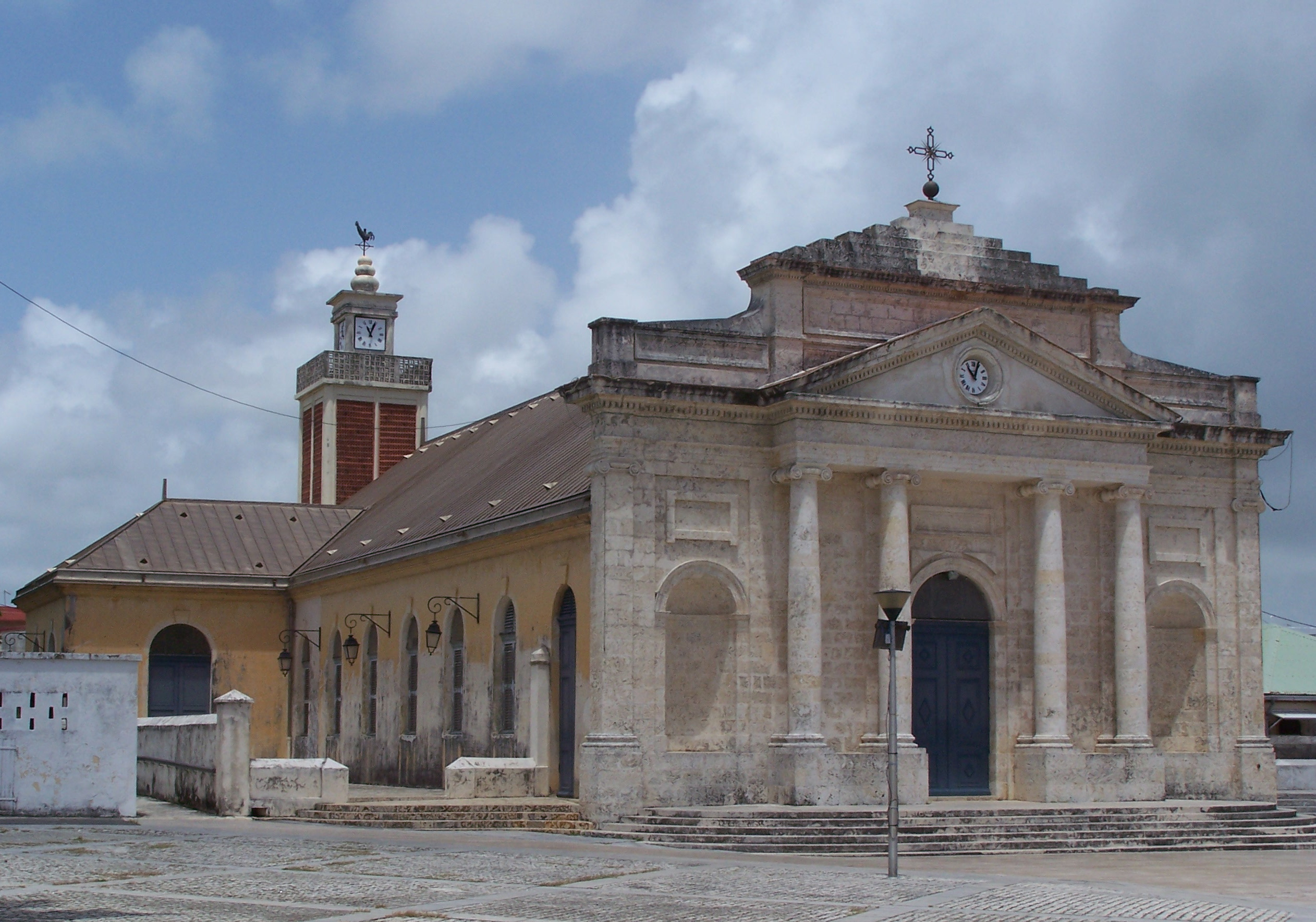
- The church of Saint-Jean-Baptiste, in Le Moule

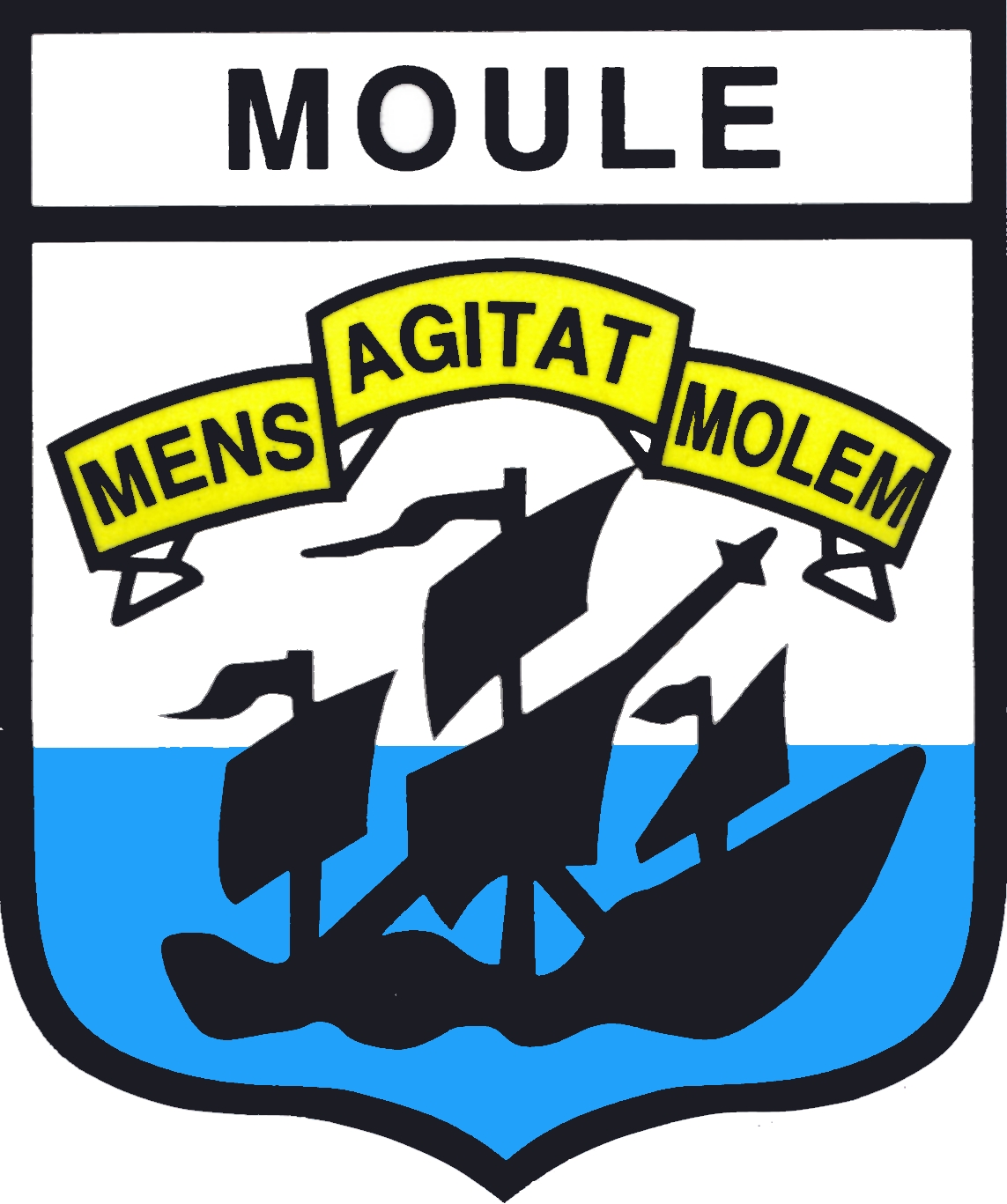
- Coat of arms

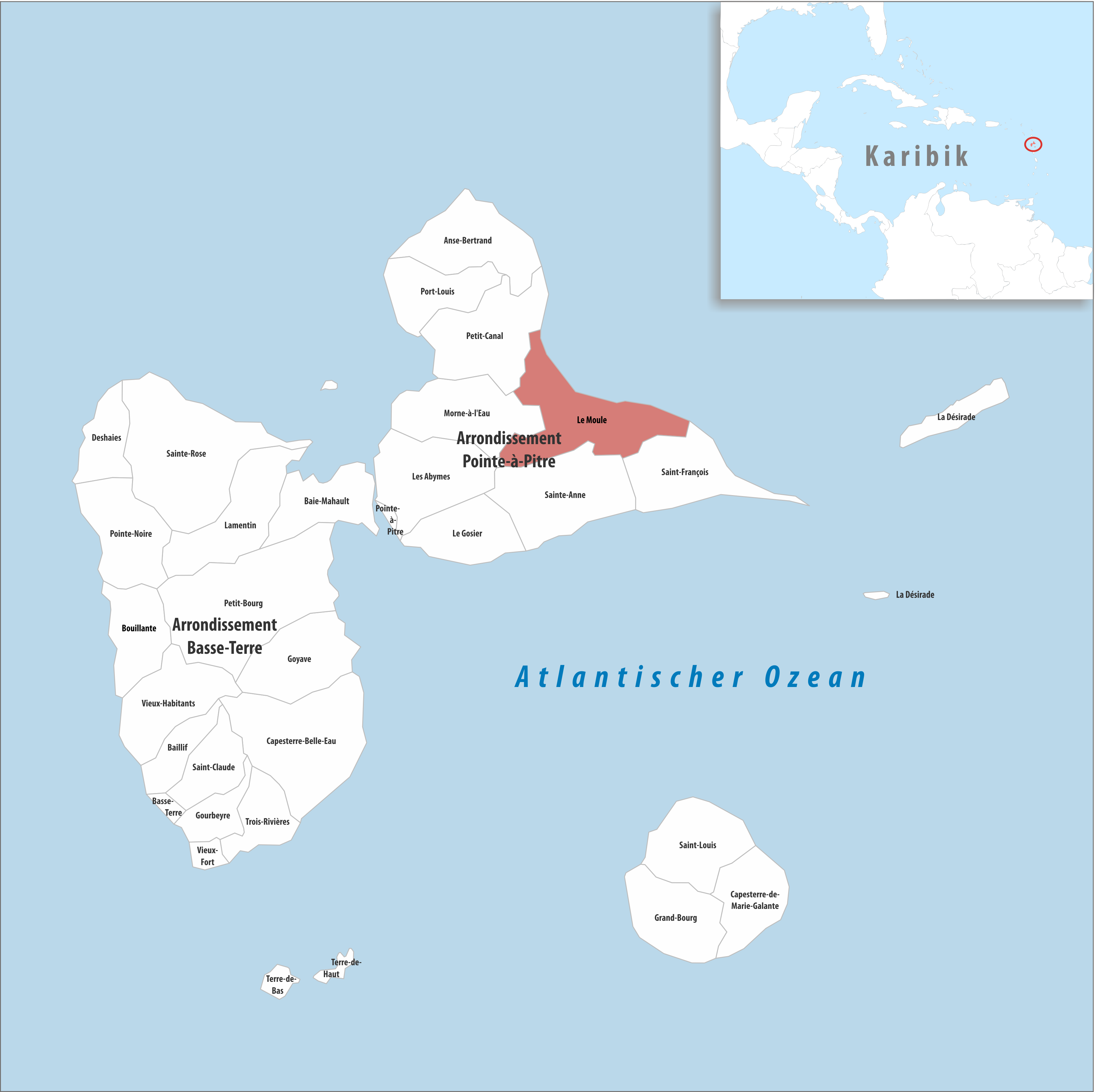
- Location of the commune (in red) within Guadeloupe
- Location of Le Moule
- Coordinates: 16°19′50″N 61°20′40″W
- Country: France
- Overseas region and department: Guadeloupe
- Arrondissement: Pointe-à-Pitre
- Canton: Le Moule
- Intercommunality: CA Nord Grande-Terre

Government
  - Mayor (2020–2026): Gabrielle Louis-Carabin
- Area^{1}: 82.84 km^{2} (31.98 sq mi)
- Population (2023): 23,014
  - Density: 277.8/km^{2} (719.5/sq mi)
- Time zone: UTC−04:00 (AST)
- INSEE/Postal code: 97117 /97160
- ^{1} French Land Register data, which excludes lakes, ponds, glaciers > 1 km^{2} (0.386 sq mi or 247 acres) and river estuaries.

Le Moule (French pronunciation: [lə mul]; Guadeloupean Creole: Moul) is the sixth-largest commune in the French overseas department of Guadeloupe. It is located on the northeast side of the island of Grande-Terre.

== History ==
From 1635, with the arrival of the French, and through the 17th century, the village was called Portland. The main part of the settlement stood on the present site of Autre Bord, to the east. During the 18th century the town became a stronghold of the colonial aristocracy and its centre moved to the left bank of the river Audoin, following the development of sugar cane and the search for a better position for the port on the Atlantic. Substantial construction work was carried out to protect and improve the town, including a breakwater (môle in French) that gave the town its new name, Le Moule. It became Guadeloupe's main commercial port.

Because of its direct trade links with France, the town was a target for the British fleet during the Napoleonic Wars at the beginning of the 19th century; a battle fought there in 1809 is remembered in Guadeloupe. On 20 September 1828, Le Moule was granted the right to export its goods to metropolitan France without passing through Pointe-à-Pitre.

In practice, all sugar cane, sugar and rum produced in Grande-Terre were shipped from Le Moule's port. The town's trade was further supplemented by shipments of coffee, cotton, fertilizer, coal, building material and spare parts.

During the first half of the 19th century, with its numerous refineries and plantations (at first about 30, then about 100), the planters farmed sugar cane, coffee, cotton, cocoa, spices and other food crops, and dominated the Guadeloupean economy during the 1850s. They subsequently suffered repeated financial collapses because of failed crops, the abolition of slavery, competition from European sugar production and the restrictive "colonial pact". Share farming and industrial modernisation followed, and steam engines replaced traditional windmills. By 1901, only four refineries survived: Duchassaing, Zévallos, Marly and Gardel. Le Moule's port lost its dominant position to Pointe-à-Pitre and the centre of commerce shifted away from the town.

The town was severely damaged by the cyclone of 1928. It was rebuilt under Mayor Charles Romana, with new schools, churches, roads and parks.

Gabrielle Louis-Carabin became mayor of Le Moule in 2002.

== Geography ==
Le Moule is on Grande-Terre, a limestone plateau. The town extends along the Atlantic coast, 51 km (32 mi) northeast of Pointe-à-Pitre. The settlements in the commune of Le Moule include Boisvin, Conchou, Gardel, Guenette, Laureal, Lemercier, Mahaudiere, Palais-Sainte-Marguerite, Portland, La Rosette, Sainte-Marguerite and Zevallos.

=== Climate ===
Le Moule has a tropical climate, with warm to hot daytime temperatures and cooler nights. Daytime temperatures generally range from about 27 °C (81 °F) to 29 °C (84 °F) between October and May, and from about 29 °C (84 °F) to 32 °C (90 °F) for the rest of the year. Heat and humidity are highest from July to October.

Climate data for Le Moule (Laureal, altitude 24m, 1991–2020 normals, extremes 1994–present)
Month	Jan	Feb	Mar	Apr	May	Jun	Jul	Aug	Sep	Oct	Nov	Dec	Year
Record high °C (°F)	31.0 (87.8)	31.5 (88.7)	31.7 (89.1)	32.2 (90.0)	32.8 (91.0)	33.0 (91.4)	32.9 (91.2)	34.0 (93.2)	33.4 (92.1)	33.2 (91.8)	32.1 (89.8)	31.5 (88.7)	34.0 (93.2)
Mean daily maximum °C (°F)	28.4 (83.1)	28.5 (83.3)	28.9 (84.0)	29.6 (85.3)	30.4 (86.7)	30.7 (87.3)	30.9 (87.6)	31.1 (88.0)	31.0 (87.8)	30.6 (87.1)	29.7 (85.5)	28.9 (84.0)	29.9 (85.8)
Daily mean °C (°F)	25.1 (77.2)	25.1 (77.2)	25.4 (77.7)	26.2 (79.2)	27.1 (80.8)	27.8 (82.0)	27.9 (82.2)	28.0 (82.4)	27.5 (81.5)	27.1 (80.8)	26.4 (79.5)	25.8 (78.4)	26.6 (79.9)
Mean daily minimum °C (°F)	21.8 (71.2)	21.7 (71.1)	21.9 (71.4)	22.8 (73.0)	23.8 (74.8)	24.8 (76.6)	25.0 (77.0)	24.8 (76.6)	24.0 (75.2)	23.6 (74.5)	23.1 (73.6)	22.6 (72.7)	23.3 (73.9)
Record low °C (°F)	15.5 (59.9)	14.9 (58.8)	16.2 (61.2)	17.1 (62.8)	19.3 (66.7)	19.6 (67.3)	21.3 (70.3)	21.1 (70.0)	21.1 (70.0)	19.7 (67.5)	17.5 (63.5)	17.7 (63.9)	14.9 (58.8)
Average precipitation mm (inches)	78.2 (3.08)	49.5 (1.95)	67.6 (2.66)	85.4 (3.36)	108.1 (4.26)	91.2 (3.59)	111.5 (4.39)	141.1 (5.56)	158.2 (6.23)	179.2 (7.06)	178.8 (7.04)	114.4 (4.50)	1,363.2 (53.67)
Average precipitation days (≥ 1.0 mm)	14.0	11.4	10.5	12.2	12.1	11.9	15.2	15.9	14.7	16.3	15.4	16.4	165.8
Source: Météo-France

Climate data for Le Moule (Gardel-Inra, altitude 30m, 1981–2010 normals, extremes 1991–2022)
Month	Jan	Feb	Mar	Apr	May	Jun	Jul	Aug	Sep	Oct	Nov	Dec	Year
Record high °C (°F)	31.1 (88.0)	31.8 (89.2)	32.2 (90.0)	32.8 (91.0)	33.4 (92.1)	33.3 (91.9)	32.8 (91.0)	33.7 (92.7)	34.0 (93.2)	33.8 (92.8)	32.7 (90.9)	32.3 (90.1)	34.0 (93.2)
Mean daily maximum °C (°F)	28.4 (83.1)	28.4 (83.1)	29.0 (84.2)	29.6 (85.3)	30.3 (86.5)	30.7 (87.3)	30.8 (87.4)	31.2 (88.2)	31.2 (88.2)	30.8 (87.4)	29.9 (85.8)	28.9 (84.0)	29.9 (85.8)
Daily mean °C (°F)	25.1 (77.2)	25.0 (77.0)	25.5 (77.9)	26.2 (79.2)	27.1 (80.8)	27.7 (81.9)	27.8 (82.0)	27.9 (82.2)	27.6 (81.7)	27.2 (81.0)	26.5 (79.7)	25.7 (78.3)	26.6 (79.9)
Mean daily minimum °C (°F)	21.9 (71.4)	21.6 (70.9)	22.0 (71.6)	22.8 (73.0)	23.8 (74.8)	24.7 (76.5)	24.8 (76.6)	24.7 (76.5)	24.0 (75.2)	23.6 (74.5)	23.1 (73.6)	22.5 (72.5)	23.3 (73.9)
Record low °C (°F)	15.9 (60.6)	15.6 (60.1)	16.4 (61.5)	17.1 (62.8)	19.7 (67.5)	20.6 (69.1)	21.6 (70.9)	21.0 (69.8)	20.9 (69.6)	20.0 (68.0)	17.3 (63.1)	15.7 (60.3)	15.6 (60.1)
Average precipitation mm (inches)	78.0 (3.07)	47.3 (1.86)	56.6 (2.23)	86.5 (3.41)	102.6 (4.04)	86.5 (3.41)	105.9 (4.17)	120.6 (4.75)	162.3 (6.39)	178.5 (7.03)	175.6 (6.91)	125.7 (4.95)	1,326.1 (52.21)
Average precipitation days (≥ 1.0 mm)	15.3	11.5	10.1	10.8	11.8	13.0	14.8	16.4	16.0	16.8	15.2	16.1	167.7
Source: Météo-France

== Population ==
Historical population
Year	Pop.	±% p.a.
1968	16,111	—
1975	16,705	+0.52%
1982	15,224	−1.32%
1990	18,054	+2.15%
1999	20,827	+1.60%
2007	21,318	+0.29%
2012	22,689	+1.25%
2017	22,150	−0.48%
2023	23,014	+0.64%
Source: INSEE

== Economy ==
Le Moule was a sugar port in the 17th and 18th centuries. Tourism has since grown, and there are seaside resorts on nearby beaches. Two distilleries operate in the area. Agriculture around Le Moule includes banana and sugarcane cultivation and livestock rearing.

== Education ==
Public preschools include:

- Ecole maternelle Debibakas Albert
- Ecole maternelle Laura Flessel
- Ecole maternelle Château Gaillard
- Ecole maternelle Soliveau Laure-Laurent
- Ecole maternelle Vitalle Laurette
- Ecole maternelle Dupuits Marie-Eva
- Ecole maternelle Sainte Marguerite

Public primary and elementary schools include:

- Ecole primaire Debibakas Albert
- Ecole primaire Adélaïde Amédée
- Ecole primaire Girard Aristide
- Ecole primaire Boisvin
- Ecole primaire Cocoyer
- Ecole primaire Grands-Fonds
- Ecole primaire Lacroix
- Ecole élémentaire Jean Galleron

Private primary schools include:

- Ecole primaire privée Externat Saint Joseph du Moule

Public junior high schools include:

- Collège Général de Gaulle
- Collège Guénette

Public senior high schools include:

- LP Louis Delgres

Private secondary schools under contract:

- Collège Saint-Dominique

== Sights ==
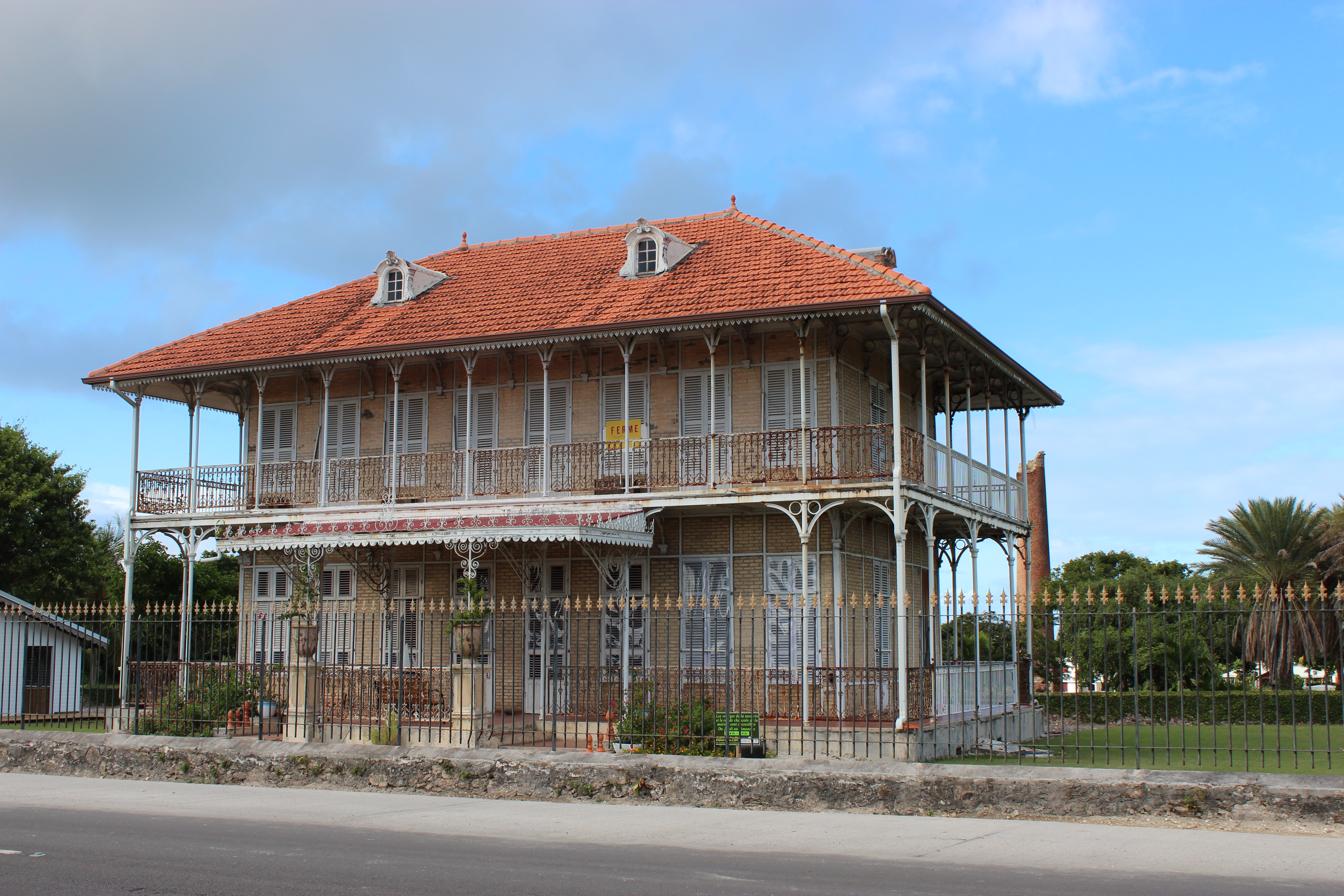
Zévallos Plantation

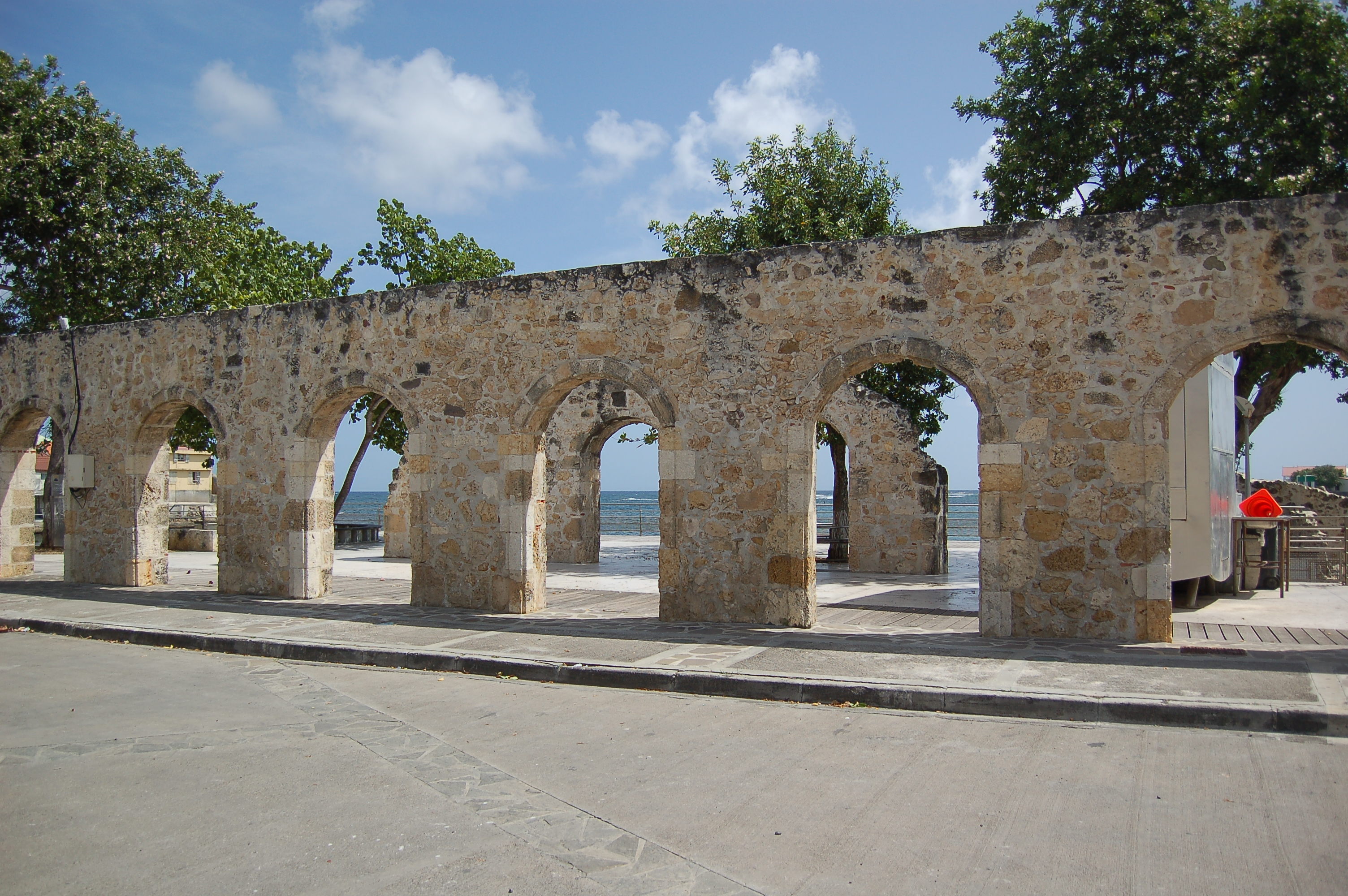
The old port

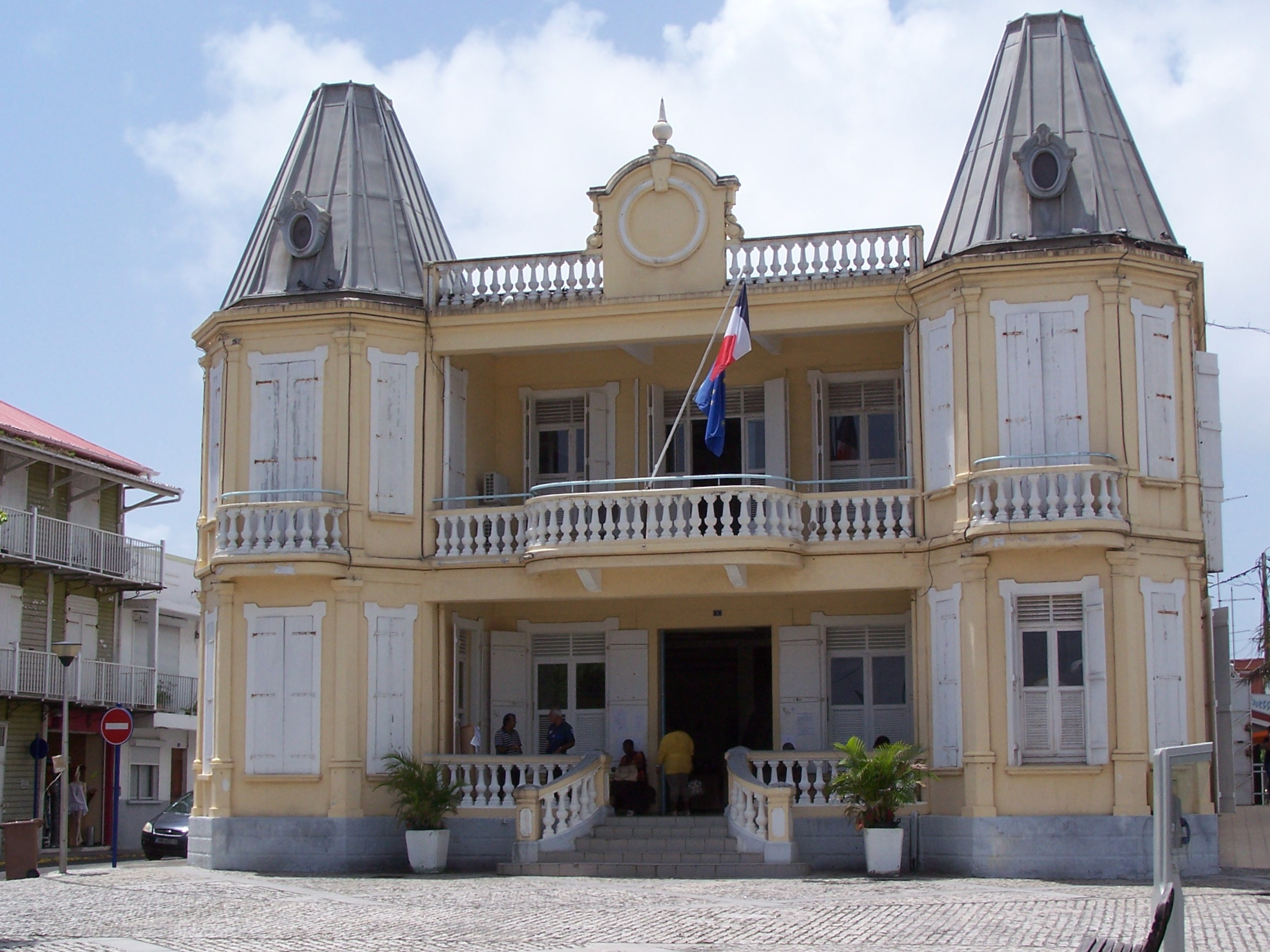
The Hôtel de Ville

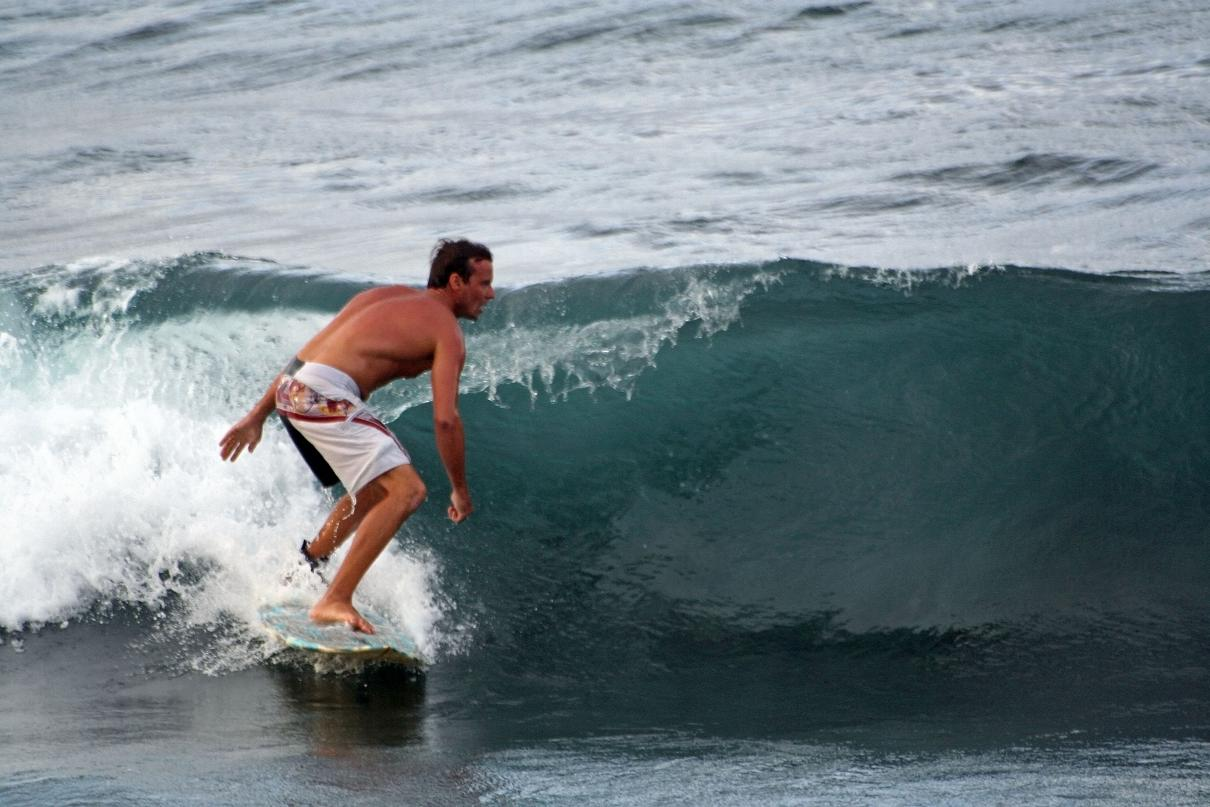
Le Moule surf spot

The Damoiseau Distillery is at Bellevue, in the middle of a sugar cane field. It produces white rum, aged rum and punches.

The Gardel plant was built in 1870 under a reconstruction plan for the agricultural sector. It is the only sugar refinery remaining on the main island of Guadeloupe, and its position among the sugar cane plantations allows heavy production from March to July.

The Ouatibi-Tibi Archaeological Park is at Morel, on 7 hectares of beach alongside the lagoon. It comprises three sites: a memorial centre, an archaeological centre and a recreation centre.

The Edgar Clerc Museum, west of the town, holds pre-Columbian and Amerindian collections. It presents the cultures of the Taíno, Carib and Arawak peoples through pottery and tools recovered from the excavations at the archaeological park at Morel.

The Hôtel de Ville was completed in 1927.

Windmills survive in sugarcane fields in the surrounding countryside. They were used to grind sugar cane before the introduction of steam engines. Some date from the 18th century and remain in good condition; a signposted route, the tour des moulins, links them.

The Church of Saint-Jean-Baptiste was built on a Latin cross plan in a neoclassical style. It has withstood numerous cyclones since its reconstruction in 1840, and retains a pastel-toned wooden interior.

Beaches in the commune include L'Autre Bord, shaded by sea grape trees on the approach to Le Moule, and Plage des Baies, about 1 km (0.62 mi) to the north, which forms a shallow bay.

== See also ==
- Communes of the Guadeloupe department
