= Pointe de la Grande Vigie =

Coordinates: 16°30′46″N 61°27′54″W

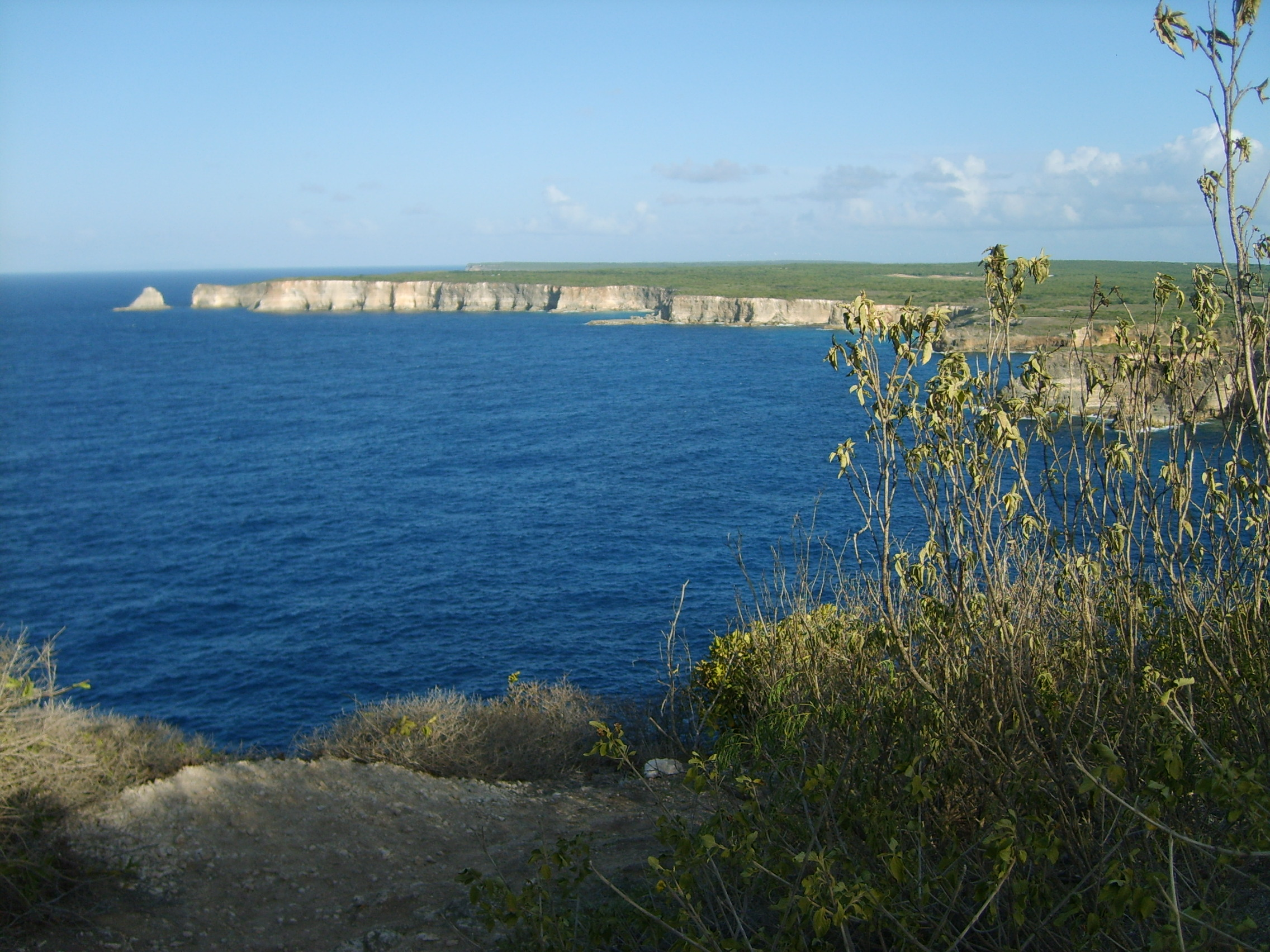
The cliffs at La Pointe de la Grande Vigie

The Pointe de la Grande Vigie is the northernmost point of the island of Grande-Terre in Guadeloupe and, as such, is also the northernmost point of Guadeloupe as a whole.

Located about 6 kilometres (3.7 mi) northeast of Anse-Bertrand (the commune it is administratively attached to), this rocky peninsula with vertical limestone cliffs reaching up to 80 metres (260 ft) high is reminiscent of the French coasts of eastern Normandy and Brittany. Exposed to trade winds and sea spray, it has scanty and xerophytic vegetation, and it has been the site of almost no construction. Its coastal escarpment makes access by sea difficult.

In clear weather, the Pointe de la Grande Vigie offers impressive views of Grande-Terre's lowlands to the south and of the islands of Montserrat, 80 kilometres to the northwest; Antigua, 70 kilometres to the north; and La Désirade, 50 kilometres to the southeast.
