= Port-Louis, Guadeloupe =

Port-Louis
- Commune
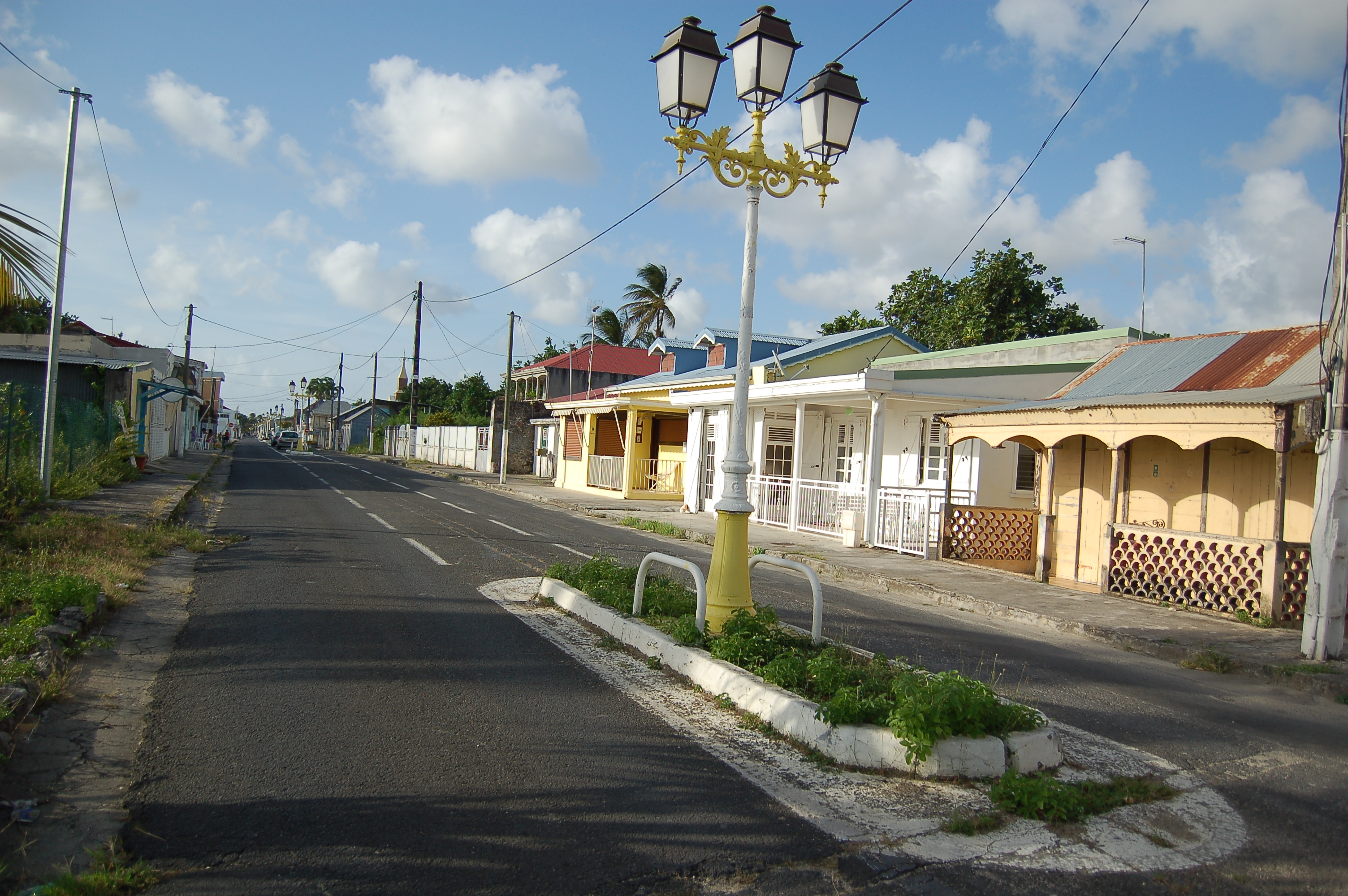
- A road in Port-Louis

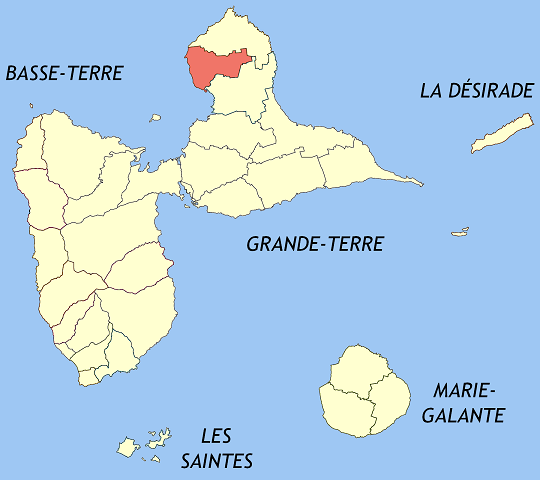
- Location of the commune (in red) within Guadeloupe
- Location of Port-Louis
- Coordinates: 16°25′00″N 61°32′00″W
- Country: France
- Overseas region and department: Guadeloupe
- Arrondissement: Pointe-à-Pitre
- Canton: Petit-Canal
- Intercommunality: CA Nord Grande-Terre

Government
  - Mayor (2020–2026): Jean-Marie Hubert
- Area^{1}: 44.24 km^{2} (17.08 sq mi)
- Population (2023): 5,607
  - Density: 126.7/km^{2} (328.3/sq mi)
- Time zone: UTC−04:00 (AST)
- INSEE/Postal code: 97122 /97117
- Port-Louis Lighthouse
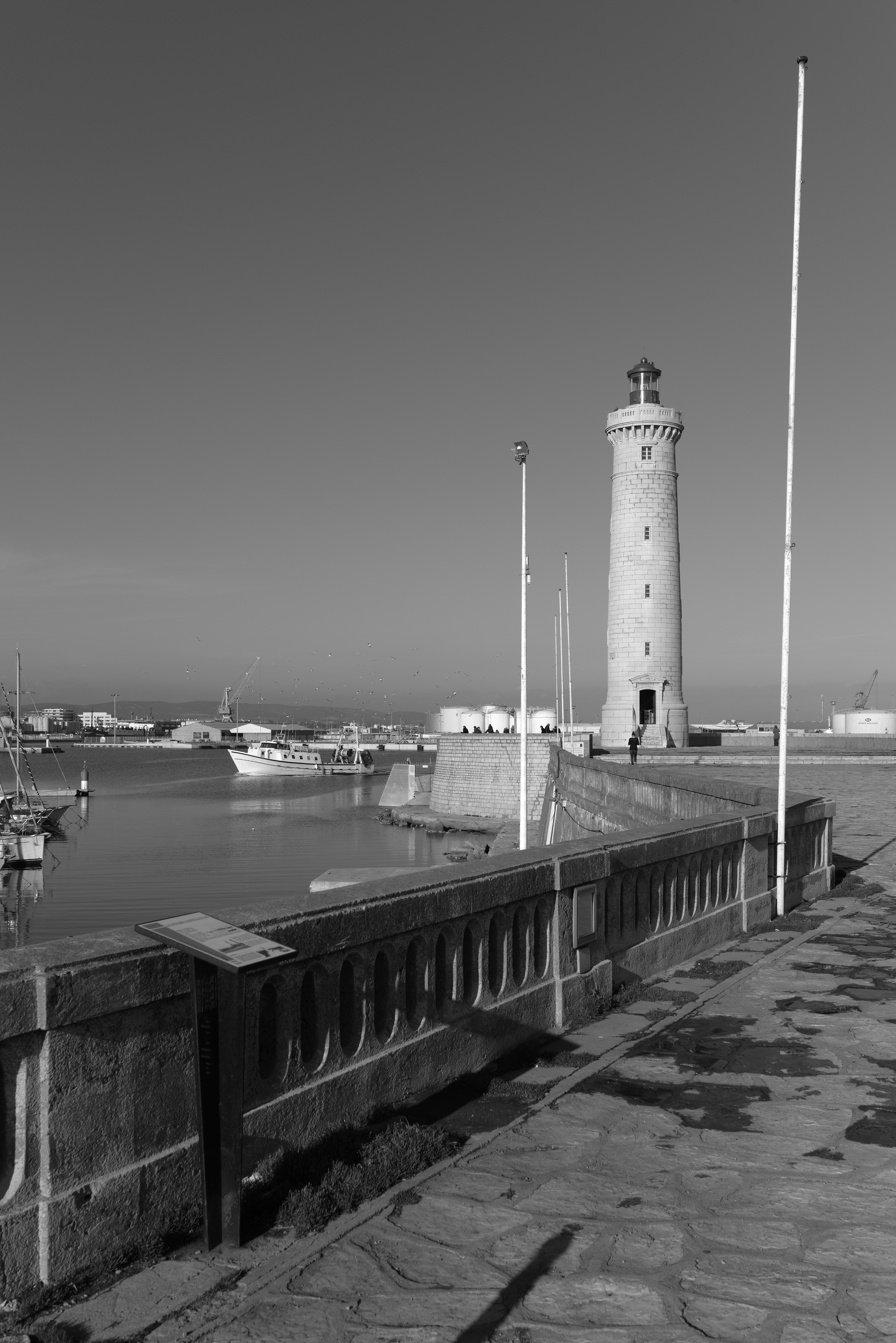
- Coordinates: 16°25′05.4″N 61°32′01.1″W
- Foundation: concrete base
- Construction: concrete skeletal tower
- Height: 10 metres (33 ft)
- Shape: square prism skeletal tower with closed lower part, balcony and light
- Markings: yellow torwe with black horizontal band
- Focal height: 10 metres (33 ft)
- Range: 11 nautical miles (20 km; 13 mi)
- Characteristic: Q (9) W 15s.
- ^{1} French Land Register data, which excludes lakes, ponds, glaciers > 1 km^{2} (0.386 sq mi or 247 acres) and river estuaries.

Port-Louis (French pronunciation: [pɔʁ lwi]; Guadeloupean Creole: Pòlwi) is a commune in the department of Guadeloupe, on the northwest of Grande-Terre.

== Geography ==
Port-Louis is situated in the north-west of Grande-Terre. Port-Louis is home to the Gaschet Lake which flows from the Gaschet ravine towards the Caribbean Sea. The climate is tropical.

The settlements in the commune of Port-Louis include Beauplan, Beauport, Beautiran, Bellevue, Belin, Belthier, l'Ermitage, Fauvette, La Goguette, Lallanne, Monroc, Pelletan, Philipsbourg, Pichon, Pierre-Ferraye, Paul-Aubin, Pouzzole, Rodrigue, Saint-Pierre, and Sylvain.

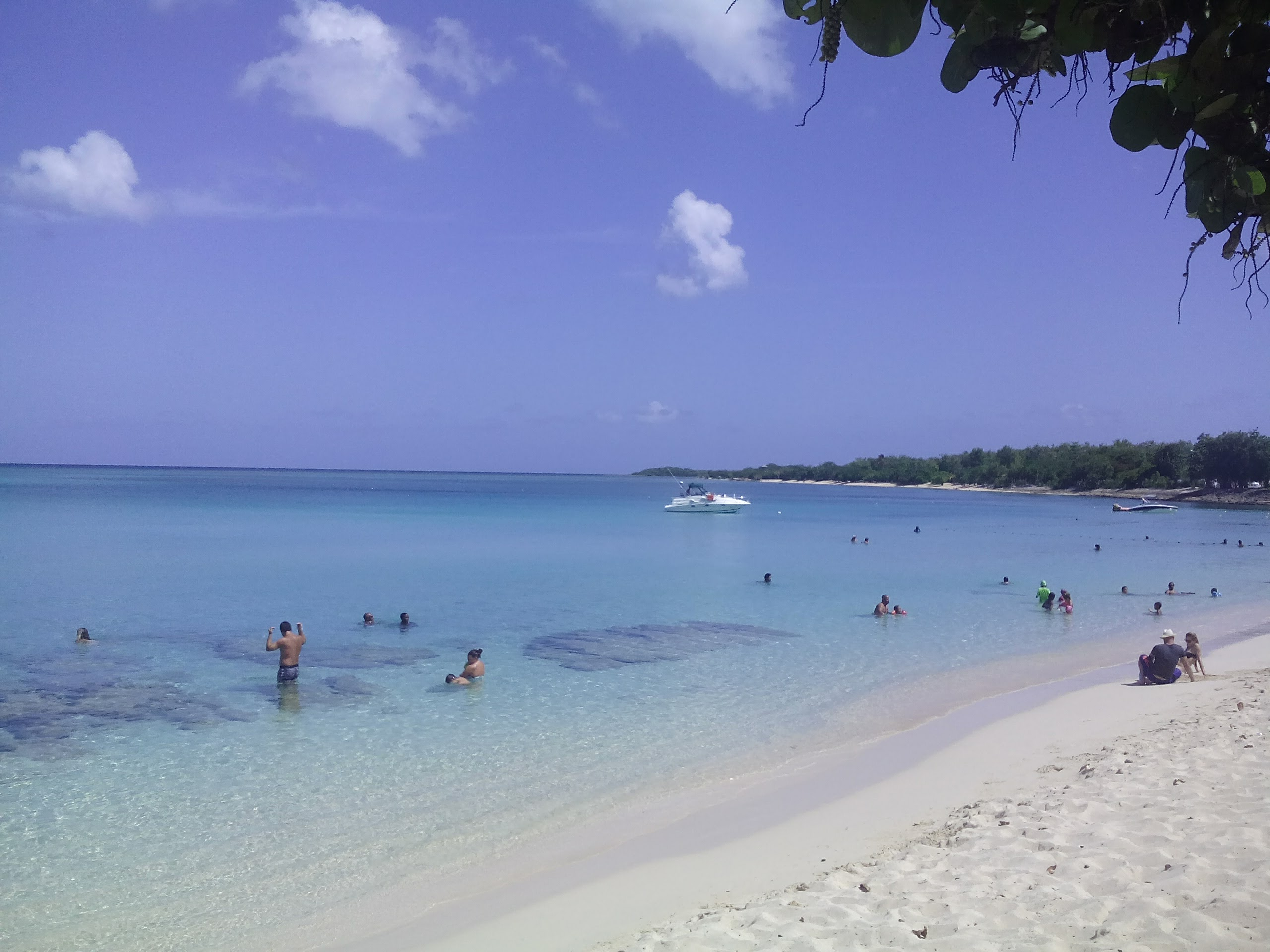
Port Louis beach (Guadeloupe)

== History ==
The settlement of northern Grande-Terre began in the mid-17th century. The city was first known as Pointe d'Antigues then Port Louis, bearing the name of the king of France Louis XIV. During the French Revolution it was renamed Port Libre (meaning free port) before returning to its current name in the 19th century.

At the beginning of the 18th century, the city was one of the first sugar ports of Guadeloupe. Gradually Port-louis was dethroned by Le Moule and Pointe-à-Pitre. In the 19th century, the Domaine de Beauport was one of the most important sugar factories in the French West Indies. It closed permanently in 1990. Nevertheless, sugar cane and fishing remain the main economic activities of the commune.

== Demography ==
Population censuses have been carried out in the commune since 1961 after Guadeloupe was made a French department in 1946. Since 2006, the population statistics have been published annually by the National Institute of Statistics and Economic Studies (Insee). For communes with less than 10,000 inhabitants, this population census takes place every five years, with the population figures for the intervening years being estimated. The first complete census study under this plan was completed in 2008.

Historical population
Year	Pop.	±% p.a.
1967	6,779	—
1974	6,968	+0.39%
1982	6,653	−0.58%
1990	5,641	−2.04%
1999	5,580	−0.12%
2007	5,466	−0.26%
2012	5,646	+0.65%
2017	5,704	+0.20%
2023	5,607	−0.29%
Source: INSEE

== Politics and administration ==
=== Administrative and electoral regions ===
The commune belongs to the district of Pointe-à-Pitre and to the municipality of Petit-Canal since the municipal rezoning of 2014. Before this, it belonged to the municipality of Anse-Bertrand.

Since 2014, Port-Louis has belonged to the urban conglomeration of North Grande-Terre, which is made up of 5 communes and has 58 267 habitants (based on 2016 statistics). Victor Arthein has been one of its vice-presidents since its creation.

For the election of members parliament, since 1988 Port-Louis has been part of the second electorate of Guadeloupe.

== Education ==
Public preschools and primary schools include:

- Ecole primaire Robert Narayanan
- Ecole primaire Beauplan Pelletan
- Ecole maternelle Bourg 2 Port-Louis
- Ecole maternelle Virginie Naudillon

Public junior high schools include:

- Collège Port-Louis

Public senior high schools include:

- LPO Nord Grande-Terre

== Notable people ==
- Mariani Maximin (1914–2011), politician

== See also ==
- Communes of the Guadeloupe department
- List of lighthouses in Guadeloupe
- Port-Louis, Mauritius
