= Grande-Terre, Guadeloupe =

Eastern half of Guadeloupe

Grande-Terre
- Map of places of interest in Grande-Terre, the eastern part of Guadeloupe island, a French island in the Antilles.

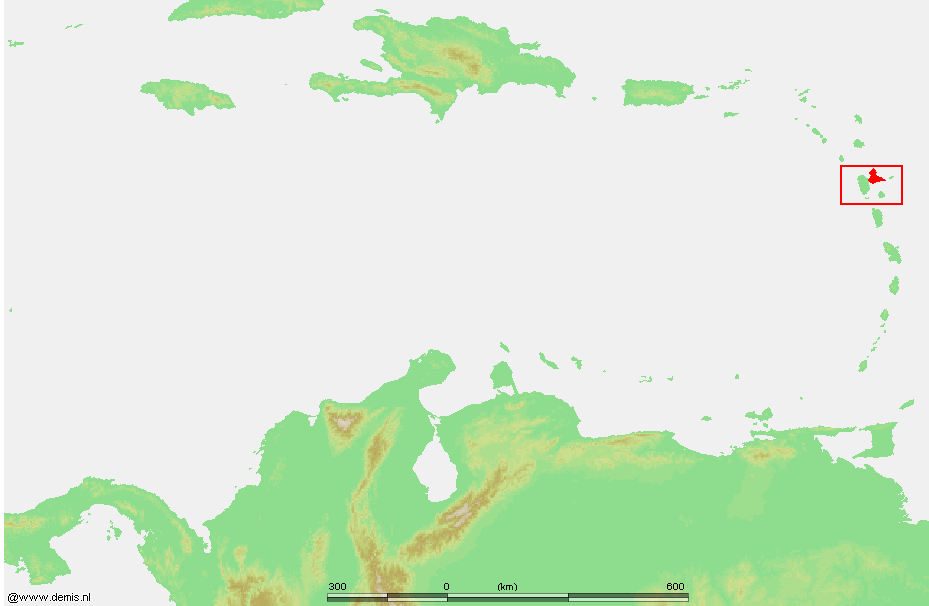

Geography
- Location: Caribbean Sea
- Coordinates: 16°19′03″N 61°25′43″W
- Archipelago: Leeward Islands
- Area: 586.68 km^{2} (226.52 sq mi)
- Highest elevation: 129 m (423 ft)
- Highest point: Morne l'Escade

Administration
- France
- Overseas department: Guadeloupe
- Largest settlement: Les Abymes (pop. 52,118)

Demographics
- Population: 197,603 (2006)
- Pop. density: 337/km^{2} (873/sq mi)
- Ethnic groups: Black / Mulatto 66%, White 9%, Indo-Guadeloupean 14%, Lebanese / Syrians 6%, Chinese / others 5%

Grande-Terre Island (French: île de Grande-Terre / île de la Grande-Terre [ɡʁɑ̃d tɛʁ]; Guadeloupean Creole: or Granntè) is the name of the eastern-half of Guadeloupe proper, in the Lesser Antilles. It is separated from the other half of Guadeloupe island, Basse-Terre, by a narrow sea channel called Rivière Salée (in English, Salt River). Pointe de la Grande Vigie, in Grande-Terre, is the northernmost point of Guadeloupe island. To the east lies La Désirade, and to the south lies Marie Galante.

== Name ==
Despite its name, Grande-Terre (literally "Large Land" in French) is smaller than Basse-Terre Island. It was given the name in contrast with the much smaller Petite Terre Islands ("Small Land" Islands), two very small islands located about 10 km south-east of the Grande-Terre (see map to the left).

== Geography ==
Grande-Terre's indented coastline is surrounded by coral reefs and the island itself is a limestone plateau. Its surface is a series of rolling hills, white sand beaches and cliffs. The island's beaches consist of both white and black sands, as well as beaches of golden sand. Of the two islands, Grande-Terre is home to the majority of Guadeloupe's farmlands and tourist resorts.

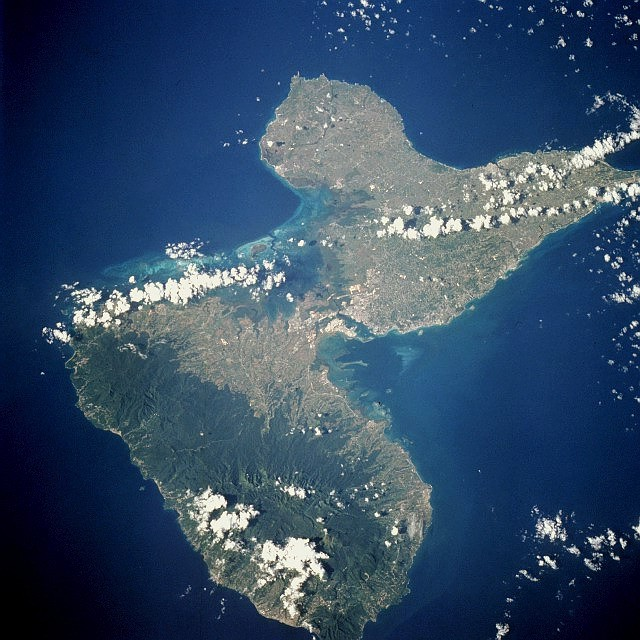
Grande-Terre Island (upper right) from space, September 1994. North is to the upper left in this view.

The island has a land area of 586.68 km^{2}.

== Population ==
At the 2006 census the population of Grande-Terre was 197,603 inhabitants living in 10 communes (municipalities). The population density was 337 inhabitants per km^{2} (872 inh. per sq. miles). The most populated communes are, in descending order of population, Les Abymes (part of the Pointe-à-Pitre urban area), Le Gosier (part of the Pointe-à-Pitre urban area), Pointe-à-Pitre (part of the Pointe-à-Pitre urban area), Le Moule, Sainte-Anne, and Morne-à-l'Eau.

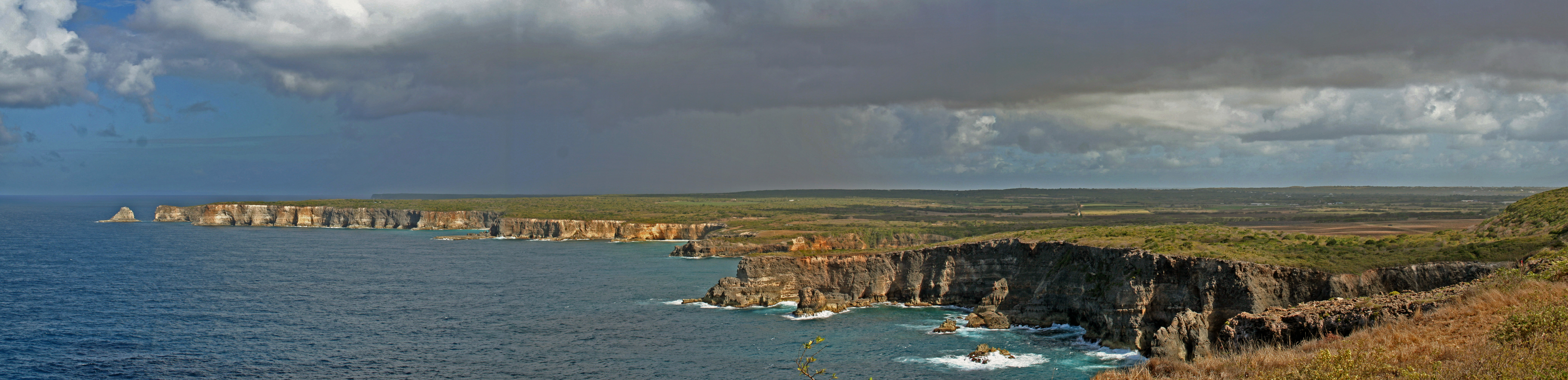
Panorama of la Pointe de la Grande Vigie in the north of Grande-Terre, Guadeloupe.

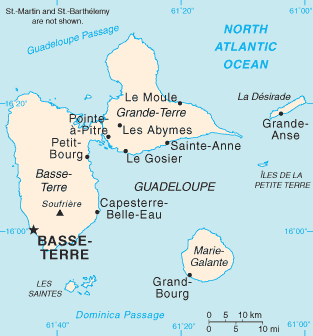
Petite Terre Islands appear about 10 km (6.2 mi) to the south-east of the island of Grande-Terre. Grande-Terre was so named in contrast with these two small islands.

== History ==
Historically, Grande-Terre Island was called "cibuqueira", ("Gum tree island", in the Caribbean language) and the island of Basse-Terre, "Caloucaera" (Karukera), a word meaning "the island of beautiful waters" in the Caribbean language.
