= Lucie Julia =

Guadeloupean writer (1927–2023)

- Born: Julia Lucie Manette. 16 February 1927; Morne-à-l'Eau, Guadeloupe, France
- Died: 23 September 2023 (aged 96); Sainte-Anne, Guadeloupe, France
- Other name: Huguette Daninthe
- Occupations: Social worker, women's rights activist and writer
- Years active: 1952–2023

Lucie Julia is the pen name of Huguette Daninthe (1927 – 23 September 2023) who was a Guadeloupean writer, women's rights activist, and social worker. Julia wrote in both Creole and French and was the recipient of the L'Hibiscus d'Or prize from the Institute Jeux Foraux de la Guadeloupe for poetry, as well as the Prix littéraire des Caraïbes for her novel Mélody des faubourgs. She was the first caseworker in Guadeloupe's Health Department, and for many years was one of the few trained social workers on the island.

== Early life ==
Huguette Manette was born on 16 February 1927 in Morne-à-l'Eau, on Grande-Terre Island, in the French overseas department of Guadeloupe. Her parents were descended from African slaves brought to the island to work on sugarcane plantations. Manette was one of seven children born to a World War I veteran who became a farmer and his wife who sold prepared foods and raised her children. As a child, Manette would leave her village of Espérance and take food to the cane cutters working in the countryside. She attended a paid primary school for two years and then at age 7 transferred to the Communale School, where for the first time in her life, she was exposed to French. She was a good student and saw her education as a means to obtain better employment.

Around the age of 9 or 10, Manette began to write poetry, encouraged by her neighbor, Jeanne de Kermadec, a poet who taught her poetic rhythm. She also studied the songs and rhythms of traditional Guadeloupean music and dances, like the gwoka, created with hand drums and often performed at rural musical performances, known as swarés léwoz. Some of her early works were published in the Guadeloupean newspapers. After completing her education in Guadeloupe, she went abroad and studied nursing and social work in France.

== Career ==
Though a department of France, the social welfare programs afforded to citizens living in France were not considered applicable to the overseas territories until 1948. Labor strikes and interventions by politicians, like Gerty Archimède and Rosan Girard, were responsible for the French Parliament recognizing and establishing a Social Security Board in 1949. Returning to Guadeloupe and settling in Pointe-à-Pitre, Manette was hired by the Department of Health in 1952 as the first caseworker to hold a degree. Having been recruited to organize and innovate the social welfare programs of the government, her changes were resisted by her colleagues and for the first five years, she was the only social service professional engaged by the system. But, slowly, she set up community health centers that provided services such as vaccinations, maternity care, and public health facilities throughout the islands of Guadeloupe.

Manette married Guy Daninthe, a lawyer, who became secretary general of the Guadeloupean Communist Party and co-founder of the General Confederation of Labour of Guadeloupe trade union movement. The couple had two sons, Guy-Marie and Ernest, who they raised in Pointe-à-Pitre, but from the early 1960s went every weekend to work the land that they purchased in Barbotteau-Vernou in the commune of Petit-Bourg on the island of Basse-Terre. In 1958, she became the first president of the Union des Femmes Guadeloupéennes (Union of Guadeloupean Women) and was a staunch advocate for women's equality and empowerment, as well as their socio-economic development and ability to protect their families and children.

When Daninthe turned forty, she returned to writing, adopting the pen name Lucie Julia. Going through her notes, Julia worked on a book which she called De ce petit coin d'Espérance (Out of this little corner of Hope). When the book was later published, in 1982, the title was changed to Les gens de Bonne-Espérance (The People of Good Hope). She wrote Mélody des faubourgs (Melody of the Suburbs), while she was still living in Pointe-à-Pitre and observing the poor among whom she worked and lived. In the late 1960s, the family moved to Barbotteau-Vernou and she commuted to work until her retirement in 1987 from the Health Department. In 1988, Julia published a collection of poems Chants, sons et cris pour Karukéra and was recognized by the Institute Jeux Foraux de la Guadeloupe with the L’Hibiscus d’Or prize for the best poem written in Creole. The following year, Mélody des faubourgs was published and was awarded the 1990 Prix littéraire des Caraïbes by the Association of Writers of the French Language.

In 1992, Julia published Mon trésor à Mantidou: Tim tim - bwa sek!, a bilingual children's book written in Creole and French. The following year, she published a collection of short stories, Kaïbo: conte de bonne maman (Kaïbo: The good mother's tale) and in 1994, published a play Jean-Louis: Un nègre pièce d’Inde (Jean-Louis: A Negro "Indian coin"). Julia's works demonstrate her celebration and promotion of Guadeloupean cultural tradition and often her protagonists portray people engaged in the fight for social justice. In 1996, she wrote the biography of one of her heroines, Gerty Archimède: fleur et perle de Guadeloupe, the first Guadeloupean woman to serve in the Chamber of Deputies. In 2006, she published a second volume of poetry Au fil des ans (Over the Years) for which her friend and fellow writer, Maryse Condé wrote the preface. Having been asked for years what became of her character Mélody, in 2007, Julia published a sequel, Le Destin d'Aimely.

== Death ==
Julia died on 23 September 2023, at the age of 96.

== Selected works ==
- Julia, Lucie (1982). Les gens de Bonne-Espérance: roman (in French). Paris, France: Temps Actuels. ISBN 978-2-201-01595-3.
- Julia, Lucie (1988). Chants, sons et cris pour Karukéra: poèmes (in French). Paris, France: Les Éditions La Bruyère. OCLC 462002164.
- Julia, Lucie (1989). Mélody des faubourgs: roman (in French). Paris, France: Éditions l'Harmattan. ISBN 978-2-738-40261-5.
- Julia, Lucie (1992). Montrésor à Mantidou: Tim tim - bwa sek!. (in Antillean Creole and French). Paris, France: Éditions l'Harmattan. OCLC 634494366.
- Julia, Lucie; Gervelas-Muth, Uta (Illustrator) (1993). Kaïbo: conte de bonne maman (in French). Pointe-à-Pitre, Guadeloupe: Éditions L.D. ISBN 978-2-950-76350-1.
- Julia, Lucie (1994). Jean-Louis: un nègre pièce d'inde (in French). Paris, France: Les Éditions de l'Amandier / Théâtre. ISBN 978-2-907-64908-7.
- Julia, Lucie (1996). Gerty Archimède: fleur et perle de Guadeloupe (in French). Pointe-à-Pitre, Guadeloupe: Éditions Jasor. ISBN 978-2-950-21957-2.
- Julia, Lucie (2006). Au fil des ans: poèmes et textes poétiques (in French). Paris, France: Les Éditions de l'Amandier. ISBN 978-2-915-69567-0.
- Julia, Lucie (2007). Le destin d'Aimely: roman (in French). Pointe-à-Pitre, Guadeloupe: Éditions Jasor. ISBN 978-2-912-59463-1.
