= Eugénie Éboué-Tell =

French politician (1891-1972)

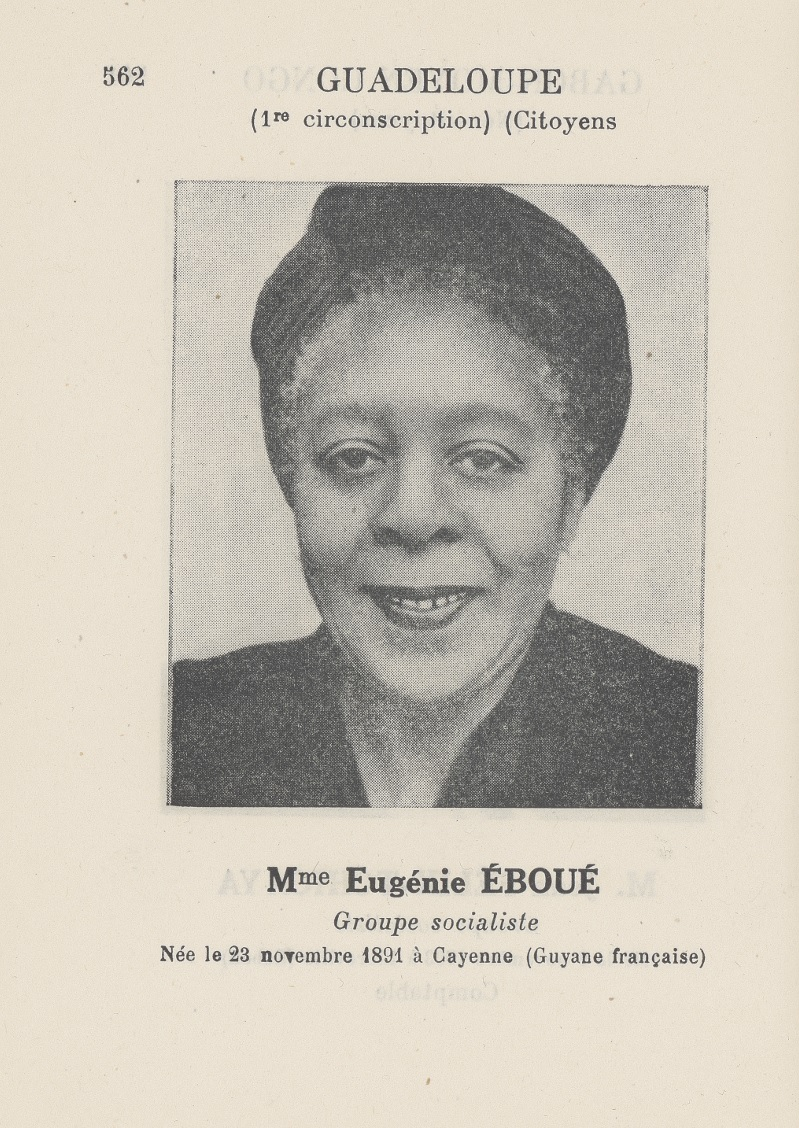
Eugénie Eboué, 1946

Eugenie Eboue-Tell (23 November 1891 in Cayenne, French Guiana – 20 November 1972 in Pontoise, France) was a politician from French Guiana who was elected to the French Senate in 1946 and reelected in 1948. She was the first black woman elected to the French National Assembly.

She was the widow of Félix Éboué.

== Biography ==
=== Origins, studies, resistance ===
She is the daughter of Hypollite Herménégilde Tell, director of the Cayenne penal colony. She completed part of her studies at the high school for young girls in Montauban (Tarn-et-Garonne) and obtained the certificate of pedagogical aptitude1. She returned to Guyana in 1911 and became a teacher, in Saint-Laurent-du-Maroni.

She married Félix Éboué on June 14, 1922, and in 1923 left to live with him in Oubangui-Chari, the current Central African Republic, where they remained until 1931. Thanks to her musical knowledge, she helped him to decipher the drummed and whistled language of the Banda and Mandja populations. The couple have four children (Henri, Robert, Ginette and Charles). She then follows her husband throughout his career, in Martinique (1932-1934) in Sudan (1934-1936), in Guadeloupe (1936-1938) then in Chad, where he was appointed governor in 1938 by the Colonial Minister Georges Mandel. After hearing the appeal of June 18, Félix Éboué rallied to General de Gaulle on August 26, 1940, against the decision of his superior, Pierre Boisson, Governor General of French Equatorial Africa. Free France then appointed him to replace the latter, as of November 12, 1942. For her part, Eugenie Tell enlisted in the Free French Forces for Women and became a nurse at the military hospital in Brazzaville; for this, in 1944 she obtained the Croix de Guerre and the médaille de la Résistance française. In 1940, however, his involvement in the Resistance earned him a death sentence in absentia, pronounced by the Vichy government.

Félix Éboué died on May 17, 1944, in Cairo (Egypt).

=== Political career ===
==== Deputy ====
She joined the SFIO in 1944. She was appointed delegate to the Provisional Consultative Assembly then became a member of Guadeloupe for the two National Constituent Assemblies between 1945 and 1946. She was thus among the first women MPs in French history. During the legislative elections of 1945, she was elected in the first constituency of Guadeloupe against the communist candidate Rosan Girard, by 14,441 votes out of 25,020, then re-elected against Gerty Archimède of the Communist Party in those of June 1946, by 12,490 out of 18 8151. She nevertheless failed to be re-elected within the 1st legislature of the Fourth French Republic, during the legislative elections of November 19461: she was third on a list of which only the first.

==== Councilor of the Republic and Senator ====
In May 1945 she was elected municipal councilor of Grand-Bourg (Guadeloupe). During the senatorial elections of 1946, on December 15, she was elected councilor of the Republic (which is equivalent, under the Third and Fifth Republics, and, from 1948, under the IV, to the mandate of senator), by twenty votes against thirty. Clovis Renaison, second on the SFIO list, is also elected. She is a member of the Socialist parliamentary group; she is part of the National Education Commission and the Interior Commission.

Its first action is to approve the motion "inviting the Council of the Republic not to rule on the request for the lifting of parliamentary immunity of Malagasy elected officials before having heard the parties concerned (May 1947)". She spoke publicly for the first time in July 1947, during a speech about Madagascar. It supports the transfer of the ashes of Victor Schœlcher to the Panthéon.

In 1947, she joined the RPF, a party recently founded by General de Gaulle. She was re-elected under this label in the municipal elections of October 1947. At the Council of the Republic, she then joined the parliamentary group "Democratic and Republican Action". She was re-elected Councilor of the Republic in the 1948 senatorial elections, which then took the name "Senate", making Eugénie Éboué-Tell and her sisters of the Luxembourg Palace "senators". She led the RPF list, which fills the two senator's seats; She won it by 231 votes out of 5,831. She became a member of the Customs Commission but mainly intervenes in public sessions on issues related to overseas territories. She was Vice-President of the Commission de la France d'Outre-Mer from January 19511. Her term ended in 1952 (she had not yet represented).

==== Other commitments ====
From February 21 to March 13, 1946, she represented France at the Conference of the West Indies which was held in Saint-Thomas (Virgin Islands of the United States). Nearly ten countries and thirty international and regional organizations and institutions are participating in the presence of Charles W. Taussig, special advisor to the US Secretary of State for Foreign Affairs. A member of the MRP's management board, General de Gaulle entrusted him with the presidency of the UPANG (Private Union for aid to General de Gaulle's action), in charge of collecting funds for the RPF. From 23 to 25 November 1951 she participated in Nancy in the National Assizes on the French Union and presented the report of the commission on the future of this organization, then becoming the vice-president of its assembly and the vice-president of the parliamentary group of "Social Republicans". She is also a member of the Steering Committee of the International Alliance of Women. She failed to be elected during the French legislative elections of 1956, then a candidate in the 5th district of the Seine; she was third on the list of Social Republicans, only one seat being filled by this list. From 1959 to 1962, she was a member of the social activities section of the Economic and Social Council. In 1958, she was elected municipal councilor of Asnières, under the mandate of Maurice Bokanowsky; she remains so until her death.

Sick, she died on November 20, 1972, in Pontoise and was buried in the cemetery of Pantin (the 21st division). Many attempts have so far remained unsuccessful for her to rest with her husband in the Pantheon.

== Decorations ==
- Croix de Guerre
- Medal of the Resistance
- Commander of the Legion of Honor
- Academic Palms Officer
- Order of Chad
- Order of the Ivory Coast

== Tributes ==
- Collège Eugénie-Tell-Eboué in Saint-Laurent-du-Maroni (French Guiana)
- Eugénie-Éboué Street (12th arrondissement of Paris)
