= Benmalek =

Benmalek is a surname. Notable people with the surname include:

- Anouar Benmalek (born 1956), Algerian novelist, journalist, mathematician, and poet
- Boualem Benmalek (born 1989), Algerian footballer
