= Monnerville (surname) =

Monnerville is a surname. Notable people with the surname include:

- Gaston Monnerville (1897–1991), French politician and lawyer
- Jean-Marc Monnerville (born 1959), birth name of French musician Kali
- Pierre Monnerville (1895–1970), French politician
