= Prix littéraire des Caraïbes =

French literary award

The Prix littéraire des Caraïbes (Caribbean Literary Prize) is a French literary award which was created in 1964 by l’Association des Écrivains de langue française (Association of French language writers). The award honors a writer from one of the French Caribbean islands (Haiti, Martinique, Guadeloupe, French Guiana) for an imaginative and elegant prose. The Prize is given every two years during a ceremony held at the French Senate, in Paris.

== The Prize winners ==
Prize winners
Year	Recipient	Title	Country	Publishers
1965	Jean Price-Mars	All his works	Haiti	
1967	Raphaël Tardon	All his works	Martinique	Note: After his death
1969	Léon Damas	All his works	French Guiana	
1971	Marie-Magdeleine Carbet	Rose de ta grâce	Martinique	Le cerf-volant
1973	Jean Fouchard	Les marrons de la liberté	Haiti	Deschamps
1975	Jean-Louis Baghio'o	Le flamboyant à fleurs bleues	Guadeloupe	Calmann-Levy
1977	Liliane Devieux-Dehoux; Alice Hyppolite	L'amour oui. La mort non and Ninon ma soeur	Haiti	Deschamps and Naaman
1979	Xavier Orville	Délice et fromager	Martinique	Grasset
1981	Bertin Juminer	Les héritiers de la presqu'île	French Guiana	Présence africaine
1983	Alain Rapon	La présence de l'absent	Martinique	Présence Africaine
1985	Roland Brival	Les tambours de Gao	Martinique	J-C Lattès
1987	Daniel Maximin	Soufrières	Guadeloupe	Seuil
1989	Raphaël Confiant	Le nègre et l'amiral	Martinique	Grasset
1990	Lucie Julia	Mélody des faubourgs	Guadeloupe	Éditions l'Harmattan
1991	Micheline Hermine	Les iguanes du temps	French Guiana	Ed. Caribéennes
1993	Ernest Pépin	Homme au bâton	Guadeloupe	Gallimard
1995	Nelly Schmidt	Victor Schoelcher et l'abolition de l'esclavage	Martinique	Fayard
1997	Marie-Reine de Jaham	L'or des îles	Martinique	Laffont
1999	Mona Guérin	Mi-figue mi-raisin	Haiti	l'Harmattan
2001	Oruno D Lara	La naissance du Panafricanisme	Martinique	Maisonneuve & Larose
2003	Josaphat-Robert Large	Les terres entourées de larmes	Haiti	l'Harmattan
2005	Keed J. Kendall	De la rivière à la scène	Martinique	l'Harmattan
2007	Gary Victor	Les cloches de la Brésilienne	Haiti	Vent d'ailleurs
2009	Emmelie Prophète	Testament des Solitudes	Haiti	Mémoire d'Encrier
2009	Axel May	Guyane française, l'or de la honte	French Guiana	Calmann-Lévy
2011	Emmanuel Goujon	L’Imperméable	Martinique	Editions Vents dʼailleurs
2013	Yanick Lahens	Guillaume et Nathalie	Haiti	Editions Sabine Wespieser
2015	Makenzy Orcel	L’Ombre animale	Haiti	Editions Zulma
2017	James Noël	Belle merveille	Haiti	Editions Zulma
2017	Simone Schwarz Bart	All his works	Guadeloupe	

== Sources ==
- The French section of Wikipedia for Prix littéraire des Caraïbes and Le Grand Prix de l'Afrique noire.
