= Gisèle Pineau =

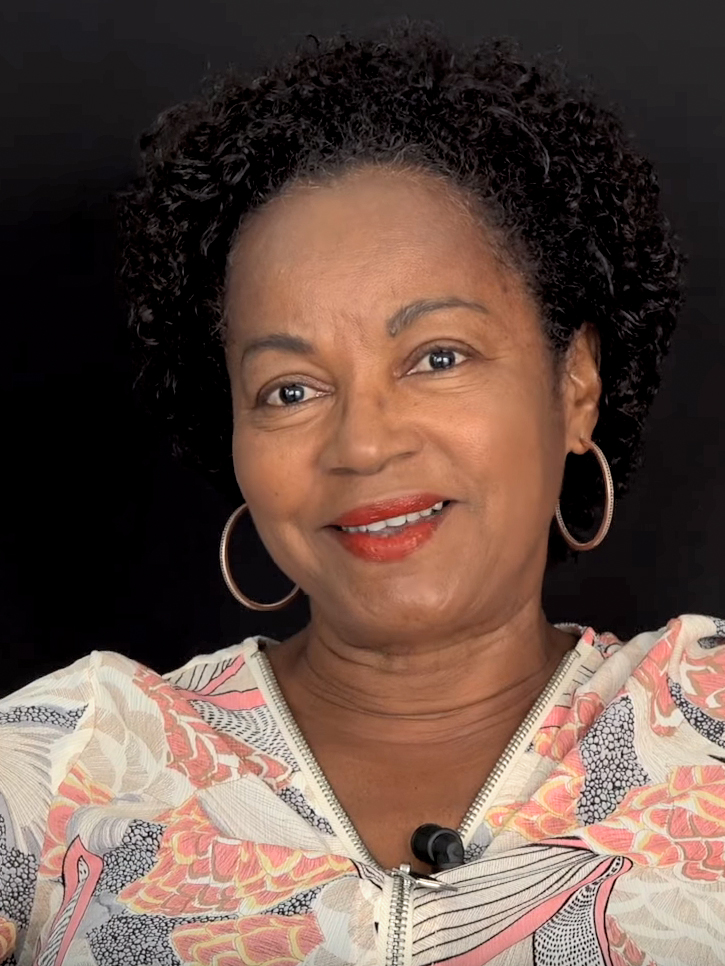
- Gisèle Pineau (2018)
- Born: 18 May 1956; Paris
- Occupations: Writer, nurse scientist
- Awards: Grand prix des lectrices de Elle (Novels) (1994); Prix RFO du livre (1996); Prix Terre de France (1996); Prix Amerigo Vespucci (1998); Officier of the Ordre des Arts et des Lettres (2006); (2006); Knight of the National Order of Merit (2011); prix du roman historique (2021)

Gisèle Pineau (born 18 May 1956) is a French novelist, writer and former psychiatric nurse. Although born in Paris, her origins are Guadeloupean and she has written several books on the difficulties and torments of her childhood as a Black person growing up in Parisian society.

== Early life and career ==
In 1956, Gisèle Pineau was born in Paris, France. During her youth, she divided her time between France and Guadeloupe due to her father's stationing in the military. Pineau struggled with her identity as a Black immigrant due to the racism and xenophobia she experienced at her all-white school in the Kremlin-Bicêtre suburb. Pineau took to writing in order to console the difficulties of her French upbringing and Caribbean heritage, as her works would connect the two cultures rather than separating them. She is aligned with the créolité literary movement, and in the 1990s was among the most prominent of Guadeloupean créolité-adjacent writers, alongside Ernest Pépin.

In her writings, she uses the oral tradition of storytelling in fictional works to reclaim the narratives of Caribbean culture. She also focuses on racism and the effects it can have on a young girl trying to discover her own cultural identity. Her book L'Exil Selon Julia highlights this, as she relies on the memories and experiences of her aged grandmother to help her learn about her society's traditions and her own cultural background. In the book, she also mentions that the discrimination she felt as a child did not only apply to French society in Paris, but also to the people of Guadeloupe, who rejected her for being too cosmopolitan upon her return to the land of her ancestors.

For many years, she lived in Paris and, whilst maintaining her writing career, has also returned to being a psychiatric nurse in order to balance out her life; but she recently moved back to Guadeloupe.

== Bibliography ==
- 1992: Un papillon dans la cité
- 1993: La Grande Drive des esprits, Grand prix des lectrices de Elle
- 1995: L'Espérance-Macadam, Prix RFO du livre (1996)
- 1996: L'Exil selon Julia
- 1998: L’âme prêtée aux oiseaux
- 1998: Le cyclone Marilyn
- 1998: Femmes des Antilles
- 1999: Caraïbe sur Seine
- 2001: Case mensonge
- 2002: Chair piment
- 2004: Les colères du Volcan
- 2005: Fleur de barbarie
- 2007: Mes quatre femmes
- 2007: C'est la règle
- 2008: Morne Câpresse
- 2010: Folie, aller simple
- 2010: L’odyssée d’Alizée
- 2012: Cent Vies et des Poussières
- 2015: Les voyages de Merry Sisal
