= Mohammed Aïssaoui =

French journalist and writer

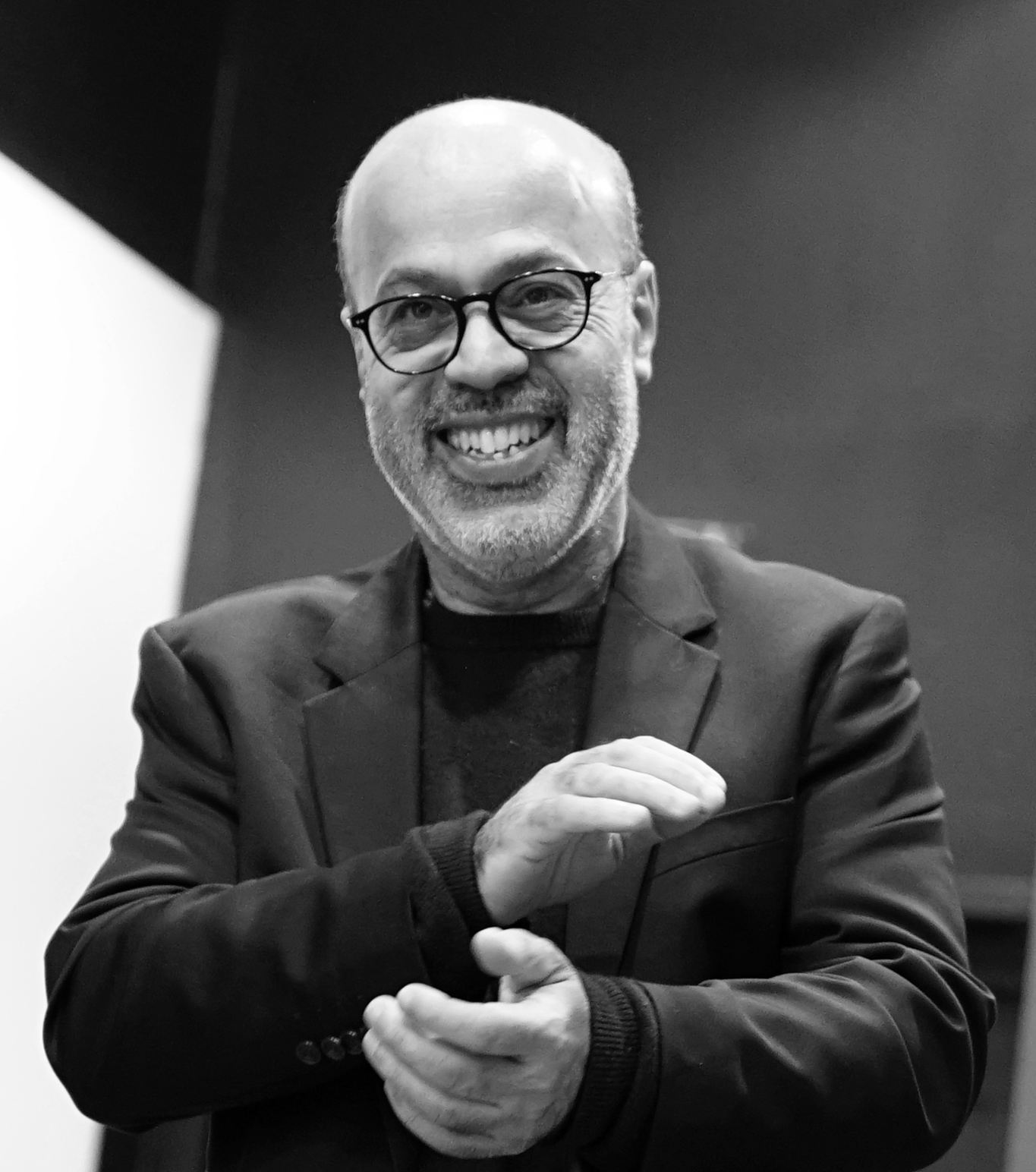
Mohammed Aïssaoui at Rheims, 2021

Mohammed Aïssaoui (French pronunciation: [mɔamɛd aisawi]; born 1964, Algiers) is a French writer and journalist. He is currently working for Le Figaro littéraire.

== Works ==
- 2006: Le Goût d'Alger. Paris: Mercure de France. 2006. p. 131. ISBN 978-2-7152-2590-9..
- 2010: L'Affaire de l'esclave Furcy. Hors série littérature. Paris: Éditions Gallimard. 2010. p. 208. ISBN 978-2-07-012867-9..
  - Prix Renaudot de l'essai 2010.
  - Prix RFO du livre 2010.
- 2012: L'Étoile jaune et le Croissant. Gallimard. 2012. p. 176. ISBN 978-2-07-013891-3..
- 2014: Petit éloge des souvenirs, Gallimard, 128 p. ISBN 978-2-07-045932-2
- 2015: Comment dit-on humour en arabe ?. Paris: Folio. 22 October 2015. p. 144. ISBN 978-2-07-046645-0..
- 2020: Les Funambules. Paris: Editions Gallimard. 3 September 2020. p. 224. ISBN 978-2-07-290407-3..
- 2023: Dictionnaire amoureux d'Albert Camus. Paris: Plon. 2 November 2023. p. 528. ISBN 978-2-25-930555-6..

== Theatrical adaptation ==
- 2012–2013:L'Affaire de l'esclave Furcy has been adapted to the theatre and directed by Hassane Kassi Kouyaté and Patrick Le Mauff, in coproduction with Le Tarmac – La Scène internationale francophone in Paris, where it was performed from 20 November to 15 December 2012, before touring in 2013 at La Réunion, then Chambéry.

== Cinema adaptation ==
- 2026: Furcy, né libre (adaptation of the novel L'Affaire de l'esclave Furcy) directed by Abd al Malik.
