= Victoire Jasmin =

French politician (1955–2023)

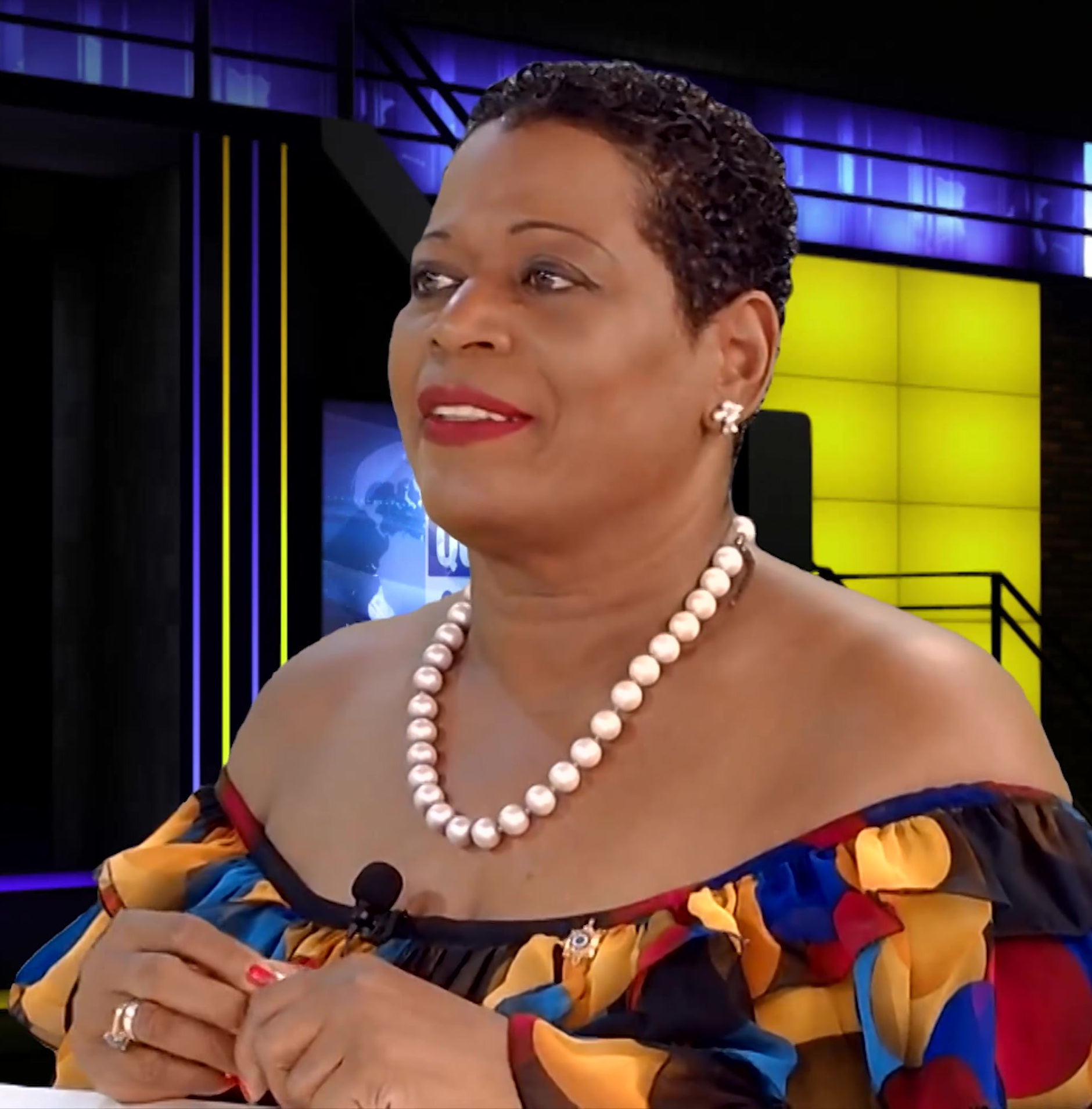
- Victoire JASMIN television interview

Member of the French Senate for Guadeloupe
- In office 2 October 2017 – 1 October 2023

Personal details
- Born: 23 December 1955 Morne-à-l'Eau, Guadeloupe
- Died: 6 October 2023 (aged 67) 14th arrondissement of Paris, France
- Party: Socialist Party
- Children: 3
- Profession: Nurse

Victoire Jasmin (23 December 1955 – 6 October 2023) was a French Socialist politician. She represented Guadeloupe in the French Senate.

== Life and career ==
Victoire Jasmin was born in Morne-à-l'Eau on 23 December 1955.

Jasmin worked as a nurse in Pointe-à-Pitre. She was later elected in the 2017 French Senate election.

During the COVID-19 pandemic in Guadeloupe, she called on the French government to appease the growing social unrest on the island. Jasmin also opposed mandatory vaccination.

Jasmin was the mother of three children. She died on 6 October 2023 in Paris at the age of 67.
