= Mona Guérin =

Haitian educator and writer

Mona Guérin (October 9, 1934 – December 30, 2011) was a Haitian educator and writer.

== Life ==
The daughter of Gontran Rouzier and Camille Duplessy, she was born Mona Rouzier in Port-au-Prince. She studied with the Sœurs de Saint-Joseph de Cluny and at the Pensionnat Sainte-Rose de Lima in Port-au-Prince. She received a bursary from the Canada Arts Council which allowed her to study contemporary literature at Saint Paul University in Ottawa. On her return to Haiti, she married Joseph Guérin, an engineer; the couple had two daughters. She taught school from 1965 to 1980.

From 1961 to 1965, she wrote a weekly column for Le Nouvelliste. Guérin also wrote scripts for the television series Gala de Galerie which appeared on Télé-Haïti from 1977 to 1981 and for the radio series Roye ! Les Voilà which was broadcast from 1982 to 1994. She was host of the radio program Dieu à tout moment (1992-1994) and also wrote about sixty episodes for the radio series Petit théâtre de Magik-Stéréo.

In 1983, she was named a Chevalier in the French Ordre des Palmes Académiques.

Guérin died in Port-au-Prince at the age of 77 after contracting pneumonia.

== Selected works ==
=== Theatre ===
- L'Oiseau de ces dames (1966)
- Les Cinq Chéris (1969)
- La Pieuvre (1971)
- Chambre 26 (1973)
- Sylvia (1974)
- La Pension Vacher (1976)

=== Other works ===
- Sur les vieux thèmes, poetry (1958)
- Mi-figue, mi-raisin, stories (1998), received the Prix littéraire des Caraïbes from the Association des écrivains de langue française
