= Louis-Philippe Dalembert =

Haitian poet and novelist (born 1962)

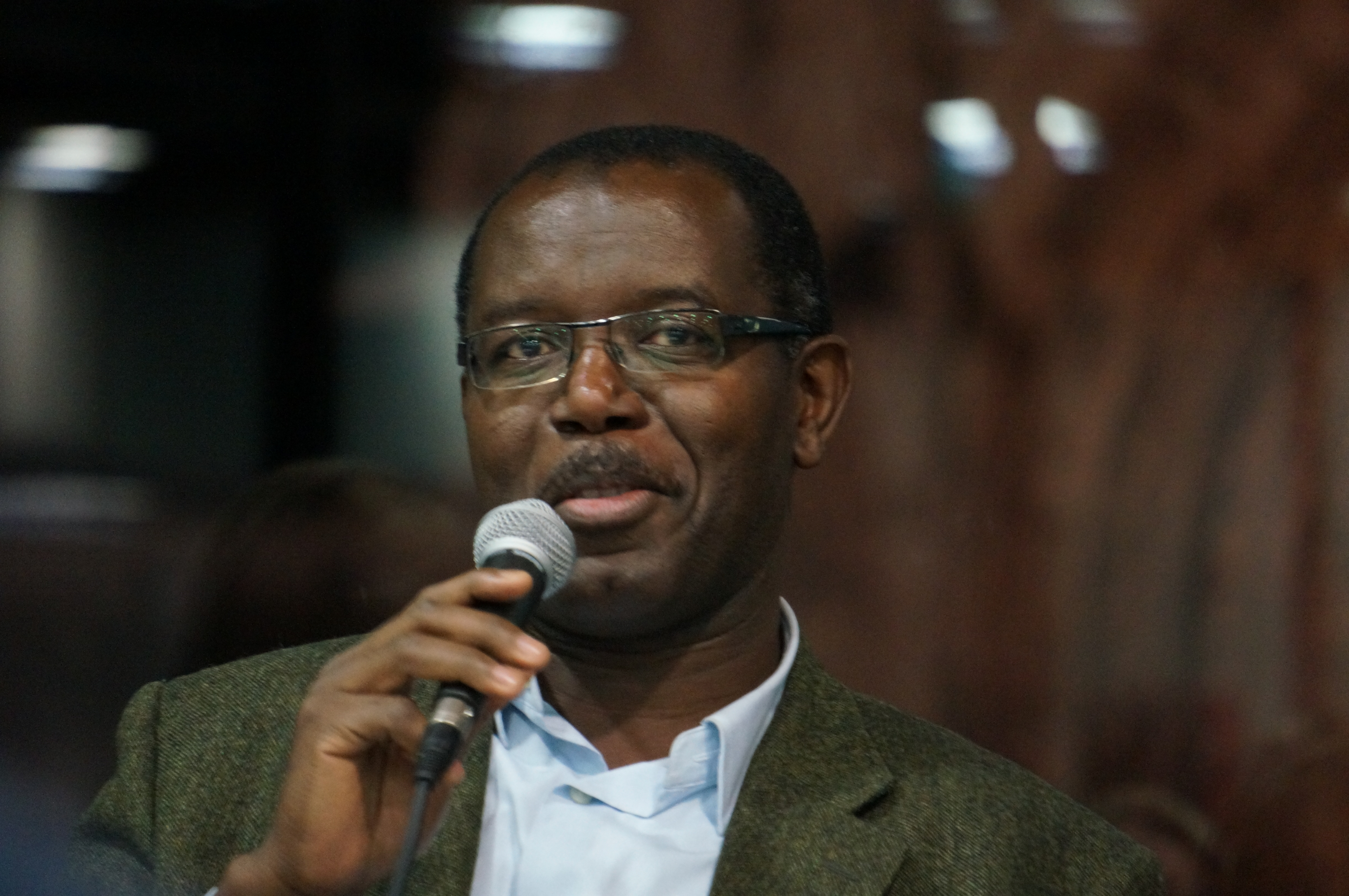
- Born: December 1962 (age 63–64); Port-au-Prince, Haiti
- Education: University of Paris
- Occupations: Poet and novelist
- Writing career
- Genres: Poetry; novel; essay
- Notable awards: Prix Goncourt

Louis-Philippe Dalembert (French pronunciation: [lwi filip dalɑ̃bɛʁ]; born December 1962) is a Haitian poet and novelist. He writes in both French and Haitian creole. His works have been translated into several languages. He was awarded the Goncourt Prize for poetry for his body of work. He now divides his home between Paris, France, and Port-au-Prince, Haiti.

== Life ==
The son of a school teacher and principal, Louis-Philippe Dalembert was born in Port-au-Prince, Haiti, in December 1962. His father's death, a few months later, drastically affected the economic situation of the family. As a result, he spent his early childhood in the populous neighbourhood of Bel-Air. With his mother needing to travel away during the week to teach in the countryside, he grew up surrounded by his mother’s cousins, his elder sister, his great-aunts and his maternal grandmother, in a Port-au-Prince. At the age of six his family moved away from that neighbourhood. He drew on these formative years to compose his novel Le Crayon du bon Dieu n'a pas de gomme.

During the 60s and 70s, drive in theaters were popular in Port Au Prince. One of these happened to be located right behind the new house, over the ravine. In the evening, the entire neighbourhood would meet on the empty lot and watch the film. Dalembert saw Westerns, Kung fu films, and Bernardo Bertolucci's 1972 Last Tango in Paris. The theater had no sound, forcing Dalembert to imagine dialogue.

Trained in literature and journalism, Dalembert worked first as a journalist in his homeland, before leaving in 1986 for France, where he obtained his PhD in comparative literature at the Sorbonne with a dissertation on the Cuban author, Alejo Carpentier, and a master in journalism from the Ecole Supérieure de Journalisme de Paris. Since leaving Haiti, he has lived in Nancy, Paris, Rome, Jerusalem, Brazzaville, Kinshasa, and Florence. His works have been translated into several languages including English, Spanish, Italian, German, Danish, Portuguese, Greek, and Serbo-Croatian.

Today Dalembert lives in-between France and Haiti. He sporadically teaches in universities, such as the University of Wisconsin-Milwaukee, Freie Universität Berlin, University of Bern, and Sciences Po Paris as holder of the Writer-in-Residence Chair (2021). He is also known to be an avid soccer fan.

== Works ==
Novels and short stories

- Le Songe d’une photo d’enfance, short stories. Paris: Le Serpent à Plumes, 1993; Paris: Le Serpent à Plumes, 2005.
- Le crayon du bon Dieu n’a pas de gomme. Paris: Stock, 1996; Paris: Le Serpent à Plumes, 2004. Port-au-Prince: Editions des Presses Nationales, 2006.
- L'Autre Face de la mer, novel. Paris: Stock, 1998; Paris: Le Serpent à Plumes, 2005. Port-au-Prince: Editions des Presses Nationales, 2007.
- L'Ile du bout des rêves. Paris: Bibliophane/Daniel Radford, 2003. Paris: Le Serpent à Plumes, 2007.
- Rue du Faubourg Saint-Denis. Monaco: Editions du Rocher, 2005.
- Les dieux voyagent la nuit, novel. Monaco: Editions du Rocher, 2006.
- Histoires d'amour impossibles... ou presque, short stories. Monaco: Éditions du Rocher, 2007.
- Noires blessures, novel. Paris: Mercure de France, 2011.
- Les Bas-Fonds de la mémoire, short stories. Port-au-Prince, 2012
- Ballade d'un amour inachevé, novel. Paris: Mercure de France, 2013; Port-au-Prince: C3 Éditions, 2014.
- Avant que les ombres s'effacent, novel. Paris: Sabine Wespieser éditeur, 2017.
- Mur Méditerranée, novel. Paris: Sabine Wespieser éditeur, 2019.
- Milwaukee Blues, Paris: Sabine Wespieser éditeur, 2021.

In Haitian creole:

- Epi oun jou konsa tèt Pastè Bab pati, novel. Port-au-Prince: Editions des Presses Nationales, 2007.

Essays

- Le Roman de Cuba. Éditions du Rocher, Monaco, 2009.
- Haïti, une traversée littéraire, in collaboration with Lyonel Trouillot. Paris: Éditions Philippe Rey/Culturesfrance, 2010.

Poetry

- Evangile pour les miens. Port-au-Prince: Choucoune, 1982.
- Et le soleil se souvient (followed by), Pages cendres et palmes d’aube. Paris: L'Harmattan, 1989.
- Du temps et d'autres nostalgies. Les Cahiers de la Villa Medicis 9.1 (1995): 24–38.
- Ces îles de plein sel. Vwa (La Chaux-de-fonds) 24 (1996): 151–171.
- Ces îles de plein sel et autres poèmes. Ivry-sur-Seine: silex/Nouvelles du Sud, 2000.
- Dieci poesie (Errance). Quaderni di via Montereale (Pordenone) 4 (2000).
- Poème pour accompagner l'absence. Montréal: Mémoire d’encrier, 2005.
- Transhumances. Paris: Riveneuve éditions, 2010.
- En marche sur la terre. Paris: Éditions Bruno Doucey, 2017
- Cantique du balbutiement. Paris: Éditions Bruno Doucey, 2020
- Ces îles de plein sel et autres recueils. Paris: Éditions Points Poésie, 2021

== Translation into English ==
- The Other Side of the Sea (translation by Robert H. McCormick Jr), novel. University of Virginia Press, Charlottesville and London, 2014.

== Prizes and awards ==
- 1987: Grand Prix de poésie de la Ville d’Angers for Et le soleil se souvient.
- 1994–95: Resident at the Villa Médicis, Rome.
- 1997: Unesco/Aschberg Grant. Writer-in-residence at Mishkenot Sha'anamin, Jerusalem.
- 1998: Poncetton Grant, Société des Gens de Lettres, for L'Autre Face de la mer.
- 1999: Prix RFO du livre, for L'Autre Face de la mer.
- 2003: Centre national du livre (CNL) Creation Grant for Rue du Faubourg Saint-Denis.
- 2006: French Institute of Tunisia Grant. Writer-in-residence in Tunis.
- 2008: Casa de las Américas Prize for Les dieux voyagent la nuit: Cuba.
- 2010: DAAD Artists-in-Berlin Program guest: Berlin.
- 2011: Prix spécial "Ville de Limoges" for Noires Blessures, Limoges.
- 2011: Best Essay 2011, Trophées des arts afro-caribéens for Haïti. Une traversée littéraire, Paris.
- 2013: Prix Thyde Monnier de la Société des gens de lettres for Ballade d'un amour inachevé, Paris.
- 2014: Prix du jury de l'Algue d'Or for Ballade d'un amour inachevé, Saint-Briac-sur-Mer.
- 2017: Prix Orange du Livre and Prix France Bleu/Page des libraires for Avant que les ombres s'effacent
- 2017: Grand Prix du roman de l'Académie française shortlist for Avant que les ombres s'effacent
- 2017: Prix Médicis shortlist for Avant que les ombres s'effacent
- 2018: Prix littéraire de Cenon, Prix du Jury for Avant que les ombres s'effacent
- 2018: Prix Résidence d'auteur de la Fondation des Treilles
- 2019: Prix de la langue française for Mur Méditerranée
- 2019: Goncourt des Lycéens shortlist for Mur Méditerranée
- 2019: Goncourt Choice of Poland for Mur Méditerranée
- 2019: Goncourt Choice of Switzerland for Mur Méditerranée
- 2024: Prix Goncourt de la Poésie
