= Gary Victor =

Haitian writer, playwright and scriptwriter (born 1958)

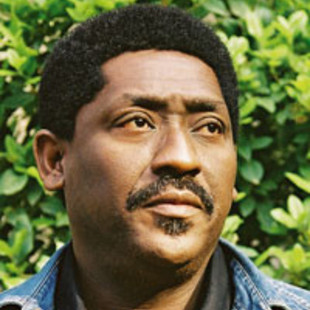
- Born: 9 July 1958; Port-au-Prince, Haiti
- Occupation: Writer, playwright, politician
- Awards: Knight of the National Order of Merit (2001); Prix littéraire des Caraïbes (2007); Prix RFO du livre (2004); Casa de las Américas Prize (2012); Prix du Rayonnement de la langue et de la littérature françaises (2018); (2017)

Gary Victor (born 9 July 1958 in Port-au-Prince) is a Haitian writer, playwright, and scriptwriter for television and radio. His radio sketches and the uncompromising tone of his television series on the manners of the Haitian bourgeoisie provoked controversy and discussion. He also served as the General Secretary of the Senate of Haiti from 1996 to 2000.

== Biography ==
Victor was born in Port-au-Prince and is the son of the sociologist René Victor. After studying agronomy, he worked as a civil servant at the Ministry of Planning and other ministries before becoming a journalist. He has become well known as a writer for radio, film and television. From 1976 to 1983, Gary Victor published short works of fiction in the state newspaper, Le Nouveau Monde, and subsequently, in the daily Le Nouvelliste, where he was a columnist from 1983 to 1990. He was editor of the daily Le Matin until June 2004.

== Awards ==
- 2001: Ordre national du Mérite of France, All his work
- 2003: Prix du Livre insulaire (fiction) à Ouessant, À l'angle des rues parallèles
- 2004: Prix RFO du livre, Je sais quand Dieu vient se promener dans mon jardin
- 2008: Prix littéraire des Caraïbes, Les cloches de la Brésilienne
- 2012: Casa de las Américas Prize, Le sang et la mer

== Works ==
Novels

- Clair de Manbo, 1990
- Un octobre d'Élyaniz, 1996
- La Piste des sortillèges, 1996 reprinted in 2002
- Le Diable dans un thé à la citronnelle, 1998 reprinted in 2005
- À l'angle des rues parallèles, 2000 reprinted in 2003
- Le Cercle des époux fidèles, 2002
- Je sais quand Dieu vient se promener dans mon jardin, 2004
- Dernières nouvelles du colonialisme, 2006
- Les Cloches de la Brésilienne, 2006
- Nuit Albinos, 2007
- Banal oubli, 2008
- Saison de porcs, 2009
- Le sang et la mer, 2010
- Soro, 2011
- Maudite éducation, éditions Philippe Rey, 2012
- Cures et châtiments, 2013
- Le sang et la mer II: Hérodiane, 2016
- Les Temps de la cruauté, 2017
- Masi, 2018
- Un homme dangereux, 2022
