= Liliane Dévieux-Dehoux =

Haitian and Canadian author, poet, and journalist

- Dévieux-Dehoux before 1987
- Born: 29 December 1942; Port-au-Prince, Haiti
- Died: 7 January 2020 (aged 77); Montreal, Quebec, Canada
- Education: Université de Montréal
- Occupations: Author; poet; journalist
- Children: 3
- Writing career
- Language: French
- Notable awards: Prix littéraire des Caraïbes; 1978

Liliane Dévieux-Dehoux (29 December 1942 – 7 January 2020) was a Haitian and Canadian author, poet, and journalist. She was born in Port-au-Prince and wrote stories and kept a diary as a child. After secondary school, she studied literature in France. Already a mother of one child with a Haitian husband, she moved to Montreal, Quebec, with them in 1964 to further her studies at the Université de Montréal. She had two more children there. In the 1970s and 1980s, Dévieux-Dehoux published poetry and short stories in many publications. Her 1976 novel L'Amour, oui. La mort, non (Love, Yes. Death, No) was popular among Caribbean critics and won a Prix littéraire des Caraïbes (Caribbean Literary Prize). She became a journalist and interviewer for Radio Canada International in 1976 and joined her university's Centre de recherches caraïbes (Centre of Caribbean Research) in 1981. At the centre, she focused on Haitian oral tradition.

Economic and political migration are major themes in Dévieux-Dehoux's work, which also questions traditional gender roles. L'Amour, oui. La mort, non combines sources of inspiration from Haitian literature to evoke the struggles of Haitian migrant workers. Her short story "Piano-Bar" suggests that migration has allowed women to escape the patriarchal aspects of Caribbean culture.

== Biography ==
Liliane Dévieux-Dehoux was born on 29 December 1942 in Port-au-Prince, Haiti. Dévieux-Dehoux wrote stories as a child and enjoyed visiting universities. Her parents, both professors, bought her a diary at age nine, which she used in adolescence. In Port-au-Prince, she studied at the Sainte-Rose-de-Lima secondary school and received a baccalauréat specializing in humanities in 1961. She continued studying literature in France at the Catholic University of Paris. Dévieux-Dehoux married a Haitian man and had a child before moving to Canada with them in 1964. She studied literature at the Université de Montréal (UdeM) in Quebec but paused her studies to live in the United States for her husband's work. (Note: Dévieux-Dehoux's entry in Dictionnaire des auteurs de langue française en Amérique du Nord places her living in the United States before her studies at the Université de Montréal, but her autobiographical entry in D'Haïti au Québec : quelques parcours de femmes places it afterward.)

Dévieux-Dehoux had two more children after returning to Montreal. She received a licence in liberal arts from UdeM in 1970, taught in the city between 1971 and 1973, (Note: In 1972, she received a diploma from a normal school for primary education.) and began publishing poetry in the magazine Poésie Quebéc (Quebec Poetry). Dévieux-Dehoux published poetry and short stories in many literary journals and magazines in the 1970s and 1980s, including in Écriture française (French Writing) and Prométhée (Prometheus). She also published essays in Digeste éclair (Flash Digest). In 1976, Éditions Naaman published her only novel, L'Amour, oui. La mort, non (Love, Yes. Death, No), about a Haitian medical student struggling to accept two losses: her brother, who died in an accident, and her lover, who died in the Vietnam War. The novel was initially rejected by many Quebecois publishers, including feminist publishers, which she attributed to increasingly nationalist and self-interested politics in the province. It eventually became her most popular work and was praised by Caribbean critics for its portrayal of the psychological effects of the Vietnam War in Haiti, winning the Prix littéraire des Caraïbes (Caribbean Literary Prize) in 1978. L'Amour, oui. La mort, non received some criticism for its erotic passages, though Dévieux-Dehoux dismissed these objections as censorship.

In 1976, Dévieux-Dehoux also became a journalist and interviewer for Radio Canada International (RCI). Some of her short stories, including "Complainte pour un voleur" ("Lament for a Thief"), "Métempsychose" ("Metempsychosis"), and "Ti-Jean et compère cheval" ("Ti-Jean and His Horse Companion"), were recited on the radio station. In 1981, she became a researcher at UdeM's Centre de recherches caraïbes (Centre of Caribbean Research) and received a maîtrise in liberal arts from the university for a thesis about Ti Malice and Bouki, two characters in Haitian mythology. At the research centre, Dévieux-Dehoux worked with the musicologist Claude Dauphin on a project which compiled and analyzed Haitian oral tradition. In 1982, she visited Haiti to record audio of traditional stories using money she received from a grant by the Canadian government. The project concluded that stories in rural communities were more developed and dynamic than in cities. She continued working at RCI and the research centre until at least 1986.

Dévieux-Dehoux's short story "Piano-Bar" debuted in 1983 in Mot pour mot (Word for Word) but received more popularity in 1988 in Conjonction, a major literary journal in Port-au-Prince. Lizabeth Paravisini-Gebert translated the story to English in her 1991 anthology of Caribbean women writers. The story is set in a smokey piano bar in Quebec and follows a couple, both Haitian immigrants, who reflect on their past and present. In 2001, Dévieux-Dehoux published Cuba libre : Témoignage (Free Cuba: A Testimony), a book recounting her vacation to Cuba in 1959 with her mother, following the Cuban Revolution. It was based on her teenage diary. In the 2010s, she passed on traditional songs and stories to her grandchildren. Dévieux-Dehoux died in Montreal on 7 January 2020.

== Style and themes ==
Dévieux-Dehoux was part of a generation of Caribbean women writers who left their countries due to economic and political problems or in search of publishing opportunities abroad. Economic and political migration are major themes in her work, which also questions traditional gender roles and suggests that women living away from the Caribbean will become self-exiled and unable to return. Dévieux-Dehoux said in an interview that she waited for sudden inspiration, often dreams and memories, before writing. She primarily wrote for herself, as a means of resolving internal conflicts, but then wrote for her audience, the Haitian public, by including societal messages she was contemplating. She would wait between a day and many years before revising drafts.

The professor Maximilien Laroche praised L'Amour, oui. La mort, non for its many sources of inspiration from Haitian literature (including the zombie myth, a character returning from Europe, a thwarted madman, and the ideal of returning home), which combine into a discussion of the Haitian diaspora. In particular, he believed that the protagonist's lover Gabriel, who joined the United States Army to support his family only to die in Vietnam, represents the ironic idea that Haitian migrant workers, "in trying to save themselves, only more surely kill themselves". (Note: Original: qu'en essayant de sauver sa vie, ce dernier ne fait que se donner plus sûrement la mort.) The critic Maryse Condé felt that the novel, by portraying Gabriel dying for a cause he is uninterested in and for a country that oppresses his own, transcended an isolation from international conflicts common in Haitian literature. According to Paravisini-Gebert and Carmen C. Esteves, Dévieux-Dehoux's short story "Piano-Bar" suggests that migration has allowed women to leave behind the patriarchal aspects of Caribbean culture. In the story, the protagonist Eva loses her cultural origins while adapting to her new environment.

== Works cited ==
- D'Haïti au Québec : quelques parcours de femmes (in French). Les Éditions du CIDIHCA. 2016. ISBN 978-2-89454-500-3.
- "Dévieux, Liliane". Corporation des thanatologues du Québec (in French). Archived from the original on 28 June 2025.
- Condé, Maryse (1979). La parole des femmes: essai sur des romancières des Antilles de langue française (in French). L'Harmattan. ISBN 978-2-85802-114-7.
- Esteves, Carmen C.; Paravisini-Gebert, Lizabeth, eds. (1991). Green Cane and Juicy Flotsam: Short Stories by Caribbean Women. Rutgers University Press. ISBN 978-0-8135-1738-4.
- Figueredo, D. H., ed. (2006). Encyclopedia of Caribbean Literature. Vol. 2. Greenwood Press. ISBN 978-0-313-32742-1.
- Graciano, Berta (1999). "'We Are No Longer là-bas': Immigration and Gender Differences in Liliane Dévieux's 'Piano Bar'". Sargasso. 16: 94–102.
- Hamel, Réginald [in French]; Hare, John; Wyczynski, Paul, eds. (1989). Dictionnaire des auteurs de langue française en Amérique du Nord (in French). Éditions Fides. ISBN 978-2-7621-1475-1.
- Herdeck, Donald E., ed. (1979). Caribbean Writers: A Bio-bibliographical-critical Encyclopedia. Three Continents Press. ISBN 978-0-914478-74-4.
- Jonassaint, Jean (1986). Le pouvoir des mots, les maux du pouvoir: des romanciers haïtiens de l'exil (in French). Arcantère. ISBN 978-2-7606-0738-5.
- Laroche, Maximilien [in French] (1976). "Liliane Devieux Dehoux: L'amour, oui. La mort, non". Livres et auteurs québécois (in French): 66–67.
- Lequin, Lucie; Verthuy, Maïr, eds. (1996). Multi-culture, multi-écriture: la voix migrante au féminin en France et au Canada (in French). L'Harmattan. ISBN 978-2-7384-4252-9.
- Paravisini-Gebert, Lizabeth; Torres-Seda, Olga, eds. (1993). Caribbean Women Novelists: An Annotated Critical Bibliography. Bloomsbury Academic. ISBN 978-0-313-28342-0.
