= Daniel Maximin =

French novelist, poet, and essayist

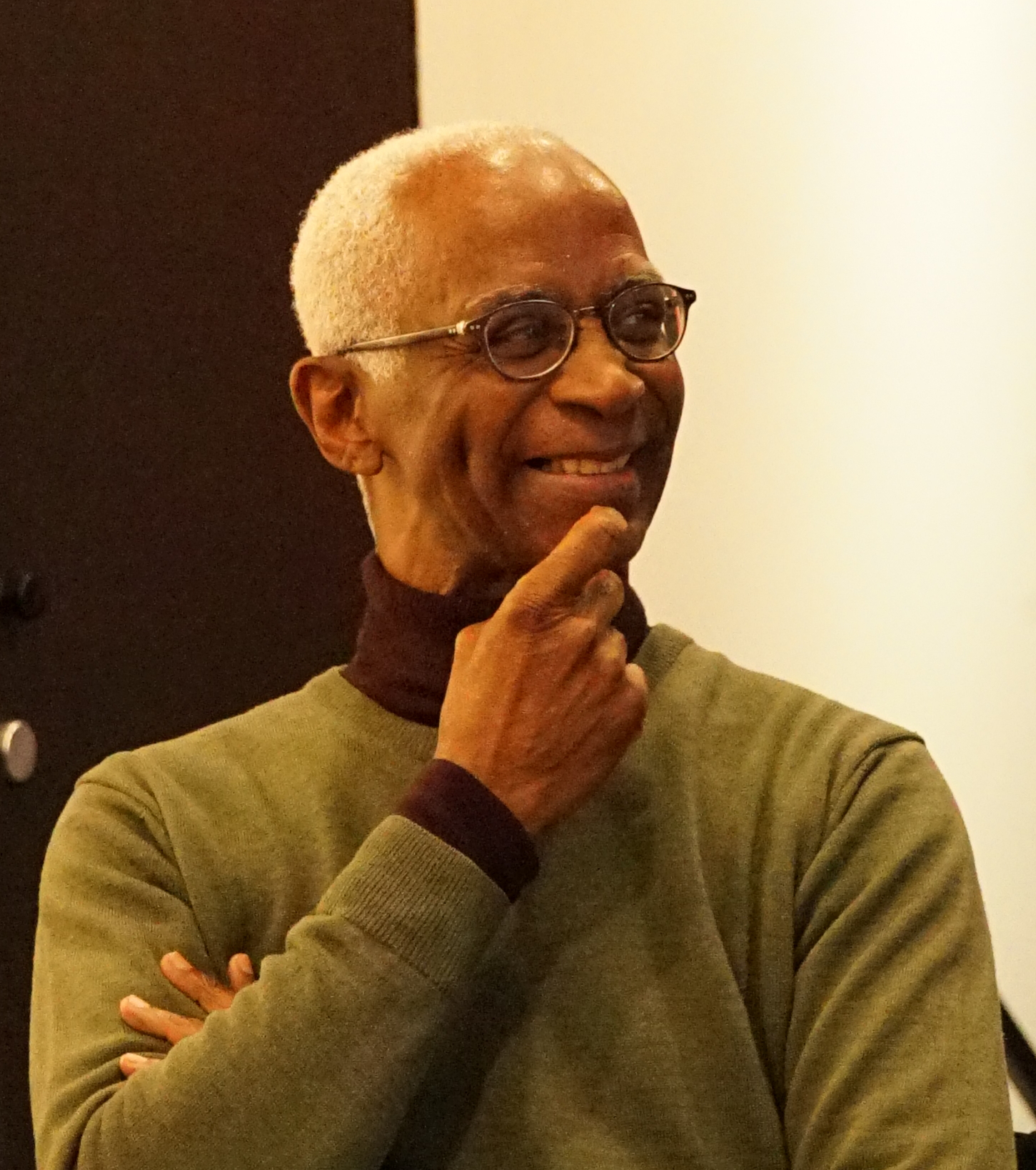
- Daniel Maximin in 2017
- Born: 9 April 1947 (age 79); Saint-Claude, Guadeloupe
- Occupation: writer
- Writing career
- Genres: novels; poetry; essays
- Notable work: L'Isolé Soleil
- Notable awards: Prix littéraire des Caraïbes (1987); Prix Hervé Deluen (2017); knight of the Légion d'honneur (1993)

Daniel Maximin (born 9 April 1947, Saint-Claude, Guadeloupe) is a French novelist, poet, and essayist. He moved to France in 1960. From 1980 to 1989, Maximin served as literary director of the journal Présence africaine. He returned to Guadeloupe in 1989 as Regional Director of Cultural Affairs. He was named a knight of the Légion d'honneur in 1993.

== Biography ==
Daniel Maximin was born on 9 April 1947 in Saint-Claude, Guadeloupe, at the foot of the Soufrière volcano, which he describes as "my native fire". As a child, he experienced his first hurricane at age seven and witnessed his first volcanic eruption at age nine, recalling the lava and ash as a "joyful firework display".

His family moved to Paris in 1960. In Paris, he studied at the Lycée Voltaire and wrote his first poem at age 15. After earning his baccalaureate in 1964, he studied literature at the Sorbonne for five years.

In the early 1970s, Maximin began his career as a writer while working as a lecturer at the Institute of Social Studies in Lausanne and as a literature teacher in Orly. He also participated in early experimental theatre projects.

In 1981, he published his first novel, L'Isolé Soleil. From 1981 to 1989, he served as literary director at Présence africaine and produced the radio program Antipodes on France Culture. In 1989, he returned to Guadeloupe to become Regional Director of Cultural Affairs.

Maximin was named a knight of the Legion of Honour in 1993 and a knight of Arts and Letters in 1995. In 1997, he was appointed to organise France’s national commemoration of the 150th anniversary of the abolition of slavery.

In addition to novels, Maximin is known for his poetry and essays. His poetry collection L’Invention des désirades won the Arc-en-ciel Prize in 2000. He published his autobiographical work Tu, c’est l’enfance in 2004, which received the Grand Prix Maurice Genevoix and the Prix Tropiques AFD. His essay Les Fruits du cyclone: une géopoétique de la Caraïbe was published in 2006.

In January 2010, he was named Commissioner General of 2011, Year of the Overseas Territories.

He has also worked as an advisor on Francophonie at the French Ministry of Culture and held roles related to literature and education for the Francophone Festival in France. Maximin is considered one of the major contemporary writers of the French Caribbean.

== Works ==
- "Sartre Listening to Savages". Telos 44 (Summer 1980). New York: Telos Press.
- L'Isolé soleil (novel), 1981
- Soufrières (novel), 1987
- Lone Sun, 1989
- L'Invention des désirades (poetry), 2000
- L'Ile et une nuit (novel), 2002
- Tu, c'est l'enfance, 2004 (awarded the Prix Maurice Genevoix)
- Les Fruits du cyclone : Une géopoétique de la Caraïbe, 2006

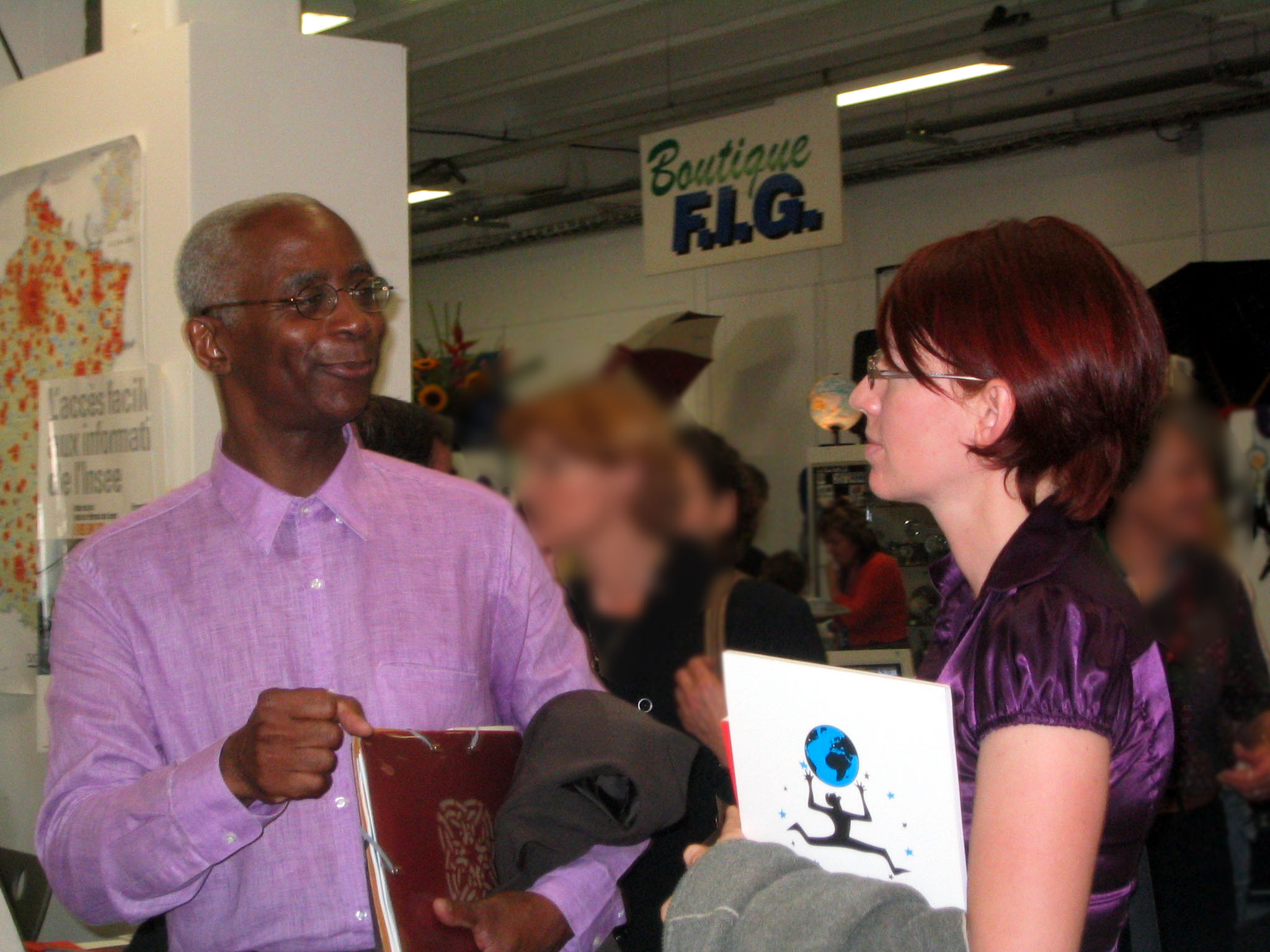
Daniel Maximin in at the salon Livre Amerigo Vespucci (Festival international de géographie at Saint-Dié-des-Vosges in 2006)

== Bibliography ==
- Chaulet-Achour, Christiane. La Trilogie caribéenne de Daniel Maximin : Analyse et contrepoint. Paris, Karthala, 2000.
- Kaufman, Janice Horner. Daniel Maximin, Hélène Cixous and Aimé Césaire : Creolization, Intertextuality, and Coiled Myth. New York, Peter Lang, 2006.
