= Félix Éboué =

French official (1884–1944)

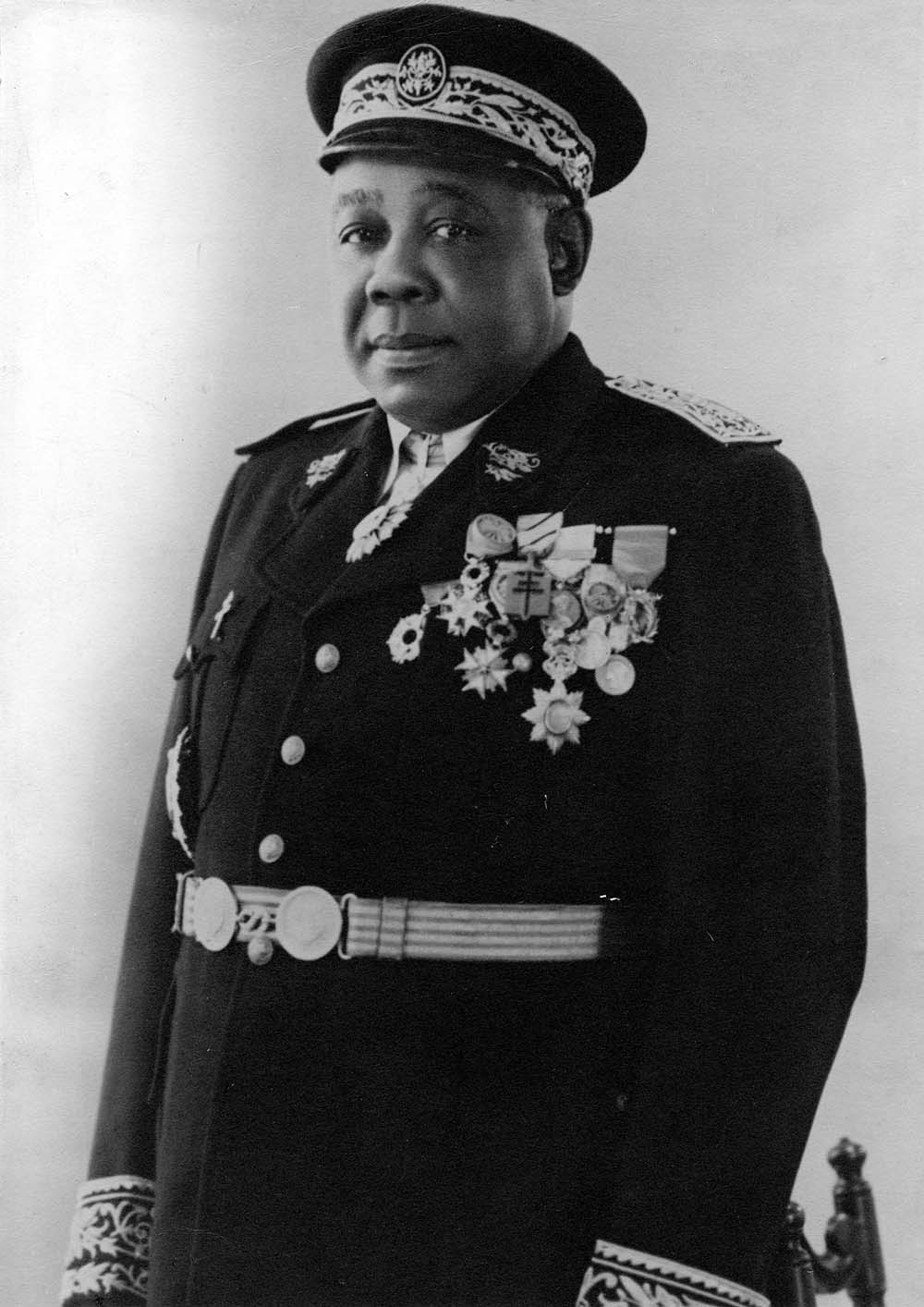
- Éboué, pictured c. 1944

Governor General of French Equatorial Africa
- In office 11 August 1941 – 15 February 1944
- Preceded by: Edgard de Larminat
- Succeeded by: André Bayardelle

Governor of Chad
- In office 1938–1940

Acting Governor of Guadeloupe
- In office 1936–1938

Secretary-General of Martinique
- In office 1933–1934

Personal details
- Pronunciation: French: [adɔlf silvɛstʁ feliks ebwe]
- Born: Adolphe Sylvestre Félix Éboué; 26 December 1884 Cayenne, French Guiana, France
- Died: 17 March 1944 (aged 59) Cairo, Egypt
- Resting place: Panthéon, Paris, France; 48°50′46″N 2°20′45″E
- Party: SFIO
- Spouse: Eugénie Éboué-Tell (1889–1971)
- Relations: Léopold Sédar Senghor (son-in-law)
- Children: 4
- Education: Lycée Montaigne
- Alma mater: École nationale de la France d'Outre-Mer
- Occupation: Civil servant
- Allegiance: Free France

Adolphe Sylvestre Félix Éboué (French: [adɔlf silvɛstʁ feliks ebwe]; 26 December 1884 – 17 May 1944) was a French colonial administrator. He was the first black French man appointed to a high post in the French colonies, when appointed acting governor of Guadeloupe in 1936. As governor of Chad in 1940, he was early and exceptional in supporting Charles de Gaulle's French resistance movement, and was influential in orchestrating the 1944 Brazzaville Conference on colonial reform. He advocated for educating Africans, placed more in the colonial administration, and sought the preservation of indigenous African culture. He was the first black person to be buried in the Panthéon in Paris.

== Early life and education ==
Born in Cayenne, French Guiana, the grandson of slaves, Éboué was the fourth son in a family of five brothers. His father, Yves Urbain Éboué, was a gold prospector, and his mother, Marie Josephine Aurélie Léveillé, was a shop owner born in Roura. She raised her sons in the Guiana Créole tradition.

Éboué won a scholarship to study at secondary school in Bordeaux. Éboué was also a keen footballer, captaining his school team when they travelled to games in both Belgium and England.

== Career ==
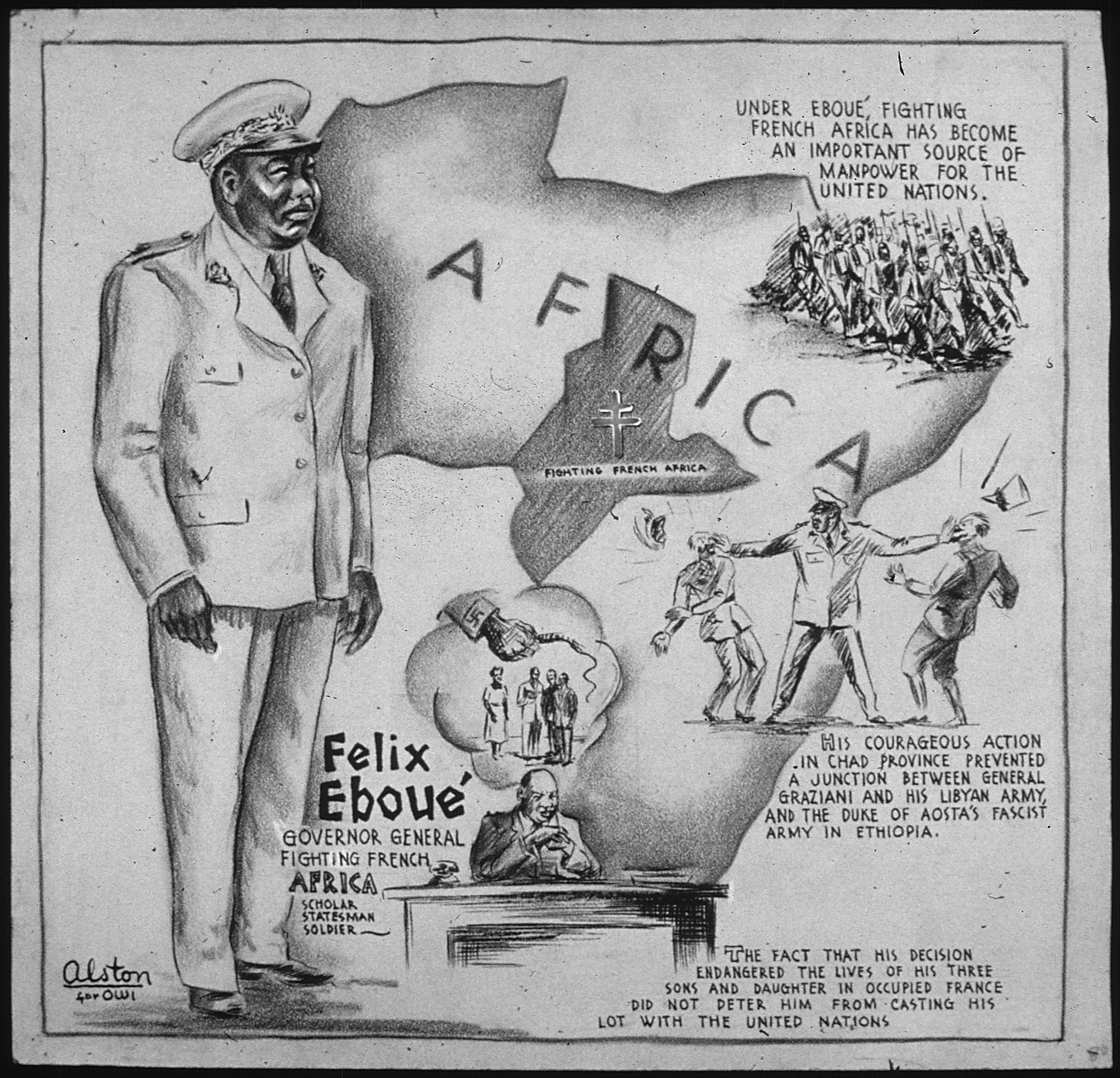
Félix Éboué cartoon by Charles Alston, 1943

In 1908, Éboué graduated in administrative law from the École nationale de la France d'Outre-Mer in Paris. He served as a colonial administrator in Oubangui-Chari for twenty years, and then in Martinique. Himself a Socialist and a Freemason, in 1936, under the Popular Front government, he was appointed acting governor of Guadeloupe. Éboué was the first man of black African descent to be appointed to such a senior post anywhere in the French colonies.

Soon in conflict with the local elite, Eboue lasted only two years before being sent back to central Africa as Governor of Chad, arriving in Fort Lamy on 4 January 1939. After the fall of France, in August 1940 he accepted Charles de Gaulle’s authority and soon persuaded the authorities elsewhere in French Equatorial Africa to do likewise, giving the Free French movement a territorial base from which to exercise sovereignty and organize military forces. De Gaulle wrote of Éboué, "This man of intelligence and heart, this colored man so ardently French, this humanist philosopher, revolted with his whole being against the submission of France and the triumph of Nazi racial intolerance."

=== New indigenous policy for the French empire ===
As governor of French Equatorial Africa between 1940 and 1944, Éboué published The New Indigenous Policy for French Equatorial Africa, which set out the broad lines of a new policy that advocated respect for African traditions, support for traditional leaders, the development of existing social structures and the improvement of working conditions. The document served as a basis for the 1944 Brazzaville Conference of French colonial governors that sought to introduce major improvements for the peoples of the colonies.

He classified 200 educated Africans as "notable évolués" and reduced their taxes, as well as placing some Gabonese civil servants into positions of authority.

== Personal life ==
Éboué married Eugénie Tell. In 1946 one of their daughters, Ginette, married Léopold Sédar Senghor, the poet and future president of independent Senegal.

In 1922, Éboué was initiated as a freemason at "La France Équinoxiale" lodge in Cayenne. During his life he frequented "Les Disciples de Pythagore" and "Maria Deraismes" lodges. He is considered to be the first freemason to have joined the Resistance. His wife, Eugénie, was initiated at Droit Humain in Martinique and his daughter Ginette at Grande Loge Féminine de France.

Éboué died in 1944 of a stroke while in Cairo. His mortal remains were reburied in the Panthéon in Paris in 1949, making Éboué the first black French man honored in this manner.

== Legacy and honours ==
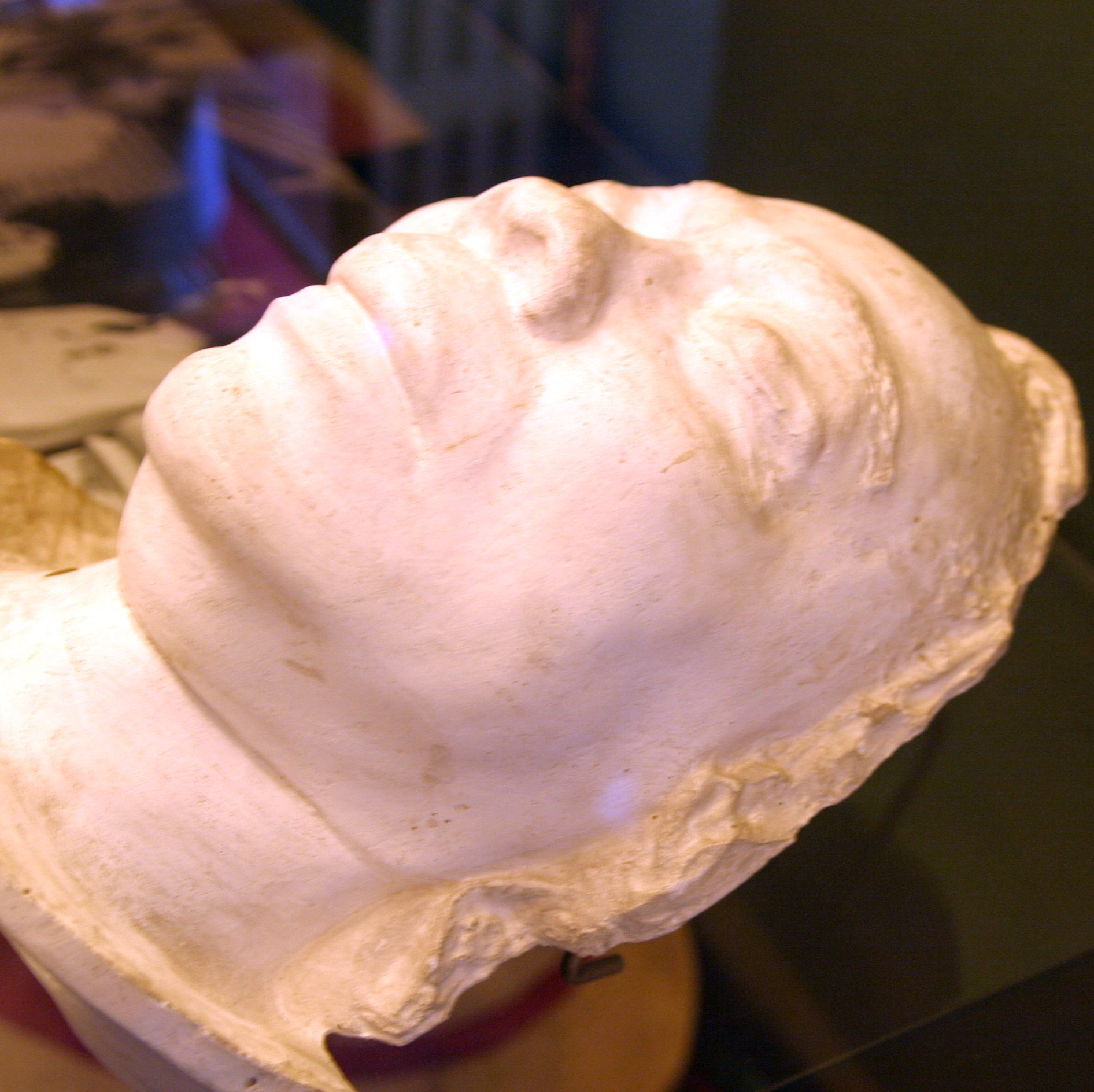
Death mask of Félix Éboué at the Musée de l'Ordre de la Libération

Éboué was awarded an Officer of the Legion of Honour, decorated in 1941 with the Cross of the Liberation and was made a member of the Council of the Order of the Liberation.

In 1961, the Banque Centrale des États de l'Afrique Équatoriale et du Cameroun (Central Bank of Equatorial African States and Cameroon) issued a 100-franc banknote featuring his portrait. The French colonies around the world issued a joint stamp issue in 1945 honouring his memory.

Within France, a square, Place Félix-Éboué, in 12th arrondissement of Paris is named for him, as is the adjacent Paris Métro station Daumesnil Félix-Éboué. A primary school in Le Pecq bears his name and offers bilingual English/French education. A small street near La Défense was named for him.

The main airport of Cayenne, French Guiana, which was previously named after the comte de Rochambeau, was named in his honor in 2012.

The Lycée Félix Éboué in N'Djamena is one of Chad's oldest secondary schools. Founded in 1958 as a general education college, it was made a lycée in 1960, the year that Chad became an independent country. In 2002, it was split into two separate schools, each with about 3000 students.

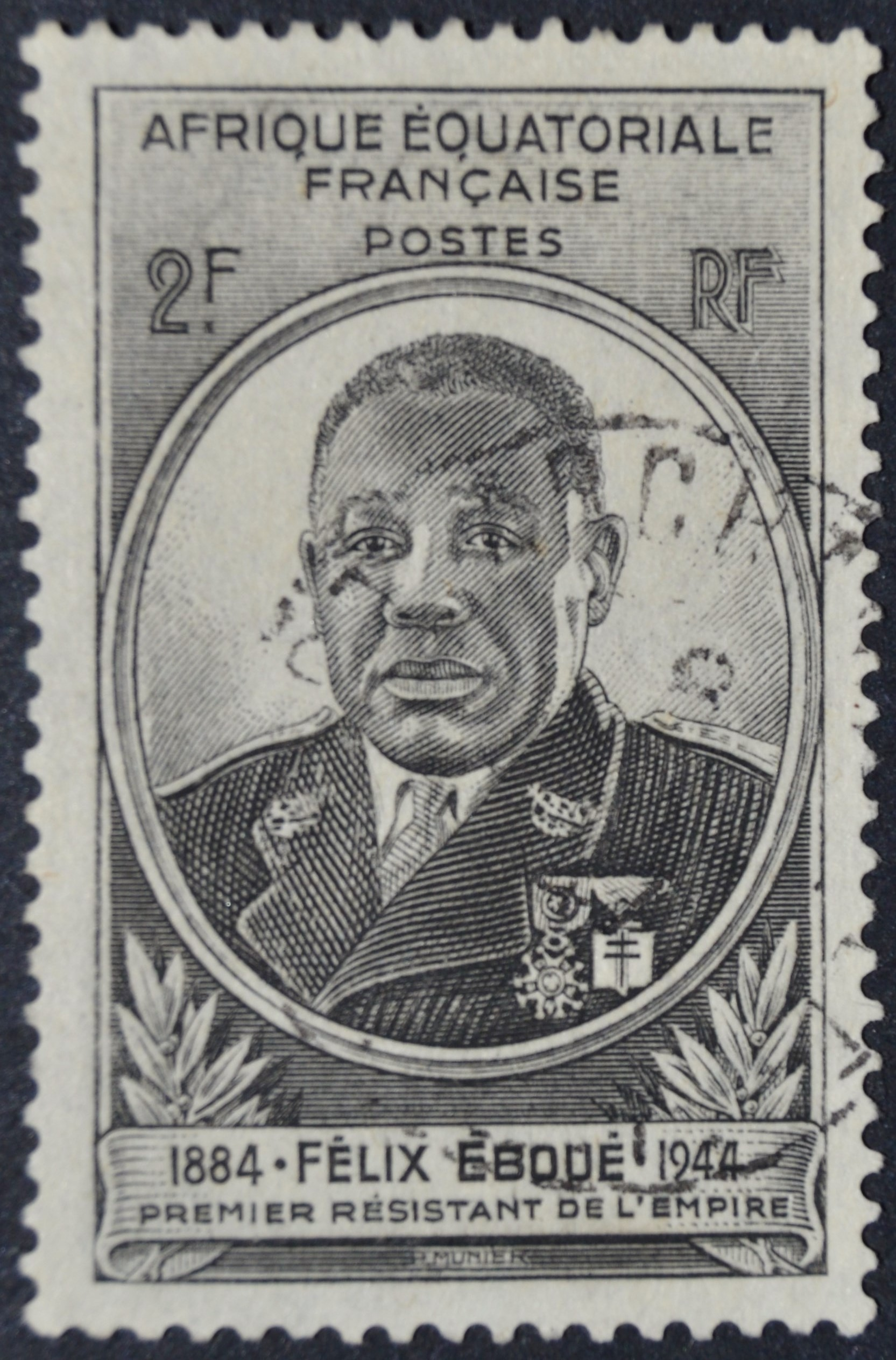
AEF 242 Felix Eboue 2f 1945
