= Yanick Lahens =

Haitian radio host and writer

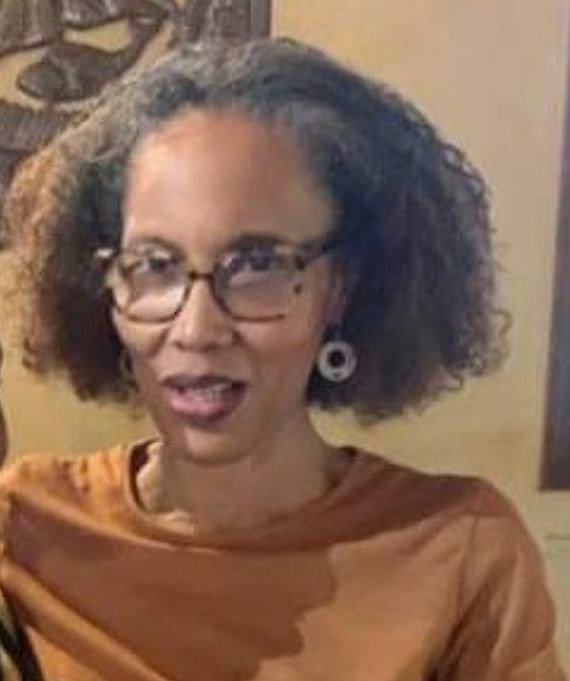
- Born: 22 December 1953 (age 72); Port-au-Prince
- Writing career
- Language: French, Haitian Creole
- Genres: novels, poetry
- Notable awards: Prix Femina laureate in 2014

Yanick Lahens (born 22 December 1953, Port-au-Prince) is a Haitian Francophone writer, novelist, teacher, and lecturer. She became a Prix Femina laureate in 2014. In 2025, the Académie Française awarded her novel Passagères de Nuit the Grand Prix du Roman de l'Académie Française.

== Biography ==
Born in Port-au-Prince, Lahens attended high school and university in France before returning to Haiti where she taught until 1995 at the University of Haiti. During the following two years, she served in the office of the Minister of Culture. In 1998, she led the project "Road to slavery". With Jan J. Dominique, Lahens hosts a radio talk show, "Entre Nous". She is affiliated with the Association of Haitian Writers, and is a contributor to Chemins critiques, Cultura and Boutures. Her first novel, Dans la maison du père, was published in 2000. In 2014, she received the Prix Femina for Bain de lune. Lahens plays an active role in the development of her country's culture.

== Selected works ==
- 1990, L'Exil : entre l'ancrage et la fuite, l'écrivain haïtien
- 1994, Tante Résia et les Dieux
- 2000, Dans la maison du père
- 2003, La Petite Corruption
- 2006, La folie était venue avec la pluie
- 2008, La Couleur de l'aube, Prix RFO du livre (2009)
- 2010, Failles
- 2013, Guillaume et Nathalie
- 2014, Bain de lune
- 2018, Douces déroutes
- 2025, Passagères de Nuit (ISBN 978-2-84805-570-1), Grand Prix du Roman de l'Académie Française.

== Awards ==
- 2002: LiBeraturpreis, Prix du Salon du livre de Leipzig
- 2008: Prix Millepages
- 2009: Prix RFO du livre
- 2014: Prix littéraire des Caraïbes de l'ADELF
- 2014: Prix Carbet des lycéens
- 2014: Prix Femina
- 2025: Le Grand Prix du Roman de l’Académie Française.
