= Prix RFO du livre =

French literary award

The prix RFO du livre was a French literary prize awarded annually from 1995 to 2010 by RFO to a Francophone work of fiction linked to French overseas departments and territories or surrounding geographical and geopolitical zones.

== List of rewarded works ==
- 1995: Nelly Schmidt. Victor Schœlcher. Fayard. ISBN 2706811900.
- 1996: Gisèle Pineau. L'Espérance-macadam. Stock. ISBN 2911207548.
- 1997: Ernest Pépin. Tambour-Babel. Éditions Gallimard. ISBN 2070744116.
- 1998: Raphaël Confiant. Le Meurtre du Samedi-Gloria. Mercure de France. ISBN 2-07-041072-2.
- 1999: Louis-Philippe Dalembert. L'Autre face de la mer. Stock. ISBN 2753800146.
- 2000: Roland Brival. Biguine Blues. Éditions Phébus. ISBN 285940581X.
- 2001: Anouar Benmalek. L'Enfant du peuple ancien. Jean-Jacques Pauvert. ISBN 2253154326.
- 2002: Dany Laferrière. Cette grenade dans la main du jeune nègre est-elle une arme ou un fruit ?. Le Serpent à plumes. ISBN 2842614496.
- 2003: Nathacha Appanah. Les Rochers de Poudre d'or. Gallimard. ISBN 2070767248.
- 2004: Gary Victor. Je sais quand Dieu vient se promener dans mon jardin. Vents d'ailleurs. ISBN 2911412265.
- 2005: Alain Mabanckou. Verre cassé. Éditions du Seuil. ISBN 2020849534.
- 2006: Ananda Devi. Ève de ses décombres. Gallimard. ISBN 2070776182.
- 2007: Fabienne Kanor. Humus. Gallimard. ISBN 2070780856.
- 2008: Patrick Chamoiseau. Un dimanche au cachot. Gallimard. ISBN 9782070765157.
- 2009: Yanick Lahens. La Couleur de l'aube. Sabine Wespieser. ISBN 9782848050638.
- 2010: Mohammed Aïssaoui. L'Affaire de l'esclave Furcy. Gallimard. ISBN 978-2070128679.
