= Marie-Reine de Jaham =

French writer

Marie-Reine de Jaham (born February 7, 1940) is a Martiniquais writer.

Descended from French planters, she is the granddaughter of Victor Depaz and the first cousin twice removed of Joséphine de Beauharnais. At the age of 17, she married and moved with her husband to the United States. There, she began a career in advertising in New York City; she later moved to Paris, where she founded her own agency. In 1990, she established a Creole cultural association, Le Patrimoine Créole. She is considered one of the best-informed experts on Creole culture. de Jaham moved to Nice in 2000. There, she established the Cercle Méditerranée Caraïbe with the aim of establishing links between the Mediterranean region and the Caribbean.

In 1989, she published her first novel La Grande Béké, which became a bestseller and was adapted for television in 1998. In 1991, she published a second novel Le Maître-savane which continued the story begun in her first novel.

In 1996, de Jaham was named a Chevalier in the French Ordre des Arts et des Lettres. She was promoted officer in january 2013

== Selected works ==
- Les desserts créoles et leur complice le sucre de canne, cook book (1992)
- L’Or des îles (1996), Le Sang du volcan (1997), Les Héritiers du paradis. (1998): trilogy, the first volume received the Prix Arc-en-ciel and the first two volumes received the Prix littéraire des Caraïbes from the Association des écrivains de langue française
- Bwa bandé, novel (1999)
- Le Sortilège des marassa, novel (2001)
- La cuisine créole de Da Doudou, cook book (2004)
- La Véranda créole, novel (2005)
- a Caravelle Liberté, novel (2007)
