= Morne-à-l'Eau =

- Commune
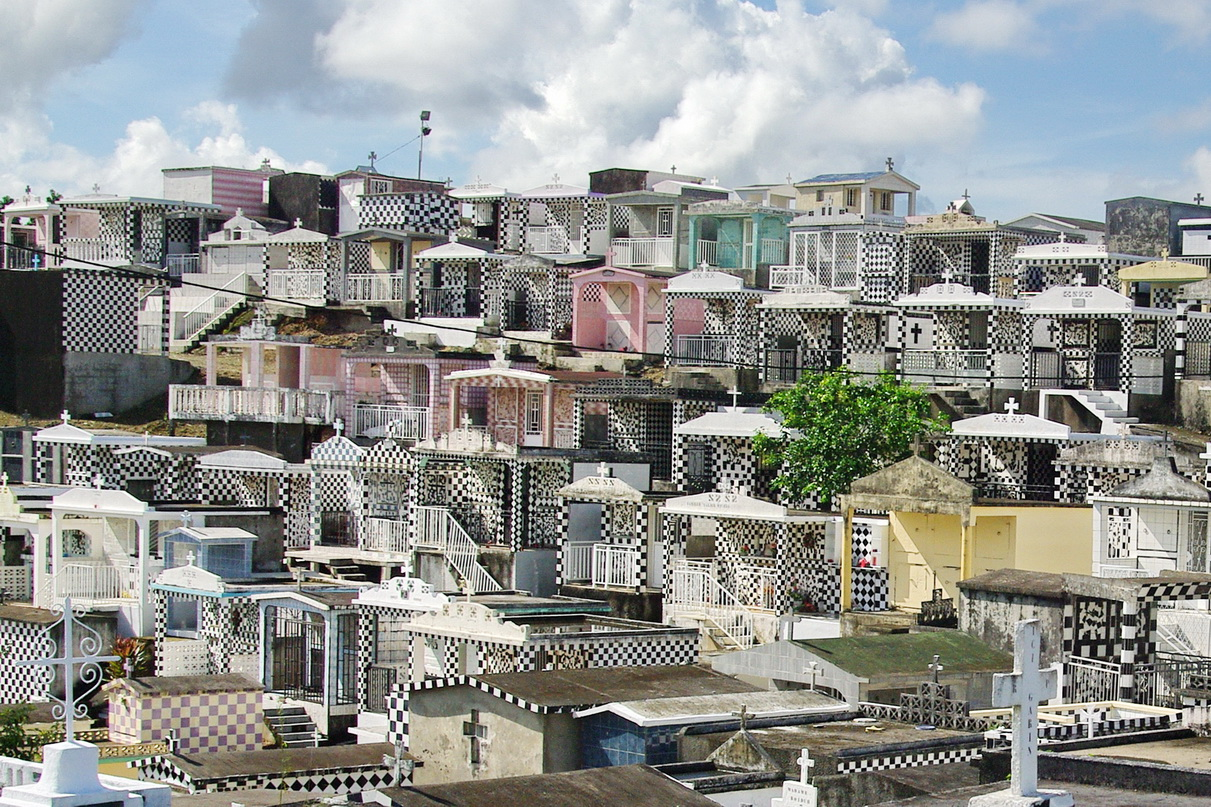
- The cemetery of Morne-à-l'Eau

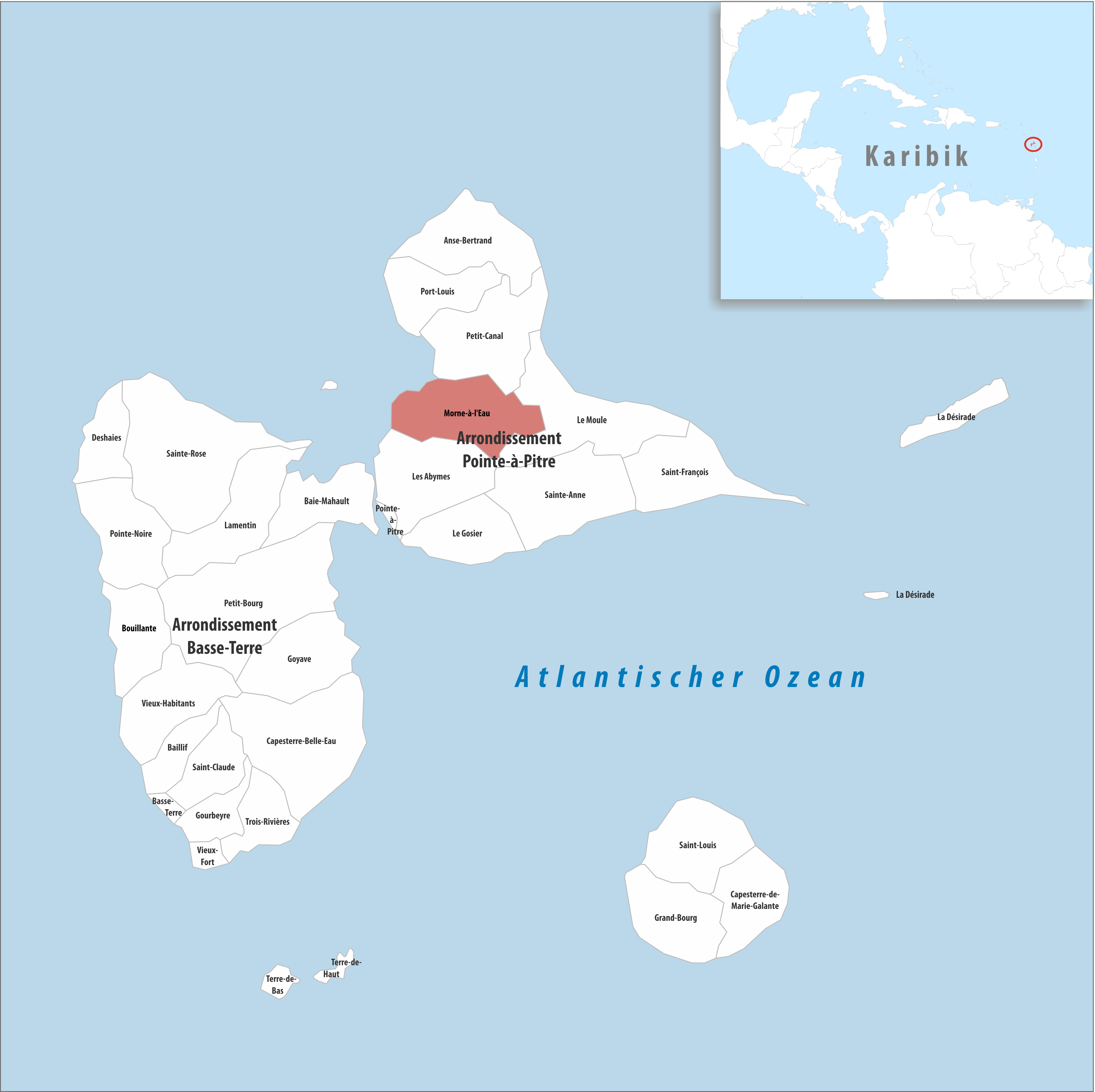
- Location of the commune (in red) within Guadeloupe
- Location of Morne-à-l'Eau
- Coordinates: 16°19′56″N 61°27′25″W
- Country: France
- Overseas region and department: Guadeloupe
- Arrondissement: Pointe-à-Pitre
- Canton: Morne-à-l'Eau
- Intercommunality: CA Nord Grande-Terre

Government
  - Mayor (2020–2026): Jean Bardail
- Area^{1}: 64.50 km^{2} (24.90 sq mi)
- Population (2023): 16,228
  - Density: 251.6/km^{2} (651.6/sq mi)
- Time zone: UTC−04:00 (AST)
- INSEE/Postal code: 97116 /97111
- ^{1} French Land Register data, which excludes lakes, ponds, glaciers > 1 km^{2} (0.386 sq mi or 247 acres) and river estuaries.

Morne-à-l'Eau (French pronunciation: [mɔʁn a lo]; Créole Guadeloupéen: Monalo) is a commune located in the department of Guadeloupe.

== Events ==
In March or April each year since 1993, the town organises a crab festival which features crab races and many stalls selling crab-based dishes. In 2008 the event's 18th edition attracted over 20,000 visitors and included a Brazilian music plus a cycle-race passing through the already congested town.

== Hamlets ==
Béguette, Berlette, Blanchette, Boisvin, Bosrédon, Belle-Espérance, Blain, Blanchet, Bonne-Terre, Le Bourg (Grippon), Brion, Bubelloy, Chastel, Chaumette, Chazeau, Chevalier, Chouioutte, Clugny, Cocoyer, Croustère, Dubelloy, Dubisquet, Espérance, Geffrier, Gensolin, Lemesle, Lola, Jabrun, Jabrun-Saint-Cyr, Labuthie, Lasserre, Lebraire, Marchand, Marieulle, Perrin, Pierrefite, Point-à-Retz, Quirine, Réduit, Rousseau, Richeval, Salette, Sauvia, Vieux-Bourg, et Zabeth.

== Population ==
Historical population
Year	Pop.	±% p.a.
1967	14,925	—
1974	15,034	+0.10%
1982	13,724	−1.13%
1990	16,042	+1.97%
1999	17,154	+0.75%
2007	16,875	−0.20%
2012	16,959	+0.10%
2017	17,434	+0.55%
2023	16,228	−1.19%
Source: INSEE

== Politics ==
List of Mayors
From	To	Elected	Party / Electoral Alliance
1912	1947	Justin Archimède	RR
1947	1970	Pierre Monnerville	SFIO → FGPS (Fédération guadeloupéenne du Parti socialiste)
1970	1973	Marie-Émile (Paul) Coco	
1973	1989	Abdon Saman	DVD → UDF
1989	1895	Favrot Davrain	DVD → FGPS (Fédération guadeloupéenne du Parti socialiste)
1995	2005	Julien Chovino	PCG
2005	2016	Jean-Claude Lombion	PCG → DVG
2016	2020	Philipson Francfort	DVG
2020	2026	Jean Bardail	

== Education ==
Public preschools include:

- Ecole maternelle Jeanne Benin Morne -à -l'eau
- Ecole maternelle Edouard Nelson
- Ecole maternelle Pointe A Retz
- Ecole maternelle Bazile Bertaux Vieux-Bourg

Public primary schools include:

- Ecole primaire Labuthie Achille
- Ecole primaire Marcelle Blanchinet
- Ecole primaire Hyppolite Cocles
- Ecole primaire Félix Duport
- Ecole primaire Coco Marie Emilie
- Ecole primaire Ludger Marie
- Ecole primaire Ernest Pallas

Public elementary schools include:

- Ecole élémentaire Pierre Foucan Morne-à-l'eau

Public junior high schools include:

- Collège Charles de Gaulle

Public senior high schools include:

- LGT Faustin Fleret
- LP Gerty Archimede

== Sports ==
It is home to L'Etoile de Morne-à-l'Eau, a football team who have won the Coupe D.O.M.

== Notable people ==
- Gerty Archimède (1909–1980), politician and lawyer.
- Éric Danty (1947–2020), football player.
- Victoire Jasmin (born 1955), senator

== See also ==
- Jabrun, Guadeloupe
- Communes of Guadeloupe
