= Anouar Benmalek =

Algerian journalist and mathematician

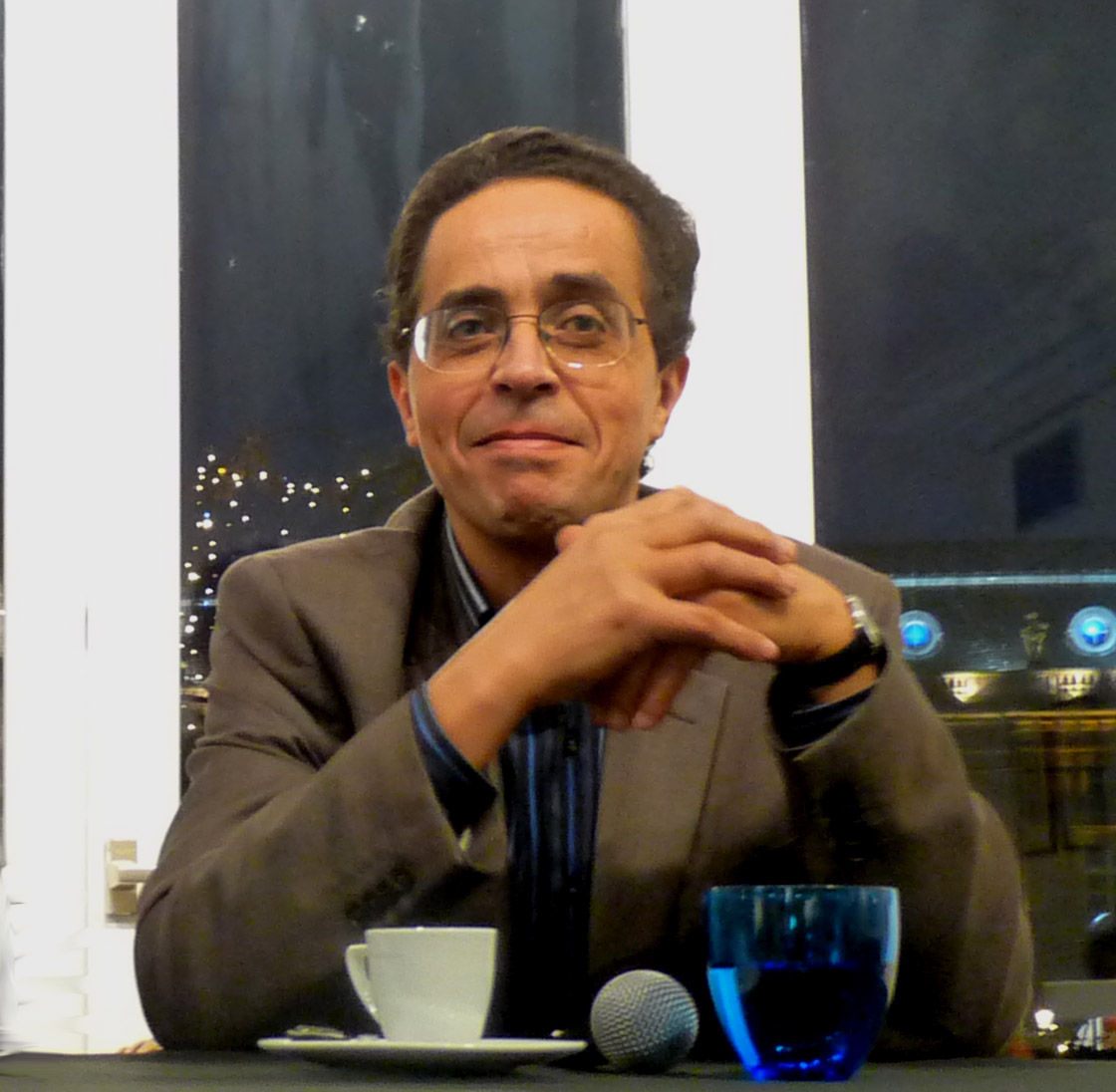
Anouar Benmalek

Anouar Benmalek (born January 16, 1956) is an Algerian novelist, journalist, mathematician and poet. After the 1988 riots in Algeria in protest of government policies, he became one of the founders of the Algerian Committee Against Torture. His novel Lovers of Algeria was awarded the Prix Ragid. The novel, The Child of an Ancient People, won the Prix RFO du livre.

Benmalek's work has been described as "elegiac, multilayered meditation on Algeria's violent history." He has been compared to Camus and Faulkner.

He was born in Casablanca to an Algerian father and a Moroccan mother.

== Works ==
- Cortèges d'impatiences, poetry, Éd. Naaman, 1984, Québec
- La Barbarie, essay, Éd. Enal, 1986, Algiers
- Rakesh, Vishnou et les autres nouvelles, Éd. Enal, 1985, Algiers
- Ludmila, novel, Éd. Enal, 1986, Algiers
- Les amants désunis, novel, Éd. Calmann-Lévy, 1998, Paris; Éd. Livre de Poche, 2000; Prix Mimouni 1999 (translated into 10 languages, sélections Fémina et Médicis).
- L'enfant du peuple ancien, novel, Jean-Jacques Pauvert, August 2000, Paris; Ed. Livre de Poche, 2002; Prix des auditeurs de la RTBF (Radio Télévision Belge) 2001, Prix RFO du livre 2001, Prix BeurFM-Méditerranée 2001, Prix Millepages 2000 (sélection Fémina, sélection rentrée littéraire 2000 Libraires et lecteurs de la Fnac, sélection du journal Le Soir de Bruxelles, sélection France Télévision, sélection Côté Femmes... translated into 8 languages)
- L'amour Loup, novel, Éd. Pauvert, February 2002, Éd. Livre de Poche, 2004, Paris
- Chroniques de l'Algérie amère, Éd. Pauvert, January 2003, Paris
- Ce jour viendra, novel, Éd Pauvert, September 2003
- Ma planète me monte à la tête, poetry, Fayard, January 2005
- L'année de la putain, shioet stories, Fayard, 2006
- Ô Maria, novel, Fayard, 2006
- Vivre pour écrire, interviews, Éd. Sedia, February 2007
- Le Rapt, novel, Fayard, 2009 (translated into Italian, Il rapimento, Atmosphere libri, 2014)
- Tu ne mourras plus demain, narration, Fayard, 2011
- Fils du Sheol, novel, Calmann-Levy, 2015

=== Collective works ===
- Une journée d'été, Éd. Librio, 2000
- Étrange mon étranger, Seloncourt, 2001
- Ma langue est mon territoire, Éd. Eden, 2001
- Nouvelles d'aujourd'hui, Éd. Écoute, Spotlight Verlag, 2001
- Contre offensive, Éd. Pauvert, 2002
- Lettres de ruptures, Éd. Pocket, 2002
- Des nouvelles d'Algérie, Éd. Métailié, 2005
- Le Tour du Mont en 80 pages, Les Lettres européennes, 2005
- Nouvelles d'Algérie, Éd. Magellan, 2009
- Les Enfants de la balle, Éd. Lattès, 2010
- Algérie 50, Éd. Magellan, 2012
