= Gerty Archimède =

Guadeloupean politician (1909–1980)

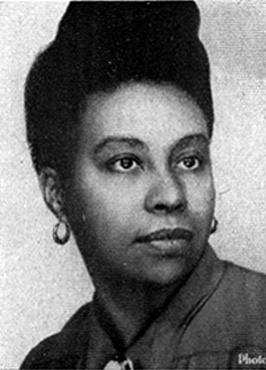

National Assembly
- In office 1946–1951
- Constituency: Guadeloupe

Personal details
- Born: Gerty Marie Bernadette Archimède; 26 April 1909; Morne-a-l'Eau, Guadeloupe
- Died: 15 April 1980 (aged 70); Morne-a-l'Eau, Guadeloupe
- Political party: French Communist Party (PCF)
- Occupation: Politician, lawyer

Gerty Archimède (April 26, 1909 – April 15, 1980) was a politician from Guadeloupe who served in the French National Assembly from 1946 to 1951. She was the first female lawyer to pass the Guadeloupe Bar and the second black woman elected to the French National Assembly, shortly after Eugénie Éboué-Tell.

Archimède was a lawyer, prominent member of the Parti Communiste Guadeloupeen (PCG), founder and president of the Union des Femmes Guadeloupeennes, and conseiller général from Basse-Terre, Guadeloupe.

== Biography ==
The oldest of five children in the family, Gerty was the daughter of Justin Archimède, who was elected Mayor of Morne-à-l'eau in 1923. A Guadeloupean lawyer, she was the first woman to become a member of the Guadeloupe bar in 1939.

She had an active political career. In 1945, she was elected Departmental Councillor on the Social-Communist Proletarian group list before being elected as deputy of Guadeloupe as a PCF (French Communist Party) group member from November 10, 1946, until April 17, 1951. She has been with Eugenie Eboué-Tell, one of the two first women deputies in Guadeloupe. In 1948, she became a member of the French Communist Party, which designated her as its representative in numerous conferences throughout the world.

In 1952, she returned to the bar in Guadeloupe and was elected in 1953 as Deputy of Basse-Terre Mayor, Elie Chauferain, whilst continuing her activity as a lawyer, until she replaced him in 1956.

Feminist activist, she created in Guadeloupe a federation of the Union of French Women: UFF (Union des Femmes Françaises, close to the PCF) to support her effort to obtain the enforcement of social security and retirement rights for women in Guadeloupe. She contributed actively to the transformation of the UFF federation into the Union of Guadeloupean Women (Union des Femmes Guadeloupéennes)

In August 1969, she met Angela Davis after arriving in Basse-Terre from Cuba by boat. Davis and her friends were arrested by French customs officers and had their passports confiscated, and this encounter was mentioned in Angela Davis' autobiography.

== Tributes ==
The Gerty Archimède Museum (French: Musée Gerty Archimède) is located at 27 Maurice Marie Street in Basse-Terre.

A bronze statue was inaugurated in her memory on 13 December 2002 on the maritime boulevard of Basse-Terre.

The Gerty Archimède street (rue Gerty Archimède) in the Paris 12th Arrondissement was named after her in 2006, following a request from the communist elected representatives of Paris.

In 2006, her nephew Alain Foix wrote a play, Pas de prison pour le vent (No prison for wind), inspired by her encounter with Angela Davis in Guadeloupe.

On 27 January 2007, Ségolène Royal paid tribute to her during her election campaign.

On 14 January 2011, during the inauguration of a new amphitheater at the UAG in the city of Saint-Claude, the jury revealed the results after a referendum, announcing that Gerty Archimède would be the Caribbean personality the building would be named after.

== See also ==
- First women lawyers around the world
