= Pierre Monnerville =

Politician from French Guiana

Pierre Monnerville (24 February 1895 in Cayenne, French Guiana – 6 September 1970 in Les Abymes, Guadeloupe) was a politician from French Guiana who belonged to the French Section of the Workers' International (SFIO) and served and represented Guadeloupe in the French National Assembly from 1956 to 1967. He was the mayor of Morne-à-l'Eau from 1947 to 1970.

== Bibliography ==
- Monnerville's page on the French National Assembly website
