= Rosan Girard =

- Born: October 16, 1913; Le Moule, Gaudeloupe
- Died: June 5, 2001 (aged 87)
- Occupation: Politician
- Political party: French Communist Party

Rosan Girard (born 16 October 1913 in Le Moule, Guadeloupe; died 5 June 2001) was a politician from Guadeloupe who served in the French National Assembly from 1946 to 1958.

== Bibliography ==
- page on the French National Assembly website
