= Norton Parish, New Brunswick =

Norton Parish
- Parish
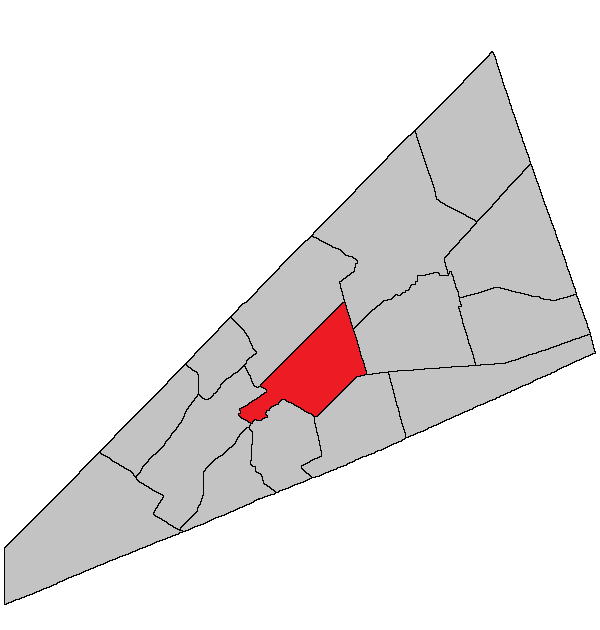
- Location within Kings County, New Brunswick.
- Coordinates: 45.84°N 64.59°W
- Country: Canada
- Province: New Brunswick
- County: Queens County
- Erected: 1795

Area
  - Land: 144.77 km^{2} (55.90 sq mi)

Population (2021)
  - Total: 1,325
  - Density: 9.2/km^{2} (24/sq mi)
  - Change 2016-2021: ▲1.8%
  - Dwellings: 550
- Time zone: UTC-4 (AST)
  - Summer (DST): UTC-3 (ADT)
- Figures do not include portions within the town of Hampton and the village of Norton

Norton is a geographic parish in Kings County, New Brunswick, Canada.

Prior to the 2023 governance reform, it was divided between the town of Hampton, the village of Norton, and the local service district of the parish of Norton, all of which were members of Kings Regional Service Commission (RSC8).

== Origin of name ==
Norton may have been named for Norton, Massachusetts, near Taunton, which was the original home of many of the first settlers to this area.

Notable is that the names of Kings County's pre-1800 parishes all occur in both New Jersey and North Carolina.

== History ==
Norton was erected in 1795 from Sussex Parish and Kingston Parish.

In 1844 the boundary with Kingston was adjusted.

Writer Emily Elizabeth Shaw Beavan worked in the parish as a young teacher.

== Boundaries ==
Norton Parish is bounded:

- on the west and northwest by a line beginning at the northern bank of the Kennebecasis River, on the western line of a grant to Freedom Burdock, then running northwesterly along the grant line to its westernmost corner, about 150 metres southwest of the Ketchum Road, then northeasterly along the rear line of grants along the Kennebecasis River, including a dogleg away from the river, until it reaches the northernmost corner of a grant to John & Peter Cable, about 1.3 kilometres northeast of Route 845 and near the northern bank of Pickwauket Brook, then northwesterly to the Rogers Road at a point 65 chains (1.3 kilometres) inland of and parallel to the rear line of a tier of grants on the south side of Belleisle Bay, then running northeasterly along the parallel and its prolongation until it meets the Studholm Parish line at Route 124;
- on the east by a line running north and south (Note: By the magnet of 1795, when declination in the area was between 15º and 16º west of north.) from the mouth of Halfway Brook on the Kennebecasis River, as far south as a point about 75 metres south of Byrnes Brook and 300 metres east-northeasterly of the Byrne Road;
- on the south by a line running generally southwesterly following the old Westmorland Road (Note: The old Westmorland Road was discontinued so long ago that it does not appear on the province's cadastral grant maps.) past the Passekeag Road, then northwesterly along the prolongation of the southwestern line and then the line of a grant to John Fritch on the southern side of the Kennebecasis River, then southwesterly along the river to the starting point.

== Communities ==
Communities at least partly within the parish; bold indicates an incorporated municipality; italics indicate a name no longer in official use

- Bloomfield (Bloomfield Station)
- Bloomfield Ridge
- Central Norton
- Dickie Mountain
- **Hampton**
- Lower Norton
- Passekeag
- Woodpecker Hall
- **Norton**
  - Mercer Settlement
  - Midland
  - Peekaboo Corner
  - Southfield Road
  - Upper Midland

== Bodies of water ==
Bodies of water (Note: Not including brooks, ponds or coves.) at least partly in the parish:

- Kennebecasis River
- Moosehorn Creek
- Passekeag Creek
- McManus Lake

== Demographics ==
Parish population total does not include Hampton and the village of Norton

=== Population ===
Population trend

Census	Population	Change (%)
2016	1,301	▲0.4%
2011	1,296	▲7.2%
2006	1,209	▲1.1%
2001	1,222	▲0.0%

=== Language ===
Mother tongue (2016)

Language	Population	Pct (%)
French only	35	2.7%
English only	1,240	95.4%
Both English and French	5	0.4%
Other languages	20	1.5%

== Access Routes ==
Highways and numbered routes that run through the parish, including external routes that start or finish at the parish limits:

- **Highways**
  - none
- **Principal Routes**
  - Route 121
  - Route 124
- Secondary Routes:
  - Route 855
  - Route 865
- External Routes:
  - None

== See also ==
- List of parishes in New Brunswick
