= Hampton Parish, New Brunswick =

Hampton
- Parish
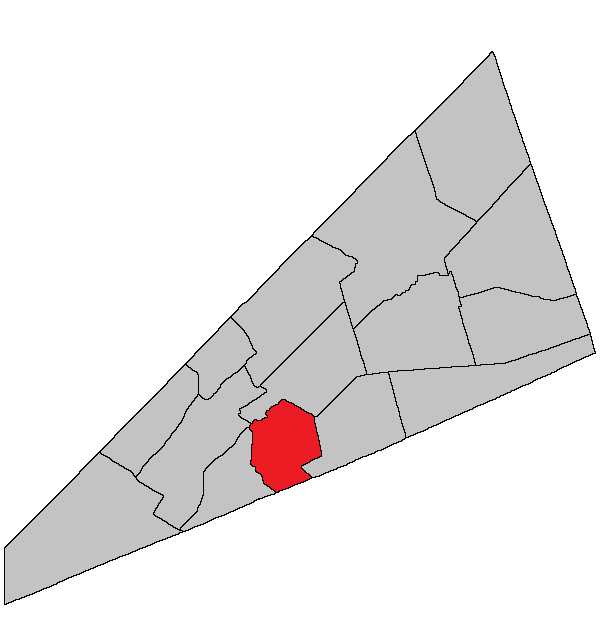
- Location within Kings County, New Brunswick.
- Coordinates: 45.84°N 64.59°W
- Country: Canada
- Province: New Brunswick
- County: Kings County
- Erected: 1795

Area
  - Land: 121.24 km^{2} (46.81 sq mi)

Population (2021)
  - Total: 2,969
  - Density: 24.5/km^{2} (63/sq mi)
  - Change 2016-2021: ▲5.7%
  - Dwellings: 1,216
- Time zone: UTC-4 (AST)
  - Summer (DST): UTC-3 (ADT)
- Figures do not include portions within the towns of Hampton and Quispamsis

Hampton is a geographic parish in Kings County, New Brunswick, Canada.

Prior to the 2023 governance reform, it was divided for governance purposes between the towns of Hampton and Quispamsis and the local service district of the parish of Hampton, which further included the service area of Fairmont Subdivision. Hampton and the LSD were members of Kings Regional Service Commission (RSC8), while Quispamsis was a member of the Fundy Regional Service Commission (FRSC).

== Origin of name ==
Ganong believed the name "perhaps" came from Hampton near London. The name was common in the Thirteen Colonies.

Notable is that the names of Kings County's pre-1800 parishes all occur in both New Jersey and North Carolina.

== History ==
Hampton was erected in 1795 from Sussex Parish and Kingston Parish. It included Rothesay and Upham Parishes.

In 1835 Upham was erected as its own parish.

In 1870 Rothesay was erected as its own parish.

In 1873 the boundary with Rothesay was altered, specifying the path through the islands in the river and changing the mainland portion to follow grant lines rather than the road to Golden Grove.

In 1897 the boundary with Upham was altered.

== Boundaries ==
Hampton Parish is bounded:

- on the northwest by the Kennebecasis River;
- on the east by a line beginning on the Kennebecasis at the northernmost corner of a grant to John Fritch, then running southeasterly along the northeastern line of the Fritch grant and its prolongation to the old Westmorland Road, (Note: The old Westmorland Road was discontinued so long ago that it does not appear on the province's cadastral grant maps.) at a point about 150 metres west-southwest of Passekeag Road, then southwesterly to a point about 300 metres east of the Cumberland Road and about 900 metres south of its junction with the Passekeag Road, then south-southeasterly along a line through the northeastern corner of a grant to James Beyea to the northeastern corner a grant to J. C. Robertson, then slightly more easterly along the easterly line of the Robertson grant to the Hammond River, then downriver about 300 metres to where the eastern line of a grant to William Scoullar strikes the Hammond, then southerly along the Scoullar grant to the northeastern corner of a grant to Robert Godfrey, about 825 metres south of an s-shaped meander of the Hammond, then west-southwesterly along the prolongation of the northern line of a grant to Thomas Smith to the northwestern corner of the Smith grant, then southeasterly to the Saint John County line;
- on the south by the Saint John County line;
- on the west by a line beginning on the county line at a point about 600 metres west-northwest of the junction of First Lake Road and Sands Road, on the northeastern line of a grant to Samuel Storms, then running northwesterly along the grant line to its northeastern corner, then westerly along the rear line about 300 metres, then left at a 90º angle to run north-northwesterly parallel to the eastern line of a grant to Zephaniah Kingsley to strike the Hammond River about 675 metres upriver of Route 1, then downstream past the Canadian National Railway bridge to strike the southern shore of an island, then north-northeasterly along the line dividing grants on either side of the Hammond River, through two islands, then along the eastern channel of the Hammond, passing west of Darlings Island, until it strikes the Kennebecasis.

== Communities ==
Communities at least partly within the parish; bold indicates an incorporated municipality

- Bonney Road
- Damascus
- French Village
- **Hampton**
  - Hampton Station
  - Lakeside
- Mount Prospect
- Nauwigewauk
- **Quispamsis**
- Smithtown
- Titusville
- Woodpecker Hall

== Bodies of water ==
Bodies of water (Note: Not including brooks, ponds or coves.) at least partly in the parish:

- Hammond River
- Kennebecasis River
- Ossekeag Creek
- Passekeag Creek
- Third Lake Thoroughfare
- Brawley Lake
- Darlings Lake
- McManus Lake
- Terreo Lake
- Third Lake

== Islands ==
Islands at least partly in the parish.

- Darlings Island
- Spoon Island

== Demographics ==
Parish population total does not include portions within the town of Hampton and Quispamsis

=== Population ===
Population trend

Census	Population	Change (%)
2016	2,809	▲2.7%
2011	2,734	▲0.4%
2006	2,724	▲1.1%

=== Language ===
Mother tongue (2016)

Language	Population	Pct (%)
English only	2,635	93.9%
French only	105	3.7%
Both English and French	10	0.4%
Other languages	55	2.0%

== Access Routes ==
Highways and numbered routes that run through the parish, including external routes that start or finish at the parish limits:

- **Highways**
  - Route 1
- **Principal Routes**
  - Route 100
  - Route 121
- Secondary Routes:
  - Route 845
  - Route 860
- External Routes:
  - None

== See also ==
- List of parishes in New Brunswick
