= Sussex Parish, New Brunswick =

Sussex
- Parish
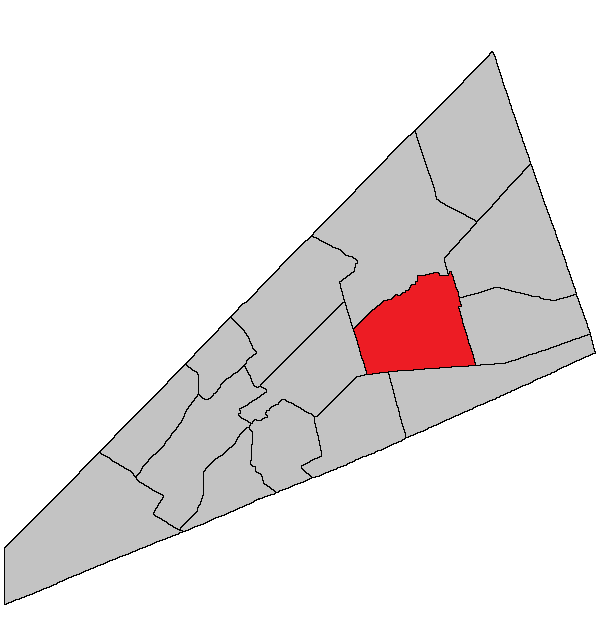
- Location within Kings County, New Brunswick.
- Coordinates: 45.84°N 64.59°W
- Country: Canada
- Province: New Brunswick
- County: Kings County
- Erected: 1786

Area
  - Land: 243.99 km^{2} (94.21 sq mi)

Population (2021)
  - Total: 2,579
  - Density: 10.6/km^{2} (27/sq mi)
  - Change 2016-2021: ▲2.5%
  - Dwellings: 1,094
- Time zone: UTC-4 (AST)
  - Summer (DST): UTC-3 (ADT)
- Figures do not include portions within the town of Sussex and the village of Sussex Corner

Sussex is a geographic parish in Kings County, New Brunswick, Canada.

Prior to the 2023 governance reform, it was divided for governance purposes between the town of Sussex, the village of Sussex Corner, and the local service district of the parish of Sussex (which further included the special service area of Apohaqui), all of which were members of Kings Regional Service Commission (RSC8).

== Origin of name ==
Historian William Francis Ganong noted that Sussex, New Jersey was a Loyalist stronghold and that members of a New Jersey regiment settled in the area. The fact that the names of the four original parishes and two 1795 parishes of Kings County are all found in New Jersey is also mentioned.

The Duke of Sussex origin noted elsewhere is problematic, as he didn't hold that title until 1801.

Notable is that the names of Kings County's pre-1800 parishes all occur in both New Jersey and North Carolina.

== History ==
Sussex was erected in 1786 as one of the original parishes of the county, stretching from Kennebecasis Bay to the eastern line of the county, which then was north of St. Martins.

In 1787 a large area was added to Sussex when the county's eastern boundary was moved significantly eastward to run due north and south from the portage between the Petitcodiac and Kennebecasis Rivers.

In the 1795 reorganisation of the county the western part of Sussex formed the bulk of Hampton Parish. By this time Sussex included Cardwell, Havelock, Studholm, and Waterford Parishes.

In 1837 the eastern boundary of the county was altered, adding area to the southeastern corner of Sussex and removing it from the northeastern corner.

In 1840 Studholm was erected as its own parish, including Havelock.

In 1874 Cardwell and Waterford became parishes.

In 1875 the boundary with Hammond Parish was altered.

== Boundaries ==
Sussex Parish is bounded:

- on the north by the Kennebecasis River;
- on the east by a line beginning at the Kennebecasis River, about one kilometre east of Plumweseep Road and about 900 metres north-northwesterly of Route 114, then running south-southeasterly along the prolongation of the eastern line of a large grant to Elias Snyder on the north side of Trout Creek, the line being about 75 metres east of the end of Taverner Road, to Trout Creek, then downstream about 500 metres to the eastern line of a grant to Cornelius Parlee, then south-southeasterly to the southern line of the parish about one kilometre east of the Londonderry Road;
- on the south by a line running westerly from a point in Waterford Parish about 450 metres south of the southern tip of Walton Lake and about 150 metres west of the Creek Road to a point about 825 metres north of Cassidy Lake near its western end, then westerly to a point about 75 metres south of Byrnes Brook and 300 metres east-northeasterly of the Byrne Road;
- on the west by a line running north (Note: By the magnet of 1795, when declination in the area was between 15º and 16º west of north.) from the southern line of the parish to a point on the Kennebecasis River opposite the mouth of Halfway Brook.

== Communities ==
Communities at least partly within the parish. bold indicates an incorporated municipality

- Apohaqui
- Campbell Settlement
- Drurys Cove
- Erb Settlement
- Jeffries Corner
- Lisson Settlement
- Lower Cove
- Markhamville
- McCain Settlement
- New Line Road
- Poodiac
- Ratter Corner
- Riverbank
- Rockville
- Southfield
- **Sussex**
- **Sussex Corner**
  - Dutch Valley
- Upper Wards Creek
- Vinegar Hill
- Wards Creek

== Bodies of water ==
Bodies of water (Note: Not including brooks, ponds or coves.) at least partly within the parish.

- Hammond River
- Kennebecasis River
- Trout Creek
- Wards Creek
- DeCourcey Lake

== Other notable places ==
Parks, historic sites, and other noteworthy places at least partly within the parish.

- Sussex Aerodrome

== Demographics ==
Parish population total does not include the municipalities of Sussex and Sussex Corner

=== Population ===
Population trend

Census	Population	Change (%)
2016	2,516	▼0.5%
2011	2,529	▲4.2%
2006	2,427	▼5.2%
2001	2,560	▲0.0%

=== Language ===
Mother tongue (2016)

Language	Population	Pct (%)
English only	2,420	96.2%
French only	50	2.0%
Both English and French	10	0.4%
Other languages	35	1.4%

== Access Routes ==
Highways and numbered routes that run through the parish, including external routes that start or finish at the parish limits:

- **Highways**
  - Route 1
  - Route 10
- **Principal Routes**
  - Route 111
  - Route 114
  - Route 121
- Secondary Routes:
  - Route 865
  - Route 880
  - Route 890
- External Routes:
  - None

== See also ==
- List of parishes in New Brunswick
