= Upham Parish, New Brunswick =

Upham
- Parish
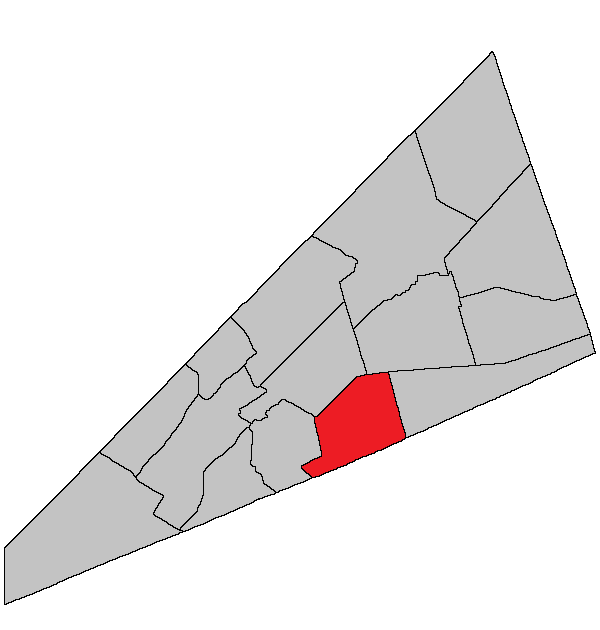
- Location within Kings County, New Brunswick.
- Coordinates: 45.84°N 64.59°W
- Country: Canada
- Province: New Brunswick
- County: Kings County
- Erected: 1835

Area
  - Land: 189.21 km^{2} (73.05 sq mi)

Population (2021)
  - Total: 1,357
  - Density: 7.2/km^{2} (19/sq mi)
  - Change 2016-2021: ▲6.9%
  - Dwellings: 586
- Time zone: UTC-4 (AST)
  - Summer (DST): UTC-3 (ADT)

Upham is a geographic parish in Kings County, New Brunswick, Canada.

Prior to the 2023 governance reform, it formed the local service district of the parish of Upham, which was a member of Kings Regional Service Commission (RSC8).

== Origin of name ==
The parish was probably named in honour of Joshua Upham, Loyalist military commander and later judge on the Supreme Court of New Brunswick. Members of the Upham family settled in the area after Joshua's death.

== History ==
Upham was erected in 1835 from Hampton Parish. It included Hammond Parish.

In 1858 Hammond was erected as its own parish.

The parish's boundary was rewritten in 1897, probably causing some change.

== Boundaries ==
Upham Parish is bounded:

- on the north by a line beginning at a point about 300 metres east of the Cumberland Road and about 900 metres south of its junction with the Passekeag Road, then running generally northeasterly along the old Westmorland Road (Note: The old Westmorland Road was discontinued so long ago that it does not appear on the province's cadastral grant maps.) to a point about 75 metres south of Byrnes Brook and 300 metres east-northeasterly of the Byrne Road, then easterly to a point about 825 metres north of the western end of Cassidy Lake at the prolongation of the eastern line of a grant to Samuel Deforest;
- on the east by the prolongation of the eastern line of the Deforest grant, the grant line itself, which runs along a straight stretch of Route 865, and the southern prolongation of the grant line to the Saint John County line;
- on the south by the Saint John County line;
- on the west by a line beginning where the western line of a grant to Thomas Smith strikes the county line, west of the junction of Third Lake Road and Route 820, then running northwesterly to the rear of the Smith grant, east-northeasterly along the rear line of the grant and its prolongation to the northeastern corner of a grant to Robert Godfrey, about 825 metres south of an s-shaped meander of the Hammond River, then northerly along the eastern line of a grant to William Scoullar, including along the outside of the southern bend of the meander, to the end of the eastern line at the river, then upriver about 300 metres to the western line of a grant to J. C. Robertson, then north-northwesterly along the Robertson grant to its northeastern corner, then very slightly more northerly in a direct line through the northeastern corner of a grant to James Beyea to the starting point.

== Governance ==
The entire parish formed the local service district of the parish of Upham, established in 1967 to assess for fire protection. Recreational and sports facilities were added in 2005. First aid and ambulance services (1976–2005) were formerly included.

== Communities ==
Communities at least partly within the parish; italics indicate a name no longer in official use

- Barnesville
- Bloomfield Ridge
- Clover Hill
- Salina
- Salt Springs
- Titus Mills
- Upham
- Upper Salt Springs
- Upperton

== Bodies of water ==
Bodies of water (Note: Not including brooks, ponds or coves.) at least partly in the parish:

- Hammond River
- South Stream

== Demographics ==
=== Population ===
Population trend

Census	Population	Change (%)
2016	1,269	▼2.8%
2011	1,306	▲3.1%
2006	1,267	▲1.1%
2001	1,303	▼2.8%

=== Language ===
Mother tongue (2016)

Language	Population	Pct (%)
English only	1,255	96.9%
French only	30	2.3%
Both English and French	5	0.4%
Other languages	5	0.4%

== Access Routes ==
Highways and numbered routes that run through the parish, including external routes that start or finish at the parish limits:

- Highways
  - none
- Principal Routes
  - Route 111
- Secondary Routes:
  - Route 820
  - Route 860
  - Route 865
- External Routes:
  - None

== See also ==
- List of parishes in New Brunswick
