= Hammond Parish, New Brunswick =

Hammond
- Parish
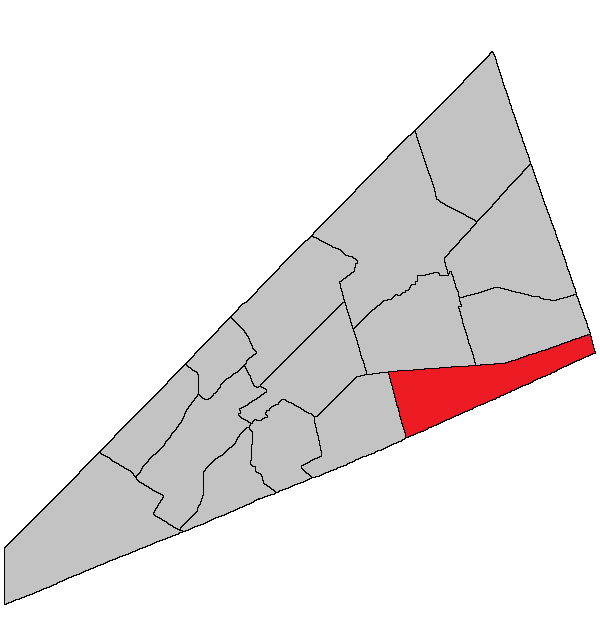
- Location within Kings County, New Brunswick.
- Coordinates: 45.84°N 64.59°W
- Country: Canada
- Province: New Brunswick
- County: Kings County
- Erected: 1858

Area
  - Land: 244.24 km^{2} (94.30 sq mi)

Population (2021)
  - Total: 276
  - Density: 1.1/km^{2} (2.8/sq mi)
  - Change 2016-2021: ▲10.0%
  - Dwellings: 159
- Time zone: UTC-4 (AST)
  - Summer (DST): UTC-3 (ADT)

Hammond is a geographic parish in Kings County, New Brunswick, Canada.

Prior to the 2023 governance reform, it comprised a single local service district, which was a member of Kings Regional Service Commission (RSC8).

== Origin of name ==
The parish was named for the Hammond River, which in turn took its name from Sir Andrew Snape Hamond, former Governor of Nova Scotia, who received a land grant on the river in 1787.

== History ==
Hammond was erected in 1858 from the eastern part of Upham Parish.

In 1875 the boundary with Sussex and Waterford Parishes was adjusted.

== Boundaries ==
Hammond Parish is bounded:

- on the north by a line beginning at a point 825 metres north of the western end of Cassidy Lake at the prolongation of the eastern line of a grant to Samuel Deforest southwest of the lake, then easterly in a direct line to the northeastern corner of a grant to William Thompson, about 450 metres south of the southern tip of Walton Lake and about 150 metres west of the Creek Road, then running south 88º east (Note: By the magnet of 1875, when declination in the area was about 21º west of north.) to a point on the Albert County line about 1.65 kilometres south-southeast from Route 114;
- on the east by the Albert County line;
- on the south by the Saint John County line;
- on the west by the eastern line of the Deforest grant, part of which runs along a straight stretch of Route 865, prolonged southerly to the Saint John County line and northerly to the starting point.

== Governance ==
The entire parish forms the local service district of the parish of Hammond, established in 1968 to assess for fire protection. First aid and ambulance services were added to the assessment in 1972. Recreational facilities were added to the assessment in 1994, with first aid and ambulance services being removed at the same time.

== Communities ==
Communities at least partly within the parish;

- Devine Corner
- Hammondvale
- Hillsdale
- Londonderry
- Poodiac

== Bodies of water ==
Bodies of water (Note: Not including brooks, ponds or coves.) at least partly in the parish:

- Big Salmon River
- Hammond River
- Little Salmon River
- Point Wolfe River
- Quiddy River
- Cassidy Lake
- more than a dozen other officially named lakes

== Other notable places ==
Parks, historic sites, and other noteworthy places at least partly in the parish.

- Fundy National Park
- McManus Hill Protected Natural Area
- Point Wolfe River Gorge Protected Natural Area
- Saddleback Brook Protected Natural Area

== Demographics ==
=== Population ===
Population trend

Census	Population	Change (%)
2016	251	▼14.9%
2011	295	▼13.0%
2006	339	▲17.3%
2001	289	Steady

=== Language ===
Mother tongue (2016)

Language	Population	Pct (%)
English only	245	98.0%
French only	5	2.0%
Both English and French	0	0%
Other languages	0	0%

== Access Routes ==
Highways and numbered routes that run through the parish, including external routes that start or finish at the parish limits:

- Highways
  - Route 111
- Principal Routes
  - None
- Secondary Routes:
  - Route 865
- External Routes:
  - None

== See also ==
- List of parishes in New Brunswick
