= Waterford Parish, New Brunswick =

Waterford
- Parish
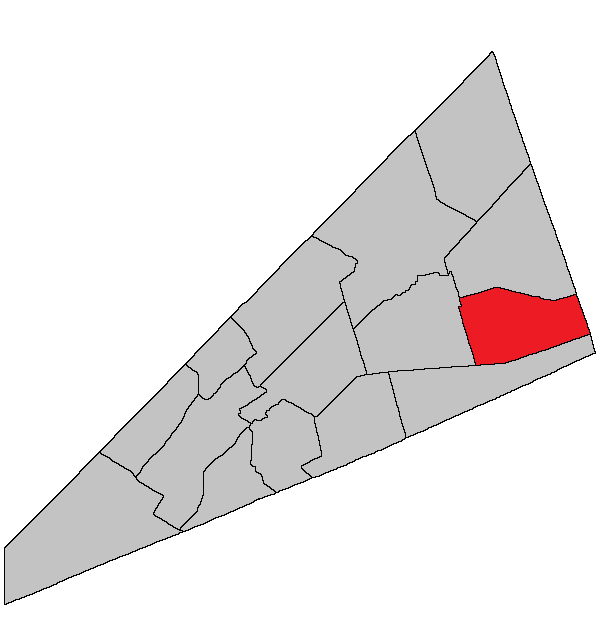
- Location within Kings County, New Brunswick.
- Coordinates: 45.84°N 64.59°W
- Country: Canada
- Province: New Brunswick
- County: Kings County
- Erected: 1874

Area
  - Land: 221.27 km^{2} (85.43 sq mi)

Population (2021)
  - Total: 491
  - Density: 2.2/km^{2} (5.7/sq mi)
  - Change 2016-2021: ▲4.7%
  - Dwellings: 255
- Time zone: UTC-4 (AST)
  - Summer (DST): UTC-3 (ADT)

Waterford is a geographic parish in Kings County, New Brunswick, Canada.

Prior to the 2023 governance reform, for governance purposes it formed the local service district of the parish of Waterford, which was a member of Kings Regional Service Commission (RSC8).

The community of Waterford has an active outdoor ice rink (Waterford Youth Centre) as well as a Community Hall that hold events such as paint nights, Thanksgiving and Christmas dinners, Easter parties and more. The area is known for its Skiing and Mountain Biking at Poley Mountain Resorts, hunting, fishing ATVing and other outdoor activities. Some local hotspots include: Friars Nose, Trout Creek Falls, Waterford Falls, Adairs Wilderness Lodge, Parlee Brook Amphitheatre Trail, Urney Covered Bridge and the Moores Mill Covered Bridge.

== Origin of name ==
The parish was said locally to be named by Mr. A. McAfee, an Irish immigrant, for Waterford, Ireland.

== History ==
Waterford was erected in 1874 from Sussex Parish.

In 1875 the boundary with Hammond Parish was altered.

== Boundaries ==
Waterford Parish is bounded:

- on the north by a line beginning on the Sussex Parish line at a point southeast of DeCourcey Lake and about 1.4 kilometres north-northwest of Trout Creek, then running east-northeasterly along the southern line of grants straddling Picadilly Road until it reaches the northeastern corner of a grant to David Law on the southern side of Law Road, then east-southeasterly to the northwestern line of a grant to Thomas Nicholson, on the eastern side of Morton Road west-southwesterly of Mechanic Lake, then east-northeasterly along the northern line of the Nicholson grant and its prolongation to the Albert County line;
- on the east by the Albert County line;
- on the south by a line beginning on the Albert County line at a point about 1.65 kilometres south-southeast from Route 114, then running north 88º west (Note: By the magnet of 1875, when declination in the area was about 21º west of north.) to the northeastern corner of a grant to William Thompson, about 450 metres south of the southern tip of Walton Lake and about 150 metres west of the Creek Road, then westerly to a point about 825 metres north of the western end of Cassidy Lake in Upham Parish;
- on the west by a line running south (Note: By the magnet of 1795, when declination in the area was between 15º and 16º west of north.) from the mouth of Halfway Brook in Studholm Parish.

== Communities ==
Communities at least partly within the parish. italics indicate a name no longer in official use

- Cedar Camp
- Chambers Settlement
- Donegal
- Long Settlement
- Parlee Brook
- Urney
- Walker Settlement
- Waterford

== Bodies of water ==
Bodies of water (Note: Not including brooks, ponds or coves.) at least partly in the parish.

- Point Wolfe River
- Trout Creek
- Flood Lake
- Hamilton Lake
- Lair Lake
- Mechanic Lake
- Pleasant Lake
- Victor Lake
- Walton Lake
- Wolfe Lake

== Other notable places ==
Parks, historic sites, and other noteworthy places at least partly in the parish.

- Fundy National Park
- McManus Hill Protected Natural Area
- Poley Mountain

== Demographics ==
=== Population ===
Population trend

| Census | Population | Change (%) |
|---|---|---|
| 2016 | 469 | ▲2.4% |
| 2011 | 458 | ▼9.3% |
| 2006 | 505 | ▼2.5% |
| 2001 | 518 | ▼7.3% |
| 1996 | 559 | Steady |

=== Language ===
Mother tongue language (2016)

| Language | Population | Pct (%) |
|---|---|---|
| English only | 455 | 96.8% |
| French only | 5 | 1.1% |
| Both English and French | 0 | 0% |
| Other languages | 10 | 2.1% |

== Access Routes ==
Highways and numbered routes that run through the parish, including external routes that start or finish at the parish limits:

- Highways
  - Route 111
  - Route 114

== Notable people ==
- Bessie Ella Hazen, painter, born in Waterford

== See also ==
- List of parishes in New Brunswick
