= Nauwigewauk, New Brunswick =

Nauwigewauk
- Location within New Brunswick
- Coordinates: 45.51507°N 65.83368°W
- Country: Canada
- Province: New Brunswick
- County: Kings
- Parish: Hampton

Government
  - MLA: John Herron
  - MP: Rob Moore

Area
  - Total: 30.54 km^{2} (11.79 sq mi)

Population (2016)
  - Total: 1,472
  - Density: 48.2/km^{2} (125/sq mi)
- Time zone: UTC-4 (Atlantic (AST))
  - Summer (DST): UTC-3 (ADT)
- Canadian Postal code: E5N
- Area code: 506

Nauwigewauk is a rural community in Kings County, New Brunswick, Canada. It is located near the communities of Quispamsis and Lakeside at the mouth of the Hammond River, and borders the town of Hampton. The people of Nauwigewauk are sometimes locally known as Nauwigewaukies.

== Name ==
Nauwigewauk was named in 1858 by the commissioners of the European and North American Railway. The names derives from Nuhwig'ewauk, the Maliseet name for the Hammond River, possibly meaning "slow current."

== History ==
Nauwigewauk was a station on the European and North American Railway and, later, on the Canadian National Railway. As of 2015, the CNR's single-track Sussex Subdivision still runs through the community to provide rail service connecting the Port of Saint John to the CN main line at Moncton. The town's station is defunct. The community had a post office from c. 1885 until 1969.

In 1898, the town had a population of 150, one post office, one store, and two churches.

== Demographics ==
In the 2021 Census of Population conducted by Statistics Canada, Nauwigewauk had a population of 1,538 living in 614 of its 633 total private dwellings, a change of 4.5% from its 2016 population of 1,472. With a land area of 30.49 km^{2} (11.77 sq mi), it had a population density of 50.4/km^{2} (130.6/sq mi) in 2021.

Canada census – Nauwigewauk, New Brunswick community profile

	2016	2011
Population	1,472 (-4.4% from 2011)	1,539 (+5.2% from 2006)
Land area	30.54 km^{2} (11.79 sq mi)	30.62 km^{2} (11.82 sq mi)
Population density	48.2/km^{2} (125/sq mi)	50.3/km^{2} (130/sq mi)
Median age	48.0 (M: 45.9, F: 49.0)	44.6 (M: 44.2, F: 45.0)
Private dwellings	590 (total)	610 (total)
Median household income	$81,887

References: 2016 2011

== Notable person ==
- Anna Ruth Lang, a recipient of the Canadian Cross of Valour.

== See also ==
- List of communities in New Brunswick
