= Havelock Parish, New Brunswick =

Havelock
- Parish
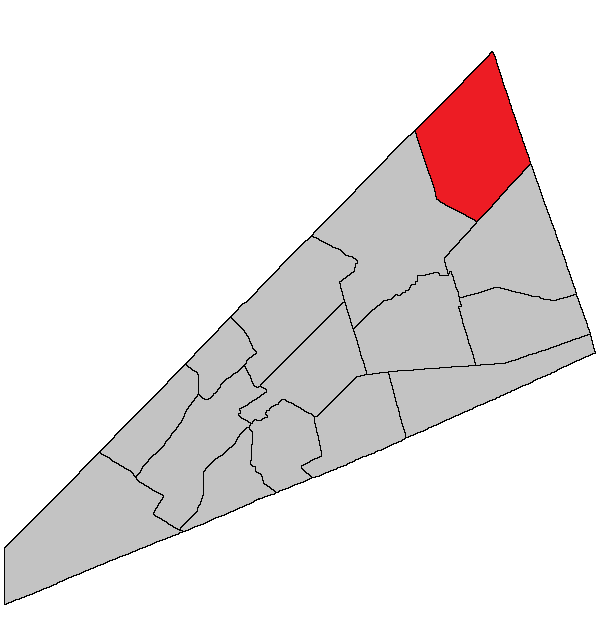
- Location within Kings County, New Brunswick.
- Coordinates: 45.84°N 64.59°W
- Country: Canada
- Province: New Brunswick
- County: Kings County
- Erected: 1859

Area
  - Land: 349.22 km^{2} (134.83 sq mi)

Population (2021)
  - Total: 1,042
  - Density: 3/km^{2} (7.8/sq mi)
  - Change 2016-2021: ▼1.8%
  - Dwellings: 522
- Time zone: UTC-4 (AST)
  - Summer (DST): UTC-3 (ADT)

Havelock is a geographic parish in Kings County, New Brunswick, Canada.

Prior to the 2023 governance reform, it comprised the local service district of the parish of Havelock, which further included the western part of the service area of Havelock Inside. (Note: Regulation 84-168 does not explicitly state that Havelock Inside extends outside the parish of Havelock but its boundary description makes it obvious it does.) The local service district was a member of Kings Regional Service Commission (RSC8).

== Origin of name ==
The parish was named in honour of Henry Havelock, commander of British forces at the Siege of Lucknow in 1857, who died shortly after the siege was lifted.

== History ==
Havelock was erected in 1859 from the eastern polling district of Studholm Parish.

In 1871 part of Havelock along Windgap Brook was returned to Studholm.

== Boundaries ==
Havelock Parish is bounded:

- on the northwest by the Queens County line;
- on the east by the Westmorland County line;
- on the southeast by a line running north 66º east (Note: By the magnet of 1840, when declination in the area was about 18º west of north.) from the northeastern corner of a grant to Jacob Smith, about 975 metres north of the junction of Plumweseep Road and Back Road;
- on the west by a line beginning on the Cardwell Parish line near the Old Mine Road west of Dunsinane, then running northwesterly along the prolongation of the southwestern line of a grant to James Caruth, which is on the southern bank of Windgap Brook and on the eastern side of Jordan Mountain Road, until it strikes Windgap Brook, then upstream to the prolongation of Miller Road, then north-northwesterly along the prolongation, the length of Miller Road, and the northerly prolongation of Miller Road until it strikes the Queens County line.

== Communities ==
Communities at least partly within the parish. italics indicate a name no longer in official use

- Anagance Ridge
- Buckley Settlement
- Canaan Road
- Cornhill
- Cornhill East
- Cosman Settlement
- Creek Road
- Dubee Settlement
- Havelock
- Knightville
- Lower Ridge
- Mannhurst
- Perry Settlement
- Salem
- Samp Hill
- Springhill
- Thornbrook
- Whites Mountain

== Bodies of water ==
Bodies of water (Note: Not including brooks, ponds or coves.) at least partly within the parish.

- Canaan River
- Millstream River
- Smiths Creek
- Square Meadow Creek

== Other notable places ==
Parks, historic sites, and other noteworthy places at least partly within the parish.

- Havelock Airport

== Demographics ==
=== Population ===
Population trend

Census	Population	Change (%)
2016	1,061	▼8.4%
2011	1,158	▼2.6%
2006	1,189	▼0.1%
2001	1,190	Steady

=== Language ===
Mother tongue (2016)

Language	Population	Pct (%)
English only	1,005	94.8%
French only	25	2.4%
Both English and French	0	0%
Other languages	30	2.8%

== Access Routes ==
Highways and numbered routes that run through the parish, including external routes that start or finish at the parish limits:

- Highways
  - Route 2 (TCH)
- Principal Routes
  - Route 112
- Secondary Routes:
  - Route 880
  - Route 885
  - Route 890
- External Routes:
  - None

== See also ==
- List of parishes in New Brunswick
