= Bloomfield Ridge, New Brunswick =

Bloomfield Ridge is the name for two different locations in the Canadian province of New Brunswick:

- Bloomfield Ridge in an unincorporated rural community in Kings County
- Bloomfield Ridge is a neighbourhood in Upper Miramichi in York County
