= Emily Elizabeth Shaw Beavan =

Irish-born poet and writer

- Born: Emily Elizabeth Shaw c. 1818; Belfast, Ireland
- Died: 6 August 1897; Sydney, Australia
- Occupations: Poet and author

Emily Elizabeth Shaw Beavan (c. 1818 — 6 August 1897), was an Irish born 19th-century poet and story writer who lived in Canada, England and Australia.

== Early life and education ==
Born Emily Elizabeth Shaw in about 1818 in Belfast, Ireland, she was the daughter of Samuel Shaw, a Master Mariner, and Isabella Adelaide McMorran. Her father sailed between Canada and Ireland regularly. She emigrated with her family, including at least two sisters and two brothers, to New Brunswick, Canada in 1836. She continued her education there and gained her teacher's licence in King's County on 18 September 1837. She was teaching in Norton at the time.

She married Frederick Williams Cadwalleder Beavan on 19 June 1838 in Sussex Vale, Kings County. Her husband was the local surgeon and teacher. The couple initially lived in Long Creek, New Brunswick. Later, they moved to Mount Auburn, English Settlement. There, Beavan contributed stories and poems to the newly established paper, Amaranth. While she didn't use a pen name, she wrote under the common practice of dashing out letters from the name, such as Mrs B----n or Emily B----n.

In 1842, Beavan requested a teacher's license for Queens County. However, in 1843, the family migrated to England where her husband's father had died allowing her husband to take up his position as surgeon at the Derwent Mines in Blanchland, Northumberland. Her first book, Sketches and tales illustrative of life in the backwoods of New Brunswick, North America, was published while she was living in England in 1845.

They did not remain long in England. In 1852, the family moved again to Kilmore, Melbourne. There, Beavan wrote for Eliza Cook's Journal and various local newspapers. Her husband died in 1867 and Beavan moved to live with her son in Sydney in 1881. She died on 6 August 1897. While she was buried in an unmarked grave at Rookwood Cemetery, a memorial was put on her husband's grave in Kilmore General Cemetery.

== Bibliography ==
- Sketches and tales illustrative of life in the backwoods of New Brunswick, North America, 1845

Online copy of Sketches and tales illustrative of life in the backwoods of New Brunswick, which you can look through at the link above.

=== Poems ===
- Song Of The Irish Mourner
- The Mother's Prayer
- On Prayer
- The Mignonette
- A Vision

=== Short stories ===
- The Lost One
- Adelaide Belmore
- Recollections of Tombe St
- Edith Melborne
- A Tale of New Brunswick
- Madeline St. Clair
- Story of Deara, Princess Meath
- A Tale of Intemperance
- The Enthusiast
- Lines (The Lost Children)
