= New Brunswick Route 880 =

Highway in New Brunswick, Canada

Coordinates: 45.905778°N 65.452766°W

Route 880

Route information
- Maintained by New Brunswick Department of Transportation
- Length: 65 km (40 mi)

Major junctions
- East end: Route 112 in Second North River
- Route 10 in Berwick
- West end: Route 121 in Apohaqui

Location
- Country: Canada
- Province: New Brunswick

Highway system
- Provincial highways in New Brunswick; Former routes
← Route 875	→ Route 885

Route 880 is a 65.3-kilometre (40.6 mi) long east to west secondary highway in the south-eastern portion of New Brunswick, Canada.

== Route description ==
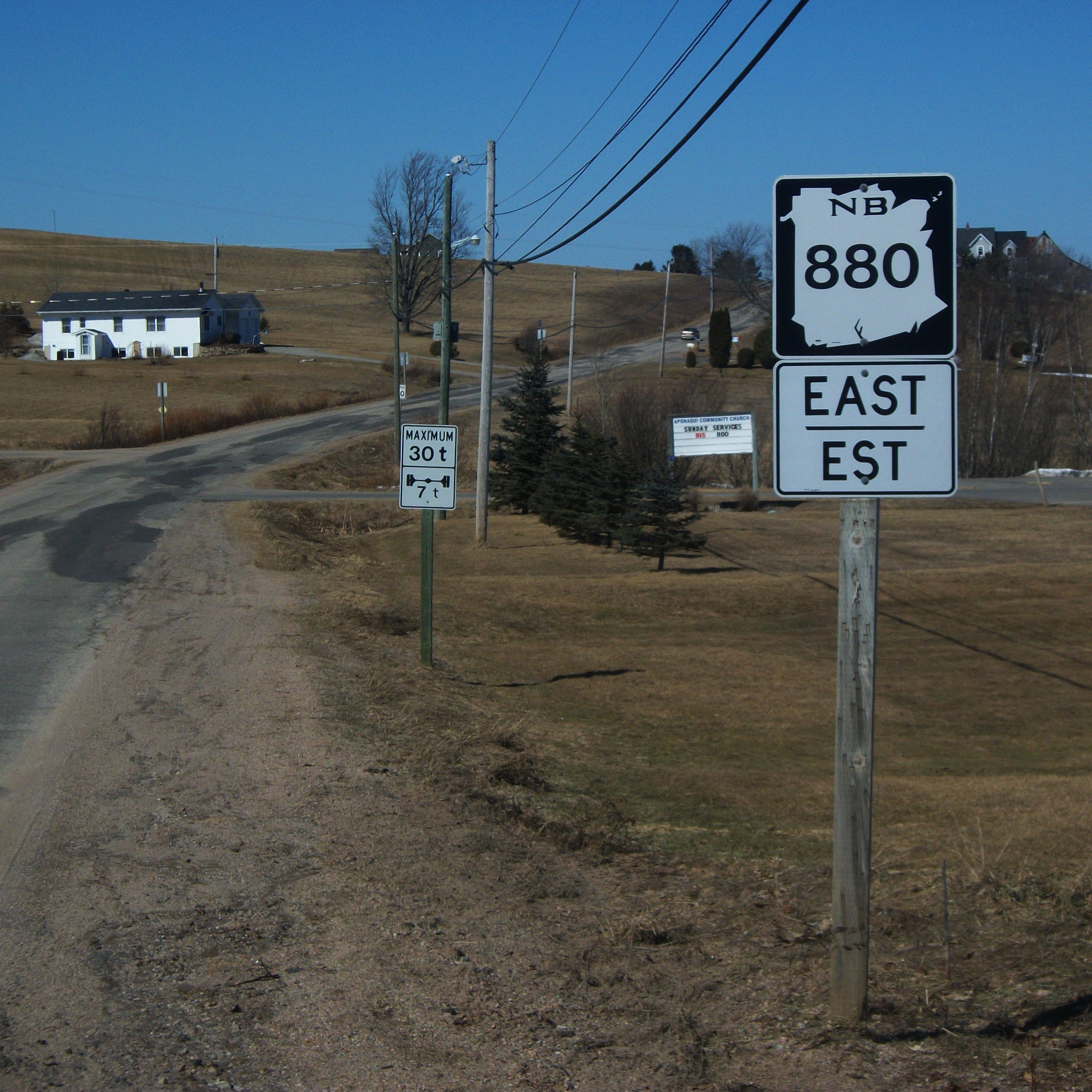
Route 880

Most of the route is in Kings County.

The route's northeastern terminus is in Second North River at Route 112, where is travels southwest along the North River before crossing it and entering Lewis Mountain. It continues through Dobsons Corner, Upper Ridge, and Hicksville, and it briefly merges with Route 885 in Havelock. The route then passes through a mostly wooded area as it arrives in Lower Ridge and crosses Route 2. It continues past Perry Settlement, Cosman Settlement, and Head of Millstream, Gibbon, Summerfield, Pleasant Ridge, and Centreville. It then follows the Millstream River to Berwick and Route 10. The route continues to Lower Millstream at the eastern terminus of Route 875 and ends in the community of Apohaqui at Route 121.
