= New Brunswick Route 855 =

Highway in New Brunswick, Canada

Coordinates: 45.626284°N 65.775833°W

Route 855

Route information
- Maintained by New Brunswick Department of Transportation
- Length: 9 km (5.6 mi)

Major junctions
- North end: Route 124 in Midland
- South end: Route 121 in Bloomfield

Location
- Country: Canada
- Province: New Brunswick

Highway system
- Provincial highways in New Brunswick; Former routes
← Route 850	→ Route 860

Route 855 is a 9-kilometre (5.6 mi) long mostly north–south secondary highway in the southwestern portion of New Brunswick, Canada.

== Route description ==
Most of the route is in Kings County.

The route's northern terminus is north of Midland at Route 124, where it travels south through Midland. The route then travels through a heavily wooded area past Dickie Mountain and ends at Route 121 north of Bloomfield.
