= Sussex, New Brunswick =

Sussex
- Town
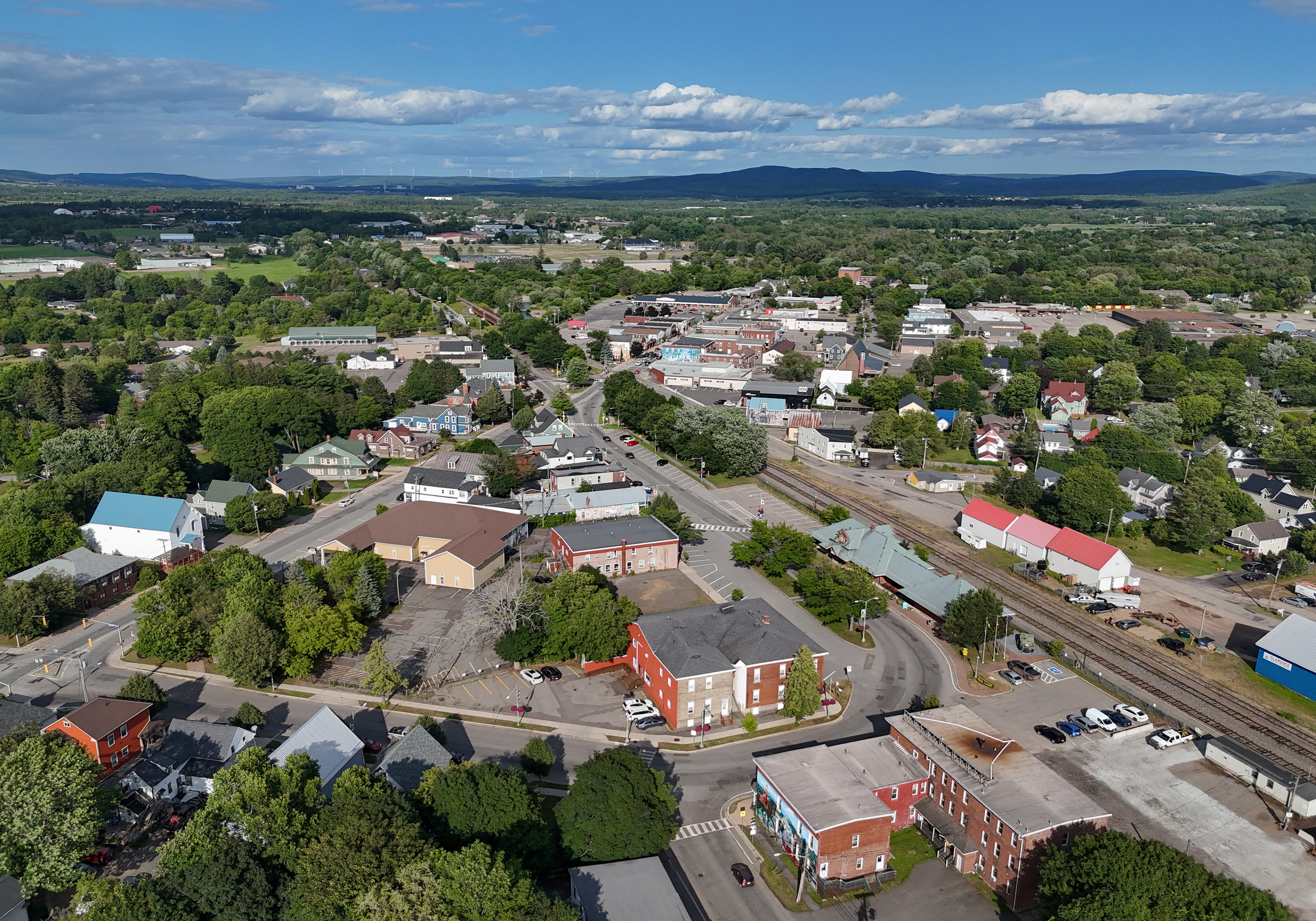
- Downtown Sussex
- Nicknames: Cow Town, Dairy Town
- Mottoes: Gateway to the Fundy Experience, Mural Capital of Atlantic Canada
- Location within New Brunswick Location within Canada
- Coordinates: 45°43′25″N 65°30′37″W
- Country: Canada
- Province: New Brunswick
- County: Kings County
- Parish: Sussex Parish
- Incorporated: June 2, 1904

Government
  - Type: Town Council
  - Mayor: Marc Thorne
  - Councillors: Doug Bobbitt, Fred B. Brenan, Catherine MacLeod, Gisele E. McKnight, Graham A. Milner, Ann-Marie Snyder, Tim Wilson

Area
  - Land: 8.90 km^{2} (3.44 sq mi)
- Elevation: 18 to 124 m (59 to 407 ft)

Population (2021)
  - Total: 4,440
  - Density: 498.9/km^{2} (1,292/sq mi)
  - Change (2016–21): ▲3.7%
- Time zone: UTC−04:00 (AST)
  - Summer (DST): UTC−03:00 (ADT)
- Canadian Postal code: E4E
- Area code: 506
- Telephone Exchange: 432, 433, 434, 435, 512, 944
- NTS Map: 21H12 Sussex
- GNBC Code: DASFF
- Website: https://www.sussex.ca

Sussex is a town in Kings County, New Brunswick, Canada. Sussex is located in south central New Brunswick, between the province's three largest cities, Saint John, Moncton, and Fredericton.

Sussex straddles the Kennebecasis River, 70 km (43 mi) northeast of Saint John, and is a major dairy product producer in the province. It is home to Atlantic Canada's largest hot air balloon festival.

On 1 January 2023, Sussex amalgamated with the village of Sussex Corner and part of the local service district of the parish of Sussex. Revised census figures have not been released, although combining the 2016 census numbers the total population would be approximately 5,900.

== History ==
Sussex, NB Historical populations
Year	Pop.	±%
1901	1,398	—
1911	1,906	+36.3%
1921	2,198	+15.3%
1931	2,252	+2.5%
1941	3,027	+34.4%
1951	3,224	+6.5%
1961	3,457	+7.2%
1981	3,972	+14.9%
1986	4,114	+3.6%
1991	4,132	+0.4%
1996	4,293	+3.9%
2001	4,182	−2.6%
2006	4,241	+1.4%
2011	4,312	+1.7%
2016	4,282	−0.7%
2021	4,440	+3.7%

In 1857, the European and North American Railway was opened, connecting the farming communities of the Kennebecasis River valley with Saint John and Moncton. Sussex was incorporated in accordance with Chapter 44 of the Town Incorporation Act of 1896 and was officially established as a Town on June 2, 1904. Prior to its incorporation, the area was known as Sussex Vale from 1810 – 1898 and was a farming community of 185 people . This grew to include the surrounding area of Lower Sussex.

The settlers were for the most part British Loyalists who had fled the American Revolution in 1776, with many Irish refugees of the Great Famine from the mid-19th century settling in the nearby farming communities.

In 1885, the Sussex Military Camp was established on the eastern edge of the town. The facility was closed following the Second World War and the town purchased the land to expand the municipal boundaries. Today the agricultural exhibition and some areas remain as open land on the former site of Camp Sussex.

Sussex underwent several changes in the post-war period. In the early 1960s, several local roads were upgraded as part of the Trans-Canada Highway project which saw Route 2 pass immediately north of the town between Fredericton and Moncton. At the same time, a series of local roads in the Kennebecasis River valley were designated as Route 1, running from an interchange with the Trans-Canada at Sussex, southwest to Saint John.

The creation of Sussex as a highway interchange in this post-war period led to some transportation planners in New Brunswick calling for the consolidation or closure of the Fredericton, Saint John and Moncton airports to be replaced by a single airport located in Sussex to serve all three population centres of southern New Brunswick; this was before the facilities underwent considerable expansion in the late 1950s to early 1960s.

Potash was subsequently discovered in large quantities in the area surrounding Sussex, with the deposit being the second largest in the world after an area in Saskatchewan. Three mines were built near the town, two at Penobsquis, 8 km (5.0 mi) to the east, and another at Cassidy Lake (no longer operational), 10 km (6.2 mi) to the southwest. CN Rail built track to serve both mines, which employed hundreds from the surrounding area. Since 2003, natural gas has been produced from the McCully field near Sussex. Price decreases of the potash market combined with underground structural issues caused the Potash Corporation of Saskatchewan to close its Picadilly mining operation in January 2016, and then its Penobsquis mine in November 2018.

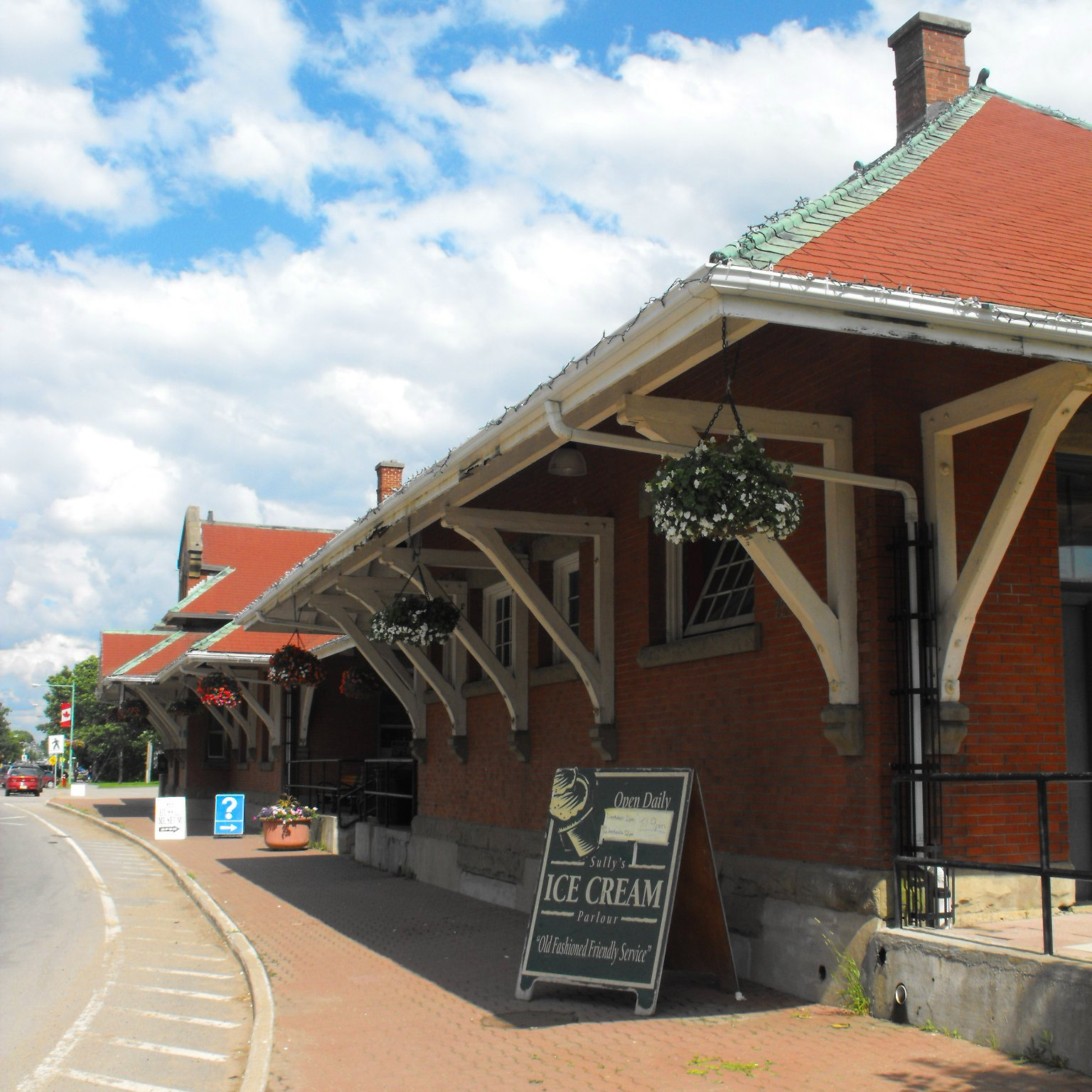
The former CN rail station in Sussex now houses the 8th Canadian Hussars Museum and Sullys ice cream parlor.

Sussex also began to see a growing tourism trade, with many flocking to see the collection of wood-constructed covered bridges throughout the central area of Kings County.

Today, Sussex is primarily a regional service centre for the surrounding agricultural communities of the upper Kennebecasis River valley, as well as a highway service centre on Route 1, the primary highway between Moncton and Saint John, as well as being the most heavily travelled route in the Maritimes to the United States.

Her Majesty Queen Elizabeth II visited the town as part of her Golden Jubilee tour of Canada. On October 12, 2002, she attended the opening of a new wing of Sussex Elementary School, unveiling a commemorative plaque at the event. She then visited Princess Louise Park for an agricultural exhibition. While there, it was announced that the community hall would be renamed Jubilee Hall in her honour. Both appearances drew thousands of visitors from Sussex and beyond.

=== Amalgamation ===
On January 1, 2023, Sussex and the village of Sussex Corner were amalgamated. The village of Sussex Corner was incorporated into the Town of Sussex.

== Economy ==
The town is home to Sussex Golden Ginger Ale, a Maritime beverage.

The town entered economic difficulty during the late 1990s after the Cassidy Lake potash mine flooded, resulting in hundreds of lay-offs. Another significant blow came in October 2002 with a realignment of the Trans-Canada Highway (Route 2) between Fredericton and Moncton which no longer passed through Sussex, instead carrying the province's east–west interprovincial traffic 30 km (19 mi) north of the town. At the same time, Route 1 was extended east on the old Trans-Canada alignment to an interchange at River Glade near Three Rivers and Route 10 was extended on the old Trans-Canada from an interchange with the new Route 2 alignment at Young's Cove Road south to Sussex.

In 2022, there were rumours that the regional potash mines might reopen, due to a substantial rise in the market price of the commodity; however, Nutrien declined to do so.

=== Media ===
Kings County Record has been in existence since 1887. It is a weekly paper which serves Sussex and the surrounding areas. The paper is published on Tuesdays.

The town plays host to a handful of radio stations:

- CJCW AM 590, local radio station
- CITA 107.3 FM, a Moncton Christian radio station rebroadcaster
- CBC Radio One 106.7 FM

=== Tourism ===
- As the heart of Kings County with its 16 covered bridges, Sussex is known as the Covered Bridge Capital of Atlantic Canada. Eight of these wooden structures are within a ten-minute drive of town hall.
- 26 murals were created during the summers of 2006 and 2007, establishing its reputation as the Mural Capital of Atlantic Canada. Murals exist as an outdoor art gallery in which the town provides a free digital tour guide.
- An international hot air balloon festival is held every September, and Canada's largest outdoor flea market each August.
- An agricultural fair takes place every fall at the Agricultural Museum of New Brunswick. The first fair was held in 1841.
- Sussex is home to the Sussex Drive-In, a single screen drive-in theatre, which has been in operation since 1967. The Sussex Drive-In has a 24m high screen and 300 car capacity. It is opened seasonally in the summer.
- Southern New Brunswick's only alpine ski hill, Poley Mountain, in the Caledonia Highlands is located southeast of the town.

==== Atlantic International Balloon Fiesta ====
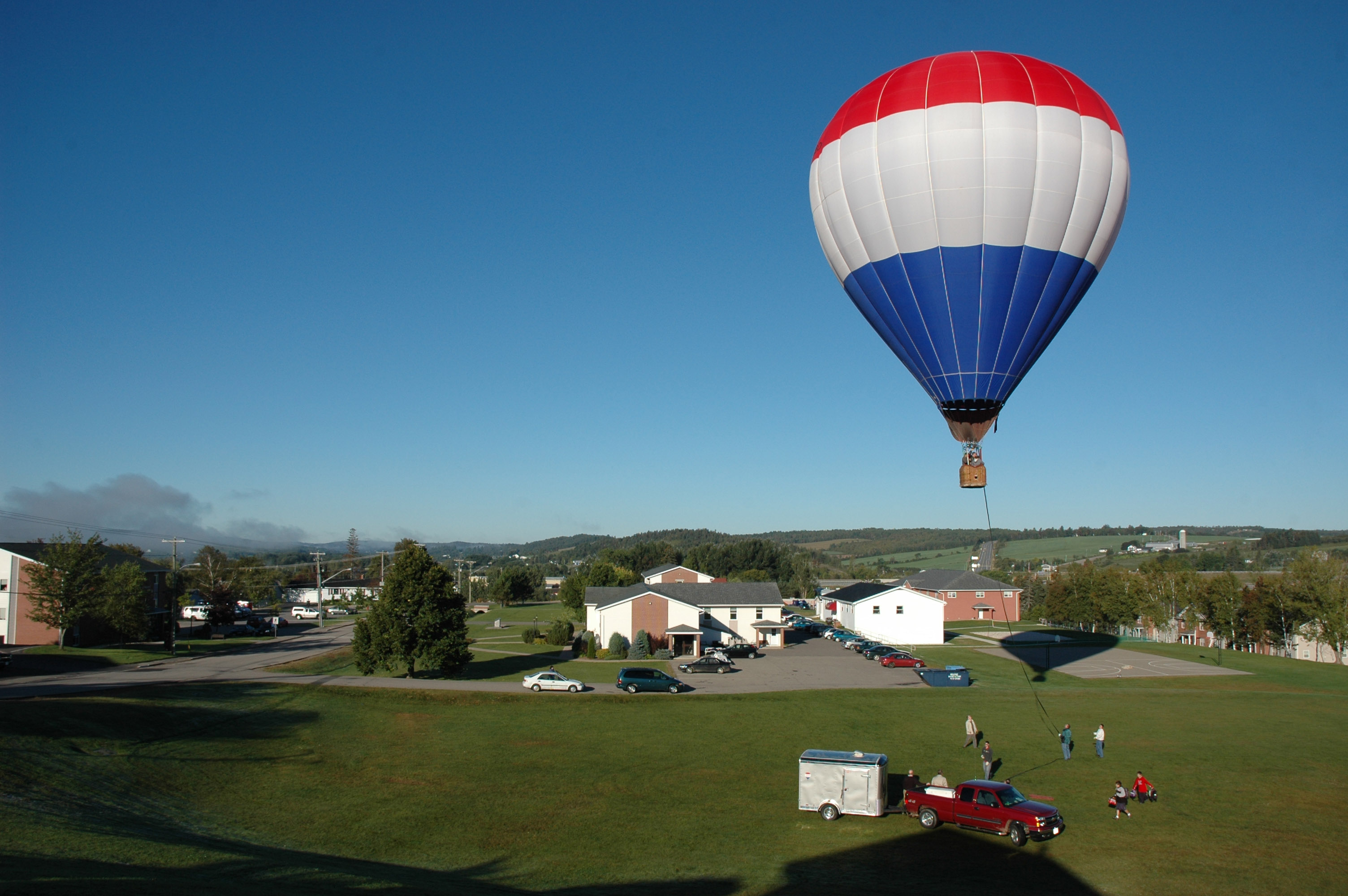
Hot air balloon in Sussex at the baseball field

The largest hot air balloon festival in Atlantic Canada is held each summer in Sussex. On the weekend after Labour Day, Sussex hosts up to 50,000 - 80,000 visitors who come to watch 40 hot air balloons. Along with the twice-daily flights, the event includes a giant craft fair, a free outdoor concert and an amusement park. the festival has been held since 1986.

==== Princess Louise Park Show Centre ====
The Princess Louise Park Show Centre is Eastern Canada's premier Agricultural Exhibition Centre. Located in Sussex, this facility is the host of many shows that include equine, dogs, livestock, sales and exhibitions as well as 4H and youth group activities. Princess Louise Park Show Centre is a board owned and operated exhibition ground that was founded in 1985. It hosts shows attracting people from all over the county, province, and country. It doubles as a storage facility for RVs and trailers during the winter months. The centre has five barns with stalls, three riding rings, and electrical and sewage hookups.

==== Agricultural Museum of New Brunswick ====
Sussex has been home to the Agricultural Museum of New Brunswick since 1983. The museum was opened by community members and it is now maintained by a board of volunteers. The land that the museum is situated on once belonged to the 8th Hussars. The museum is closed every year from October to May.

== Education ==
=== Primary and Secondary Education ===
The Anglophone South School District manages 4 public schools within the town:

- Sussex Elementary School
- Sussex Corner Elementary School
- Sussex Middle School
- Sussex Regional High School

Sussex also has one private school for students from Junior Kindergarten through to Grade 12:

- Sussex Christian School

=== Higher Education ===
Sussex is also home to Kingswood University (formerly Bethany Bible College). Kingswood University is an accredited Christian university, it is the only college in Canada which is owned by the Wesleyan Church.

== Demographics ==
In the 2021 Census of Population conducted by Statistics Canada, Sussex had a population of 4,440 living in 2,065 of its 2,219 total private dwellings, a change of 3.7% from its 2016 population of 4,282. With a land area of 8.9 km^{2} (3.4 sq mi), it had a population density of 498.9/km^{2} (1,292.1/sq mi) in 2021.

Most people in Sussex have some Scottish, French, English, or Irish ancestry. There are smaller groups of German and Dutch lineage. The town is almost universally anglophone, being in the heart of English-speaking southern New Brunswick.

== Climate ==
Climate data for Sussex, 1981–2010 normals, extremes 1897–present
Month	Jan	Feb	Mar	Apr	May	Jun	Jul	Aug	Sep	Oct	Nov	Dec	Year
Record high °C (°F)	17.3 (63.1)	16.1 (61.0)	24.5 (76.1)	29.4 (84.9)	35.0 (95.0)	34.4 (93.9)	35.6 (96.1)	37.2 (99.0)	33.3 (91.9)	29.4 (84.9)	23.3 (73.9)	18.0 (64.4)	37.2 (99.0)
Mean daily maximum °C (°F)	−2.9 (26.8)	−1.1 (30.0)	3.4 (38.1)	10.0 (50.0)	17.2 (63.0)	22.3 (72.1)	25.3 (77.5)	25.0 (77.0)	20.2 (68.4)	13.5 (56.3)	6.8 (44.2)	0.5 (32.9)	11.7 (53.1)
Daily mean °C (°F)	−8.5 (16.7)	−6.8 (19.8)	−1.9 (28.6)	4.8 (40.6)	11.1 (52.0)	16.0 (60.8)	19.2 (66.6)	18.8 (65.8)	14.3 (57.7)	8.1 (46.6)	2.4 (36.3)	−4.5 (23.9)	6.1 (43.0)
Mean daily minimum °C (°F)	−14.0 (6.8)	−12.5 (9.5)	−7.0 (19.4)	−0.5 (31.1)	4.9 (40.8)	9.6 (49.3)	13.1 (55.6)	12.6 (54.7)	8.3 (46.9)	2.7 (36.9)	−2.0 (28.4)	−9.4 (15.1)	0.5 (32.9)
Record low °C (°F)	−44.4 (−47.9)	−38.9 (−38.0)	−35.6 (−32.1)	−22.2 (−8.0)	−7.2 (19.0)	−5.0 (23.0)	0.0 (32.0)	−1.1 (30.0)	−6.7 (19.9)	−15.0 (5.0)	−25.0 (−13.0)	−37.2 (−35.0)	−44.4 (−47.9)
Average precipitation mm (inches)	108.8 (4.28)	85.0 (3.35)	114.7 (4.52)	89.7 (3.53)	103.0 (4.06)	88.4 (3.48)	84.0 (3.31)	74.3 (2.93)	99.9 (3.93)	106.5 (4.19)	110.0 (4.33)	105.6 (4.16)	1,169.9 (46.06)
Average rainfall mm (inches)	44.3 (1.74)	38.7 (1.52)	64.9 (2.56)	69.4 (2.73)	100.3 (3.95)	88.4 (3.48)	84.0 (3.31)	74.3 (2.93)	99.9 (3.93)	106.3 (4.19)	95.1 (3.74)	60.3 (2.37)	926.1 (36.46)
Average snowfall cm (inches)	64.5 (25.4)	46.3 (18.2)	49.7 (19.6)	20.3 (8.0)	2.7 (1.1)	0.0 (0.0)	0.0 (0.0)	0.0 (0.0)	0.0 (0.0)	0.2 (0.1)	14.8 (5.8)	45.3 (17.8)	243.8 (96.0)
Average precipitation days (≥ 0.2 mm)	11.4	9.9	11.9	12.7	13.8	12.8	11.0	10.3	10.7	12.9	14.3	12.5	144.1
Average rainy days (≥ 0.2 mm)	4.4	4.8	7.0	10.4	13.7	12.8	11.0	10.3	10.7	12.9	12.4	7.0	117.4
Average snowy days (≥ 0.2 cm)	8.4	6.6	6.5	3.4	0.40	0.0	0.0	0.0	0.0	0.08	3.0	6.8	35.2
Source: Environment Canada

== Notable people ==
- Julian Austin, country music artist
- Mike Eagles, NHL hockey player, 1983-2000
- Christian Meier, cyclist
- William Pugsley, lawyer and 11th Premier of New Brunswick
- Melanie Robillard, curling World Champion 2010
- Tim Steeves, comedian, 1964-2022
- Ellen Watters, cyclist, 1988-2016. In 2017, community members created Ellen's Tour de Sussex, an annual gran fondo in memory of Watters.

== See also ==
- List of communities in New Brunswick
