= Norton, New Brunswick =

Norton
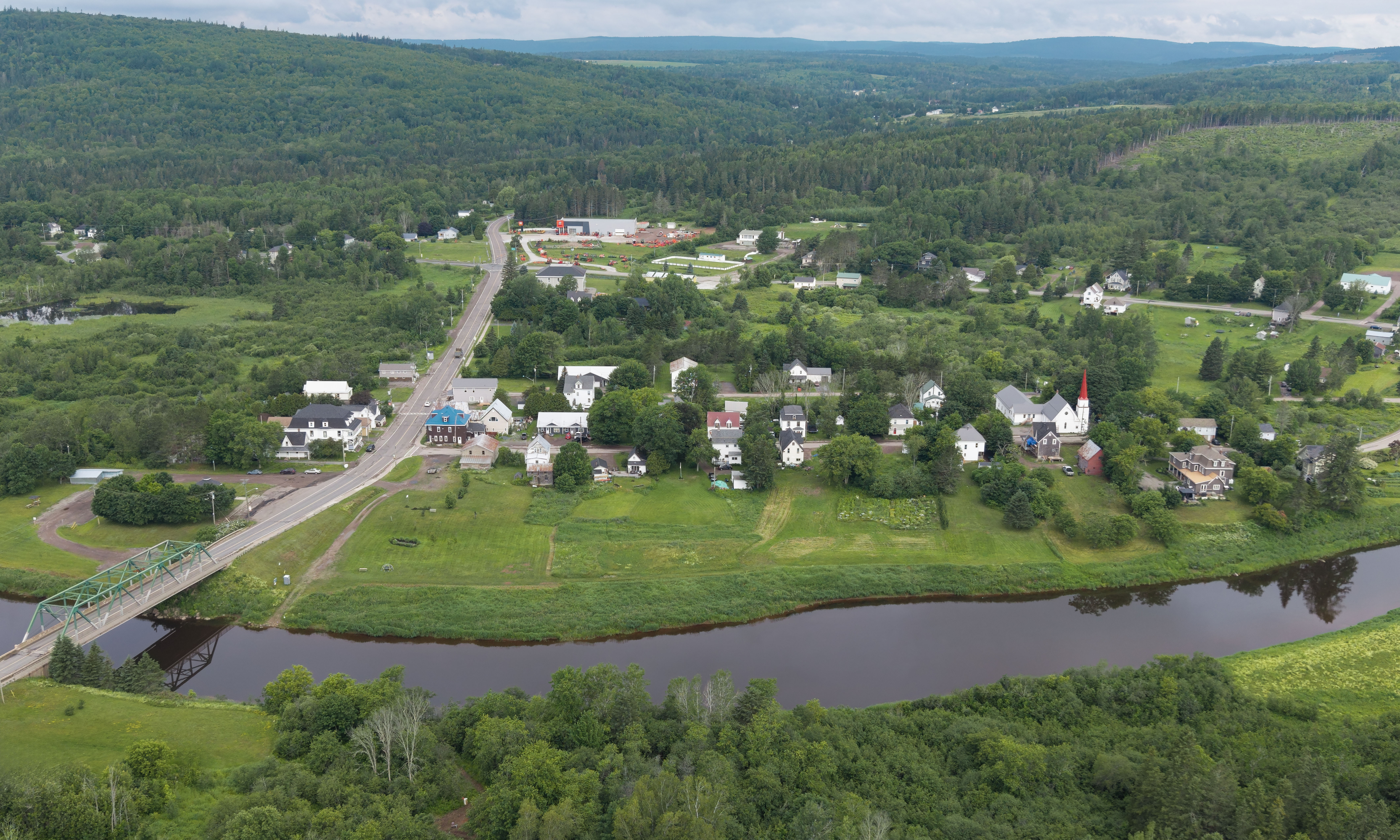
- Downtown (2026)

- Location of Norton in New Brunswick
- Coordinates: 45°38′19.3″N 65°41′43.8″W
- Country: Canada
- Province: New Brunswick
- County: Kings
- Municipality: Valley Waters
- Settled: 1783

Government
  - MP: Bev Harrison
  - Provincial Representative: Rob Moore

Area
  - Land: 75.35 km^{2} (29.09 sq mi)

Population (2021)
  - Total: 1,410
  - Density: 18.7/km^{2} (48/sq mi)
  - Change (2016–21): ▲2.0%
- Time zone: UTC-4 (Atlantic (AST))
  - Summer (DST): UTC-3 (ADT)

Norton is a former village in Kings County, New Brunswick, Canada, now part of the village of Valley Waters. It was likely named for Norton, Massachusetts.

== History ==
On 1 January 2023, Norton annexed all or part of five local service districts to form the new village of Valley Waters. The community's name remains in official use. Revised census figures have not been released.

== Geography ==
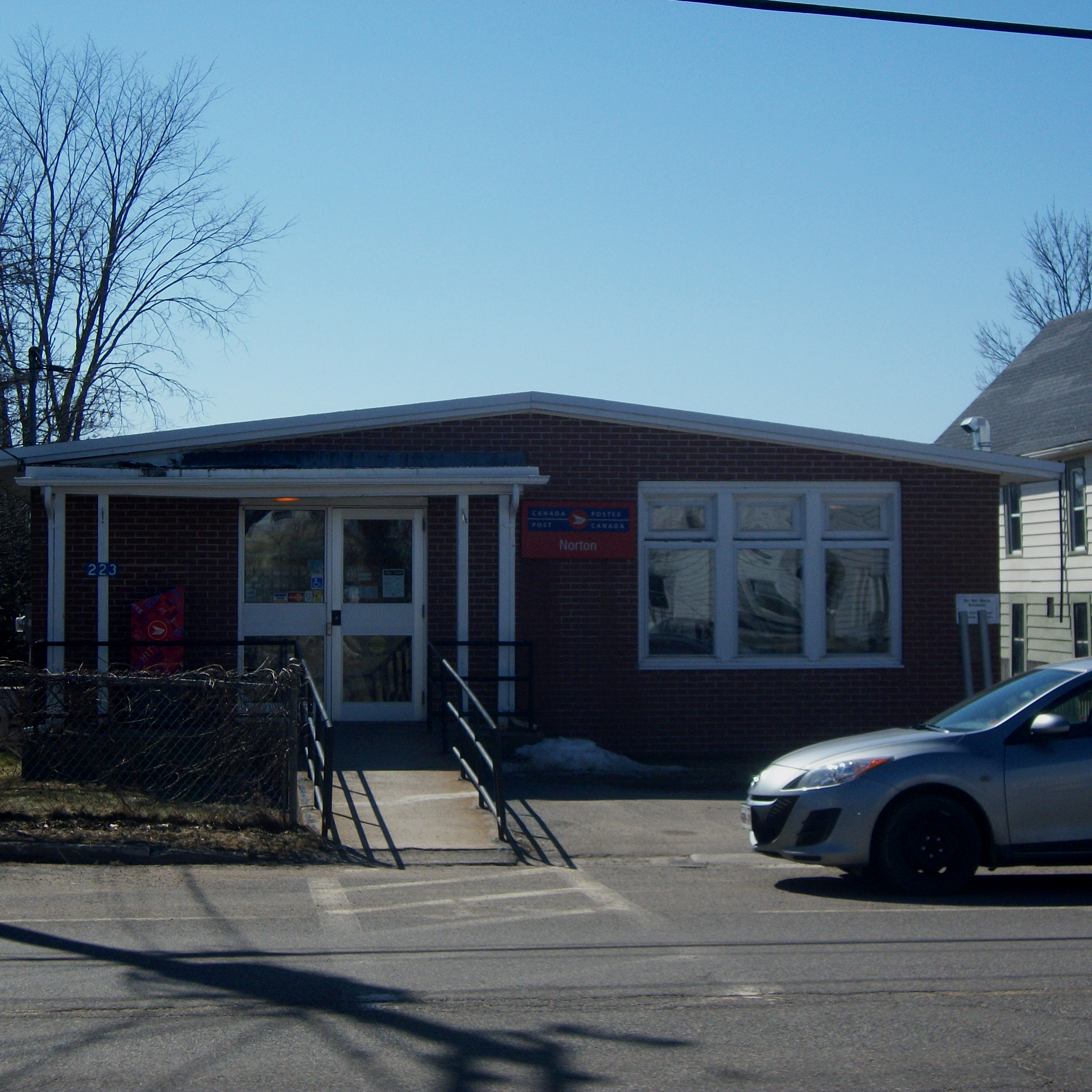
Norton Post Office (2013)

It is situated on the Kennebecasis River 55 kilometres northeast of Saint John. The European and North American Railway began serving Norton in 1859. Norton is home to the oldest fossil forest in Canada.

== Present day ==
Family Frolic Days used to be an annual village festival.

Country music singer Chris Cummings and rock musician, Ian Sherwood, of "Down With The Butterfly" and "Acres and Acres" are both natives of Norton.

Norton Elementary School, located at the intersection of Route 121 and Route 124, serves Norton students from kindergarten to grade five. It is a small, rural school is closely tied with the local community. French immersion is not offered at Norton Elementary but students can be bussed to Sussex Elementary if families wish to enroll students in French immersion before Middle School. Students are bussed to Sussex Middle after grade five and continue on to Sussex Regional High School afterward.

Norton is situated within the shale gas exploration area currently licensed to Corridor Resources.

== Demographics ==
In the 2021 Census of Population conducted by Statistics Canada, Norton had a population of 1,410 living in 547 of its 578 total private dwellings, a change of 2% from its 2016 population of 1,382. With a land area of 75.35 km^{2} (29.09 sq mi), it had a population density of 18.7/km^{2} (48.5/sq mi) in 2021.

== See also ==
- List of communities in New Brunswick
- Kings County, New Brunswick
- Belleisle, New Brunswick
- Cassidy Lake, New Brunswick
