= Studholm Parish, New Brunswick =

Studholm
- Parish
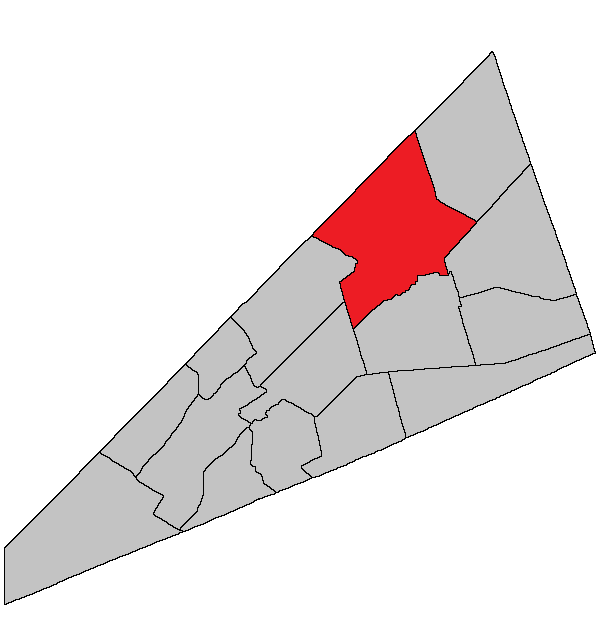
- Location within Kings County, New Brunswick.
- Coordinates: 45.84°N 64.59°W
- Country: Canada
- Province: New Brunswick
- County: Kings County
- Erected: 1840

Area
  - Land: 448.98 km^{2} (173.35 sq mi)

Population (2021)
  - Total: 3,527
  - Density: 7.9/km^{2} (20/sq mi)
  - Change 2016-2021: ▲0.1%
  - Dwellings: 1,480
- Time zone: UTC-4 (AST)
  - Summer (DST): UTC-3 (ADT)

Studholm is a geographic parish in Kings County, New Brunswick, Canada.

Prior to the 2023 governance reform, it formed the local service district of the parish of Studholm, which further included the service area of Lower Millstream. The local service district was a member of Kings Regional Service Commission (RSC8).

== Origin of name ==
The parish was named in honour of Gilfred Studholme, a Loyalist military commander during the American Revolution, who later settled in the area and served on the first Executive Council of New Brunswick.

== History ==
Studholm was erected in 1840 from Sussex Parish. It included Havelock Parish.

In 1859 the eastern polling district was erected as Havelock Parish.

In 1871 part of Havelock along Windgap Brook was returned to Studholm.

== Boundaries ==
Studholm Parish is bounded:

- on the northwest by the Queens County line;
- on the east by a line beginning at a point on the Queens County line where the prolongation of the Miller Road strikes it, then south-southeasterly along the prolongation, Miller Road, and the southerly prolongation of Miller Road to Windgap Brook, then downstream until it strikes the prolongation of the southwestern line of a grant to James Caruth, which is on the southern bank of Windgap Brook and on the eastern side of Jordan Mountain Road, then southeasterly along the prolongation until it strikes the Cardwell Parish line;
- on the southeast by a line beginning at the northeastern corner of a grant to Jacob Smith, about 975 metres north of the junction of Plumweseep Road and Back Road, then running north 66º east; (Note: By the magnet of 1840, when declination in the area was about 18º west of north.)
- on the south by the Kennebecasis River;
- on the west by a line beginning at the mouth of Halfway Brook and running north (Note: By the magnet of 1795, when declination in the area was between 15º and 16º west of north.) past O'Neill Road to the southwestern corner of a grant to Sarah Scovil that straddles Route 870 east of Upper Belleisle, then turning right and running northeasterly to the northeastern corner of a grant to Samuel Foster north of Searsville, the point being about 975 metres past Snyder Road, then generally northeasterly following the lines of grants to a point about 1.6 kilometres southeast of Route 870, on the prolongation of the northeastern line of a grant to Samuel Kierstead near Collina, then turning 90º and running northwesterly along the prolongation, the grant line on the southeastern side of Route 870, and the prolongation of the line until it strikes the Queens County line about 2.5 kilometres southwest of the Pearsonville Road.

== Communities ==
Communities at least partly within the parish; italics indicate a name no longer in official use

- Apohaqui
- Berwick
- Carsonville
- Centreville
- Collina
- Fox Hill
- Gibbon
- Head of Millstream
- Jordan Mountain
- Kierstead Mountain
- Lower Millstream
- Marrtown
- McGregor Brook
- Mount Hebron
- Mount Middleton
- Mount Pisgah
- Newtown
- Parleeville
- Pearsonville
- Pleasant Ridge
- Plumweseep
- Roachville
- Ryan Corner
- Searsville
- Smiths Creek
- Snider Mountain
- Summerfield
- Thompson Corner

== Bodies of water ==
Bodies of water (Note: Not including brooks, ponds or coves.) at least partly in the parish:

- Kennebecasis River
- Millstream River
- Smiths Creek
- Mud Lake

== Demographics ==
=== Population ===
Canada census – Studholm Parish, New Brunswick community profile

	2016	2011
Population	3,522 (-2.5% from 2011)	3,612 (+2.4% from 2006)
Land area	449.37 km^{2} (173.50 sq mi)	449.43 km^{2} (173.53 sq mi)
Population density	7.8/km^{2} (20/sq mi)	8.0/km^{2} (21/sq mi)
Median age	45.9 (M: 45.6, F: 46.0)	43.0 (M: 42.9, F: 43.0)
Private dwellings	1,481 (total)	1,459 (total)
Median household income	$61,248	$53,700

References: 2016 2011

Historical Census Data
Studholm Parish, New Brunswick

Year	Pop.	±%
1991	3,526	—
1996	3,758	+6.6%

Year	Pop.	±%
2001	3,721	−1.0%
2006	3,526	−5.2%

Year	Pop.	±%
2011	3,612	+2.4%
2016	3,522	−2.5%

=== Language ===
Canada Census Mother Tongue - Studholm Parish, New Brunswick
Census	Total	English			French			English & French			Other		
Year	Responses	Count	Trend	Pop %	Count	Trend	Pop %	Count	Trend	Pop %	Count	Trend	Pop %
2011	3,545	3,425	▲2.7%	96.61%	45	▲200.0%	1.27%	15	0.0%	0.42%	60	▲300.0%	1.69%
2006	3,480	3,335	▼7.1%	95.83%	15	▼70.0%	0.43%	15	▲50.0%	0.43%	115	▲1,050.0%	3.30%
2001	3,670	3,590	▼1.0%	97.82%	50	▲42.9%	1.36%	10	0.0%	0.27%	20	▼42.9%	0.54%
1996	3,705	3,625	n/a	97.84%	35	n/a	0.94%	10	n/a	0.27%	35	n/a	0.94%

== Access Routes ==
Highways and numbered routes that run through the parish, including external routes that start or finish at the parish limits:

- Highways
  - Route 1
  - Route 2 (TCH)
  - Route 10
- Principal Routes
  - Route 121
- Secondary Routes:
  - Route 870
  - Route 875
  - Route 880
  - Route 890
- External Routes:
  - None

== See also ==
- List of parishes in New Brunswick
