= Poley Mountain =

Mountain in New Brunswick, Canada

Coordinates: 45°40′24″N 65°22′36″W

- Interactive map of Poley Mountain
- Location: Waterford, New Brunswick, Kings County, New Brunswick, Canada
- Nearest city: Sussex, New Brunswick
- Vertical: 660 ft (200 m)
- Top elevation: 910 ft (280 m)
- Base elevation: 250 ft (76 m)
- Skiable area: 70 acres (0.3 km^{2})
- Trails: 30
- Lift system: 1 pony tow 1 wonder carpet 1 quad chair 1 triple chair
- Lift capacity: 5,800 per hour
- Website: Poley Mountain

Poley Mountain is a ski resort in southern New Brunswick, Canada.

On 9 December 2014, there was a fire in the main lodge of Poley Mountain, which caused estimated damage of over $17 million. Brian Gallant, New Brunswick Premier, tweeted: "Saddened to see the loss of the iconic Poley Mountain lodge this evening, a true loss to N.B."

== See also ==
- List of ski areas and resorts in Canada
