= Titusville, New Brunswick =

Coordinates: 45°29′31″N 65°44′22″W

Titusville is a rural Canadian community in Kings County, New Brunswick. It was settled in 1819 by John, James, Charles and Jonathan Titus.

The village centre is located at the intersection of New Brunswick Route 860 and Titusville Road. Titusville Road connects with New Brunswick Route 820. Titusville has one elementary school, the Hammond River Valley School.

== See also ==
- List of communities in New Brunswick
