= Bessie Ella Hazen =

Canadian-American painter

Bessie Ella Hazen (1862–1946) was a Canadian-born American painter and printmaker.

Born in Waterford, New Brunswick, (Note: Some sources state that she was born in Waterford, Connecticut instead.) Hazen studied at Columbia University and at the University of California, Los Angeles. Among her awards and honors were several second prizes in watercolor at the Arizona State Fair, in 1916, 1917, and 1919; first prize for realism in painting at the Art Teachers Association of Los Angeles, in 1924; a gold medal for watercolor at West Coast Arts, in 1926; and first prizes from the Ebell Club of Los Angeles, in 1931 and 1932. Groups to which she belonged included the California Art Club, the California Watercolor Society, the California Art Teachers Association, Women Painters of the West, the Arthur Wesley Dow Foundation, and the Pacific Art Association, and her work is in the collection of the Los Angeles County Museum of Art, among others. She lived and taught in Los Angeles.
