= Hammondvale, New Brunswick =

Rural community in New Brunswick, Canada

Coordinates: 45°34′N 65°30′W

Hammondvale is a Canadian rural community in Kings County, New Brunswick.

== History ==
Located in Hammond Parish (source), the community was originally named Upham Vale. It was renamed in 1870. In 1871 it had a population of 200, in 1898 it had a population of 250.

The community is 6.38 km NE from the community of Hillsdale and 3.19 km NW from Poodiac. The cave known as "Kitt's Cave", is also located in this community. It was named because it is one of the few known locations where beavers raise their young deep inside a cave in the spring. The cave is 141 m long and 8 m deep.

Route 111 turns north from Fundy-St. Martins through the community. The Hammond River rises in the Caledonia Highlands near the community.

== See also ==
- List of communities in New Brunswick
