= New Brunswick Route 860 =

Highway in New Brunswick, Canada

Coordinates: 45.478429°N 65.786819°W

Route 860

Route information
- Maintained by New Brunswick Department of Transportation
- Length: 40 km (25 mi)

Major junctions
- North end: Route 865 in Clover Hill
- South end: Route 111 in Wells

Location
- Country: Canada
- Province: New Brunswick

Highway system
- Provincial highways in New Brunswick; Former routes
← Route 855	→ Route 865

Route 860 is a 40-kilometre (25 mi) long mostly north–south secondary highway in the south-western portion of New Brunswick, Canada.

== Route description ==
Most of the route is in Kings County.

The route's northeastern terminus is in Clover Hill at Route 865, where it travels southeast through a mostly wooded area to Salt Springs. From here, the route follows a river through Salina to Titusville. The route then follows the Hammond River to Smithtown passing through French Village, New Brunswick then from there crosses the river, by the Hammond River Covered Bridge #2 passing the bottom of the stockfarm road and continuing on French Village Road which was named for its leading path into French Village in the early 1700s. The route then passes Bay Lake and ends in the community of Wells at Route 111.
