= Cornhill, New Brunswick =

Human settlement in Canada

Coordinates: 45.910306°N 65.345833°W

Location of Cornhill in New Brunswick

Cornhill, formerly spelt Corn Hill, is a community in Kings County near the villages of Havelock and Three Rivers in the Canadian province of New Brunswick. The first settlers of Cornhill were mainly from the United Kingdom. These settlers worked the land and made way for future generations of Cornhill families.

Cornhill was originally called "The Ridge". In the mid 19th century the name was changed to Corn Ridge and by 1890 was again changed to Corn Hill. The name may have come from the Cornhill area of Northumberland, England. Cornhill is also a well known street in London upon which the Bank of England stands.

The first settlers of Cornhill were given grants from the government to own land, which they had to achieve certain objectives to retain. The grantee had to clear ten acres of land within 3 years and build a residence of certain dimensions. The farmers also had to make a certain amount of roadway per year. The settlers quickly learned that the land they had been given was very fertile. By 1871, the population of Corn Hill was approximately 300.

The Historical Economy of Cornhill

Since Cornhill's early beginnings, farming has been the main source of income for the village. Early farms consisted of a few cows, chickens, a pig or two, and some sheep. Everything was accomplished through manual labor. These farms eventually became very prosperous, and Cornhill became a center of wealth in the area with Cornhill farmers lending money to those in surrounding communities. One specialized industry from farming was cheese-making. Cheese-making factories were built in Cornhill which employed many people for many years. In 1899, the Corn Hill Cheese Company was processing 9000 pounds of milk per day. Cheese sold at the time for 10 cents a pound. Other industries in Cornhill were maple sugar farming, selling blueberries, blacksmithing, grist mills, and stores.

Current Economy of Cornhill

The current economy in Cornhill is still largely driven by farming. The van Waldow dairy farm is the biggest in the area. There are several types of farms in the area including dairy beef, swine, chickens, and sheep farms. The Corn Hill Nursery and Cedar Cafe are well known destinations in the community, providing a wide range of locally grown horticultural material and several annual events celebrating roses and grapes.

Cornhill is home to the Corn Hill Bicycle Festival, which is a celebration of rural bicycling.

== See also ==
- List of communities in New Brunswick
