= Barnesville, New Brunswick =

Coordinates: 47.700°N 65.167°W

Barnesville is a rural community in the province of New Brunswick within the country of Canada. There are several small brooks, the Hammond River, and a lake in the area often used for sport fishing.

== Population ==
Data on population is not collected by Statistics Canada.

== Location ==
Barnesville is located along Route 820 in Kings County, New Brunswick. Saint John is 40 kilometres away and is the closest city. Hampton is 20 kilometres away and is the closest town. Additional surrounding rural areas include Upham, Primrose, and Grove Hill.

== History ==
Barnesville was settled by John Barnes in approximately 1820. The community was first called South Stream and later changed to honour Thomas G. Barnes, the first postmaster. In 1898 Barnesville was a small farming community and had 1 post office, 2 stores, 2 churches.

== Education ==
Students attend either Loch Lomond Elementary School or Hammond River Valley Elementary School for Grades Kindergarten to Grade 5. Students commute to Forest Hills Middle School (French Immersion) or Hampton Middle School for Grades 6-8. And Grades 9-12 at either a high school located in Saint John or Hampton High School.

== Amenities and industry ==
There is one store and three churches.

A commercial greenhouse supplies flower baskets for local garden centers and retail stores and employs several people from the surrounding area.

A community garden was formed in the spring of 2015 by a group of local volunteers, with 30 allotments in use and 13 participants in the first year. It is located behind the Presbyterian church. The group offers free and low-cost gardening workshops for the public.

Only one fully operational farm - specializing in beef cattle - remains in the community.

== See also ==
- List of communities in New Brunswick
