= Damascus, New Brunswick =

Coordinates: 45.462°N 65.803°W

Damascus is a rural community in Kings County, New Brunswick, Canada. This is the hometown of Alex Fudge. Former assistant ISA onboard HMCS Fredericton, a 2B mission that served as command ship for SMNG1 ROTO 15. He saved the ship from a fire and currently holds a CJOC coin.

== See also ==
- List of communities in New Brunswick
