= Cassidy Lake (New Brunswick) =

Lake in New Brunswick, Canada

- Location within New Brunswick
- Location: Upham Parish, Kings County, New Brunswick
- Coordinates: 45°34′50.6″N 65°35′6.1″W
- Type: natural
- Primary outflows: Lake Brook
- Basin countries: Canada
- Max. length: ca. 1.72 km (1.07 mi)
- Max. width: ca. 739 m (2,425 ft)
- Average depth: 1 ft (0.30 m)
- Max. depth: 30 ft (9.1 m)
- References: Cassidy Lake of New Brunswick

Cassidy Lake is a lake in Kings County, New Brunswick, Canada.

== Location ==
Cassidy Lake is located in the community of Clover Hill, surrounded by rolling hills in the Caledonia Highlands, 8 kilometres (5.0 mi) southeast of the village of Valley Waters. Neighbouring communities are Poodiac, Salt Springs, and Southfield. As of 2008 there are less than 30 families living in the immediate area. Numerous cottages dot the lake's shores, along with several camps and a youth drug rehabilitation centre.

== Lake, wildlife, and recreation ==
The lake is approximately one kilometre in length and half a kilometre wide. The water is clean, and the lake is fed by two large brooks, as well as surface runoff and numerous underwater springs. At the north east end of the lake the water is very shallow and marshy. This area contains most of the wildlife around the lake. There are many types of birds, including bald eagles, loons, cormorants and king fishers, several beaver dams, and mainly chain pickerel, splake, and sunfish, there are also Smallmouth bass, and speckled trout. Although small, the lake is a popular spot to fish, swim and boat. Every year in May the Fish and Game Society holds a fishing derby which always attracts a crowd.

== Area history ==
Originally called DeForest Lake, it was later fdnamed Cassidy Lake after settler Francis Edward Cassidy. His original homestead on Cassidy Hill was burned down many years ago, but the foundation can still be found, as well as the apple orchards, cemetery and church, which is only open to worshipers for one day every August.

At one time there was a saw mill on the lake, near what is now Route 865. The Kilpatrick family also owned a general store and millinery on the same road. There is no commerce in the area at present.

== Potash mining ==
Potash is mined to the south east of the lake, the mine was opened by Dennison and was later purchased by the Potash Corporation of Saskatchewan. In the late 1990s areas of the mine began to flood, shortly after it was allowed to flood completed and production was terminated. Today the mine acts as water storage for its sister operation in Penobsquis, New Brunswick, which has also been leaking for some years. By trucking the water to Cassidy Lake, and other sites the Penobsquis Mine has been able to maintain production.

== See also ==
- List of lakes of New Brunswick
