= Sussex Corner, New Brunswick =

Sussex Corner
- Location of Sussex Corner in New Brunswick
- Coordinates: 45.711°N 65.482°W
- Country: Canada
- Province: New Brunswick
- County: Kings
- Town: Sussex

Area
  - Land: 9.32 km^{2} (3.60 sq mi)

Population (2021)
  - Total: 1,458
  - Density: 156.4/km^{2} (405/sq mi)
  - Change (2016–21): ▼0.2%
- Time zone: UTC-4 (Atlantic (AST))
  - Summer (DST): UTC-3 (ADT)
- Website: Official website

Sussex Corner is a neighbourhood in the town of Sussex in Kings County in south-central New Brunswick, Canada. It held village status prior to 2023.

== History ==
Southeast of the town of Sussex, with which it shares a border, the village was settled by Loyalists during the American Revolution. It is part of what was originally called Pleasant Valley due to the weather and natural wealth it contains.

Sussex Corner was home to the fastest half-mile horse racetrack in North America during the mid-19th century. The track was one of many thriving enterprises operated by businessman and sportsman Hugh McMonagle. Among his many contributions to the area, McMonagle introduced the first Holstein cattle to the region, leading to its strong reputation of being the Dairy Capital of the Maritimes. He also brought in the first Morgan horses to New Brunswick and was a strong promoter of agricultural progress for his community.

Sussex Corner was near the halfway point of the stagecoach route between Saint John and Moncton. The Pitfield Elm, a large elm tree outside the Spicer Inn, marked this point along the route.

Sussex Vale was the economic centre of Kings County in the mid-19th century, with growth slowing after the railroad arrived. McMonagle protested the original plans for the tracks to cross his land and racetrack, and so the railroad was built two miles west of the community. Area businesses soon moved next to the new train station to benefit from the travelers, and the emphasis moved from Sussex Vale to the growing community of Sussex.

This history is told in the three murals created in the community. They are part of the 26 murals painted by internationally renowned artists during the summers of 2006 and 2007 that make Sussex and Sussex Corner the Mural Capital of Atlantic Canada.

The village became an important road junction during the 20th century and was renamed Sussex Corner.

On 1 January 2023, Sussex Corner amalgamated with the town of Sussex. The community's name remains in official use.

== Demographics ==
In the 2021 Census of Population conducted by Statistics Canada, Sussex Corner had a population of 1,458 living in 653 of its 674 total private dwellings, a change of −0.2% from its 2016 population of 1,461. With a land area of 9.32 km^{2} (3.60 sq mi), it had a population density of 156.4/km^{2} (405.2/sq mi) in 2021.

== See also ==
- List of communities in New Brunswick
