= New Brunswick Route 820 =

Highway in New Brunswick, Canada

Coordinates: 45.428877°N 65.746136°W

Route 820

Route information
- Maintained by New Brunswick Department of Transportation
- Length: 30 km (19 mi)

Major junctions
- East end: Route 111 in Upperton
- West end: Route 111 in Loch Lomond

Location
- Country: Canada
- Province: New Brunswick

Highway system
- Provincial highways in New Brunswick; Former routes
← Route 795	→ Route 825

Route 820 is a 30-kilometre (19 mi) long mostly east–west secondary highway in the southwestern portion of New Brunswick, Canada.

== Route description ==
Most of the route is in Kings County.

The route's eastern terminus is in Loch Lomond on the east bank of Loch Lomond, where it is known as Barnesville Rd. It travels in a northerly direction to Baxters Corner. From here, the road travels mostly northeast to Second Lake, Third Lake, and Primrose. The route continues to Barnesville, crosses the Back River, and continues along the north bank to Upham. After passing Drummonds Lake, Route 820 ends in Upperton at Route 111.
