= Campbell Settlement, Kings County =

Coordinates: 46.010346°N 67.346106°W

See also Campbell Settlement, York County

Location of Campbell Settlement in New Brunswick

Campbell Settlement is a settlement in Kings County, New Brunswick between Nackawic between Route 595 and Route 105.

== See also ==
- List of communities in New Brunswick
