= Head of Millstream, New Brunswick =

Community in New Brunswick, Canada

Coordinates: 45.885°N 65.527°W

Location of Head of Millstream in New Brunswick

Head of Millstream is a community in the Canadian province of New Brunswick, located in Studholm Parish, Kings County.

== See also ==
- List of communities in New Brunswick
