= Mount Middleton, New Brunswick =

Community in New Brunswick, Canada

Coordinates: 45.785°N 65.550°W

Location of Mount Middleton in New Brunswick

Mount Middleton is a settlement in New Brunswick, within Studholm Parish.

== History ==
In 1904, the town numbered 140 residents with a church, post office, and cheese and butter factory.

== See also ==
- List of communities in New Brunswick
