= Lakeside, New Brunswick =

Former Canadian community in Kings County, New Brunswick

Lakeside is a former Canadian community located in Kings County, New Brunswick, Canada. It is now part of the town of Hampton.

== See also ==
- List of communities in New Brunswick
