= Penobsquis =

Coordinates: 47°40′8″N 65°5′57″W

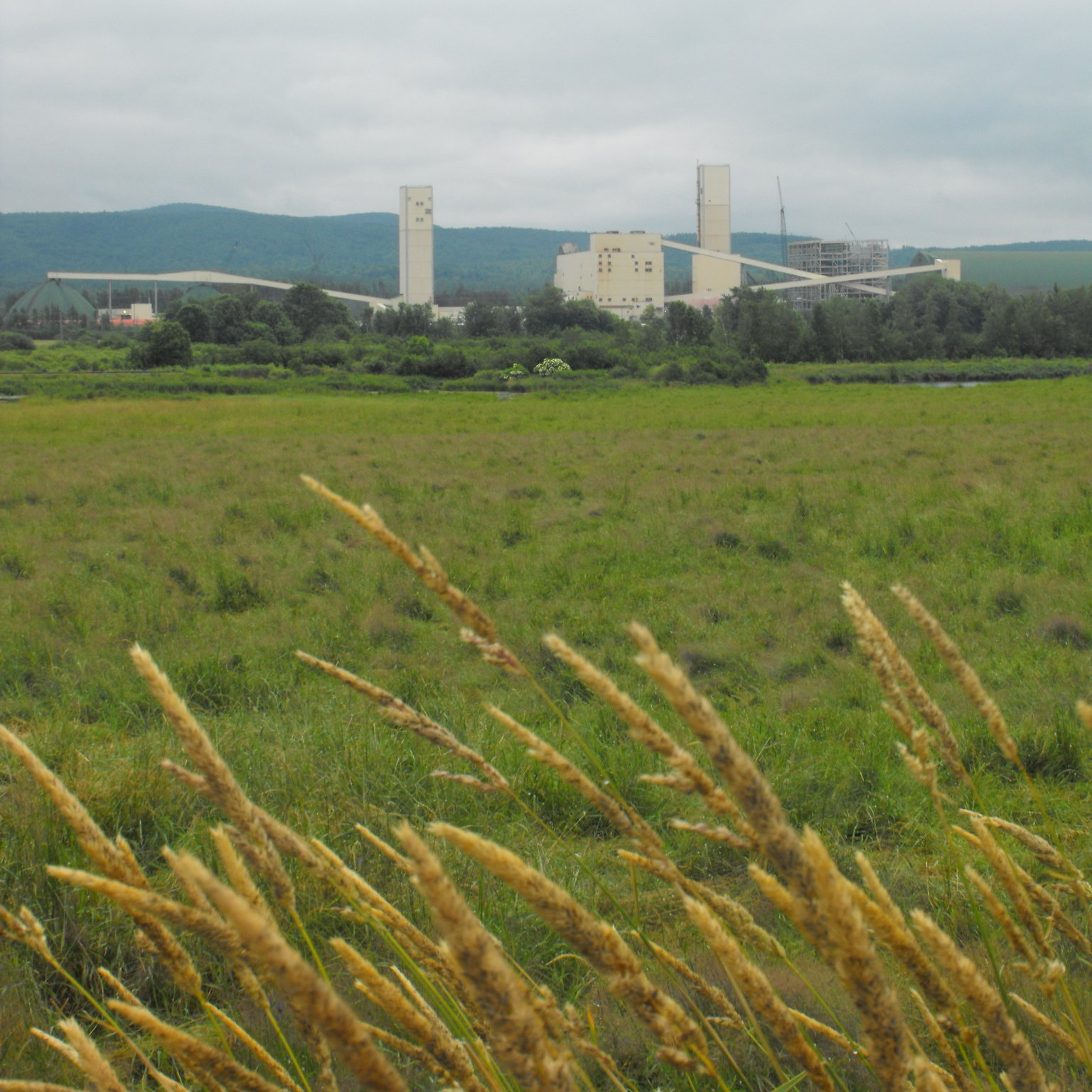
Potash mine in Penobsquis. headframes.

Penobsquis (/pɛˈnɒbskwɪs/; 2001 pop.: 1,382) is a Canadian village in New Brunswick.

Penobsquis is a blend of Mi’kmaq terms for stone and brook.

== Animaland Park ==
Animaland Park, a collection of concrete sculptures of animals that was once a roadside attraction, is located near Penobsquis. In 2018, the land where the park sits was opened as a campground. The statues remain as a feature of the new campground.

== Water supply ==
Penobsquis is the site of a large potash deposit which is mined by the New Brunswick division of the Potash Corporation of Saskatchewan (PCS). The company announced expansion plans in 2007 which will see a second mine open within several years. The community also hosts several natural gas wells known as the McCully Field. The wells are being developed by Corridor Resources Inc., some in partnership with PotashCorp. Penobsquis is also the proposed site of an Eco-Industrial Business Park to be known as Fundy Green Park.

More than 50 homes in the Penobsquis area lost their well water over a number of years. Many blame this problem on the water that is flowing in the Potash Mine as the mine has had water inflow at rates up to 1,800 gallons per minute. The loss of water is also alleged to be the fault of 3-D and 2-D seismic testing done by PCS and Corridor Resources, although the cause has never been conclusively shown. More than a dozen households have complained to the New Brunswick Mining Commissioner for damage from the loss of water and mining subsidence.

Drinking water was delivered to homes affected by dry wells by PCS, and non-potable water by the province of New Brunswick. Many residents allege that the provincially delivered water is a cause of rashes and other health problems. Other residents blame the rashes and lung problems on the natural gas flares. Neither of these allegations have been proven.

A new water system was put in by the province with federal gas tax funds, residents are now forced to pay for water.

In October 2018, a press release by PotashCorp New Brunswick announced the closure of the Penobsquis potash mine at the end of November 2018.

== Notable people ==
Winston Bronnum

== See also ==
- List of communities in New Brunswick
