= Havelock, New Brunswick =

Canadian rural community in Kings County

Coordinates: 46.000°N 65.317°W

Location of Havelock in New Brunswick

Havelock is a rural community in the Canadian province of New Brunswick, located in Kings County. Havelock is at the junction of Route 885 and Route 880. There is a small public airport nearby.

The community is situated on a large lime deposit and its extraction has driven the local economy, beginning with a Lafarge cement plant constructed in the 1960s and current mothballed since the early 1990s. Graymont operates a lime quarry and kiln to supply eastern Canada and New England with 300 tonnes per day.

== History ==
Havelock was named after Sir Henry Havelock and was previously known as Butternut Ridge.

== Notable people ==
- Lily May Perry, botanist
- George McCready Price, creationist

== See also ==
- List of communities in New Brunswick
