= Berwick, New Brunswick =

Rural community in New Brunswick, Canada

Coordinates: 45.778444°N 65.595972°W

Location of Berwick in New Brunswick

Berwick is a rural community in Kings County, New Brunswick, Canada. It is situated along Route 10.

== See also ==
- List of communities in New Brunswick
