= Mount Hebron, New Brunswick =

Coordinates: 45.816°N 65.501°W

Location of Mount Hebron in New Brunswick

Mount Hebron is a settlement in New Brunswick.

== See also ==
- List of communities in New Brunswick
