= Hammond River (New Brunswick) =

- Etymology: Andrew Hamond
- Native name: Nuhwig'ewauk (Malecite-Passamaquoddy)

Location
- Country: Canada
- Province: New Brunswick
- County: Kings County

Physical characteristics
- Source
  - location: Lisson Settlement, Sussex Parish
  - coordinates: 45°36′44″N 65°24′41″W
  - elevation: 287 m (942 ft)
- Mouth: Kennebecasis River
  - location: near Nauwigewauk, Hampton Parish
  - coordinates: 45°30′14″N 65°54′28″W
  - elevation: 11 m (36 ft)
- Length: 40 km (25 mi)

The Hammond River is a tributary of the Kennebecasis River in New Brunswick, Canada. It runs approximately 40 kilometres (25 mi) in southern Kings County along the border of Saint John County. It rises in the Caledonia Highlands near the rural community of Hammondvale and runs in a westerly direction to its junction with the Kennebecasis River. Near the mouth of the river, at the rural community of Nauwigewauk, the river is joined by a short tributary draining Darlings Lake.

The Hammond River is one of the few rivers in the world that still has spawning Atlantic salmon. It was named for Andrew Hamond, Lieutenant Governor of Nova Scotia from 1781 to 1782, who owned land in the area.

== See also ==
- List of bodies of water of New Brunswick
