= Bloomfield, Kings County, New Brunswick =

Community in New Brunswick, Canada

Coordinates: 45.577°N 65.754°W

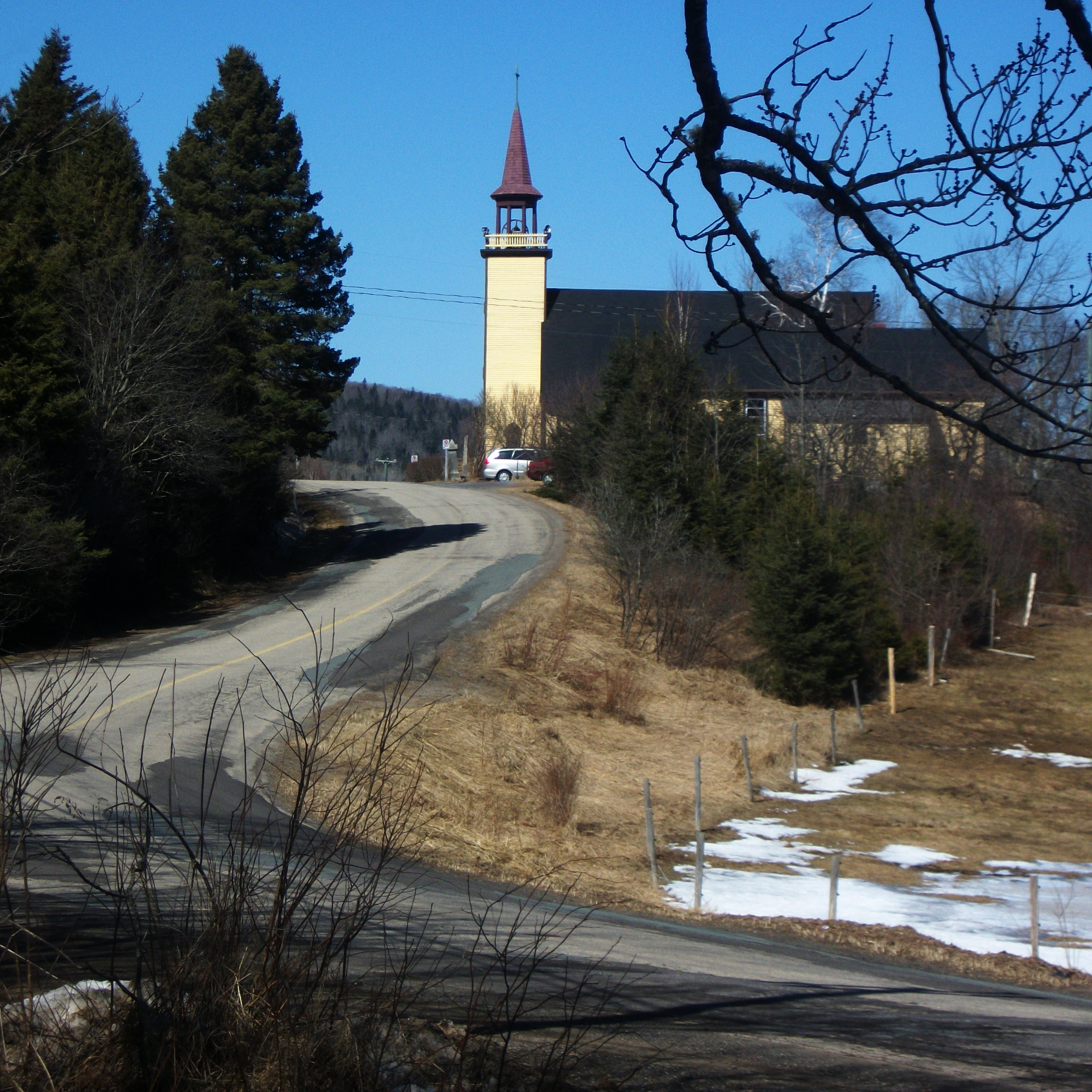
Bloomfield

Bloomfield is a rural community in Kings County, New Brunswick, Canada. It is located mostly along Route 121.

== See also ==
- List of communities in New Brunswick
