= Bloomfield Ridge, Kings County, New Brunswick =

Community in New Brunswick, Canada

Coordinates: 45.567°N 65.696°W

Location of Bloomfield Ridge in Kings County, New Brunswick

Bloomfield Ridge is a community in the Canadian province of New Brunswick, located in Kings County.

== See also ==
- List of communities in New Brunswick
