= New Brunswick Route 865 =

Highway in New Brunswick, Canada

Coordinates: 45.603049°N 65.640135°W

Route 865

Route information
- Maintained by New Brunswick Department of Transportation
- Length: 18 km (11 mi)

Major junctions
- North end: Route 1 / Route 124 in Valley Waters
- South end: Route 111 in Hillsdale

Location
- Country: Canada
- Province: New Brunswick

Highway system
- Provincial highways in New Brunswick; Former routes
← Route 860	→ Route 870

Route 865 is a 17.6-kilometre (10.9 mi) long mostly north–south secondary highway in the south-western portion of New Brunswick, Canada.

== Route description ==
Most of the route is in Kings County.

The route's northeastern terminus is in Valley Waters at the intersection of Route 124 and Route 1, where it travels southeast through a mostly wooded area to Southfield Road. From here, the route follows a river past Southfield, Cassidy Lake, and Camp Tulakadik to the eastern terminus of Route 860 in Clover Hill. The route ends in the community of Hillsdale at Route 111.
