= New Brunswick Route 121 =

Highway in New Brunswick, Canada

Route 121

Route information
- Maintained by New Brunswick Department of Transportation
- Length: 40.08 km (24.90 mi)
- Existed: 1968.–present

Major junctions
- West end: Route 1 in Hampton
- Route 100 in Hampton; Route 1 in Sussex
- East end: Route 111 in Sussex

Location
- Country: Canada
- Province: New Brunswick
- Major cities: Hampton, Valley Waters, Apohaqui

Highway system
- Provincial highways in New Brunswick; Former routes
← Route 120	→ Route 122

Route 121 is a mostly north–south provincial highway in the Canadian province of New Brunswick, although it's signed as an east–west highway. The road runs from the Route 1 intersection in Hampton. The road is approximately 40 kilometres, and services small, otherwise isolated, rural communities. In these areas, the highway is often unofficially referred to as "Main Street." The road parallels Route 1 and follows the Kennebecasis River. The highway starts in Hampton as Hall Road, then Main Street. It is also called Main Street in Sussex.

== Intersecting routes ==
- Begins merged with Route 100 over exit 158 at Route 1 in Hampton
- separates from highway 100 on Main St in Hampton
- Route 845 in Hampton
- Route 855 in Bloomfield
- Route 124 in Valley Waters
- Route 880 in Apohaqui
- Route 1 in Sussex
- Ends at Route 111 in Sussex

== River crossings ==
- Kennebecasis River in Hampton
- Millstream River in Apohaqui
- Kennebecasis River, in Sussex

== Communities along the Route ==
- Hampton
- Central Norton
- Valley Waters
- Riverbank
- Apohaqui
- Fox Hill
- Sussex

== See also ==
- List of New Brunswick provincial highways
