= Hampton, New Brunswick =

Hampton
- Town
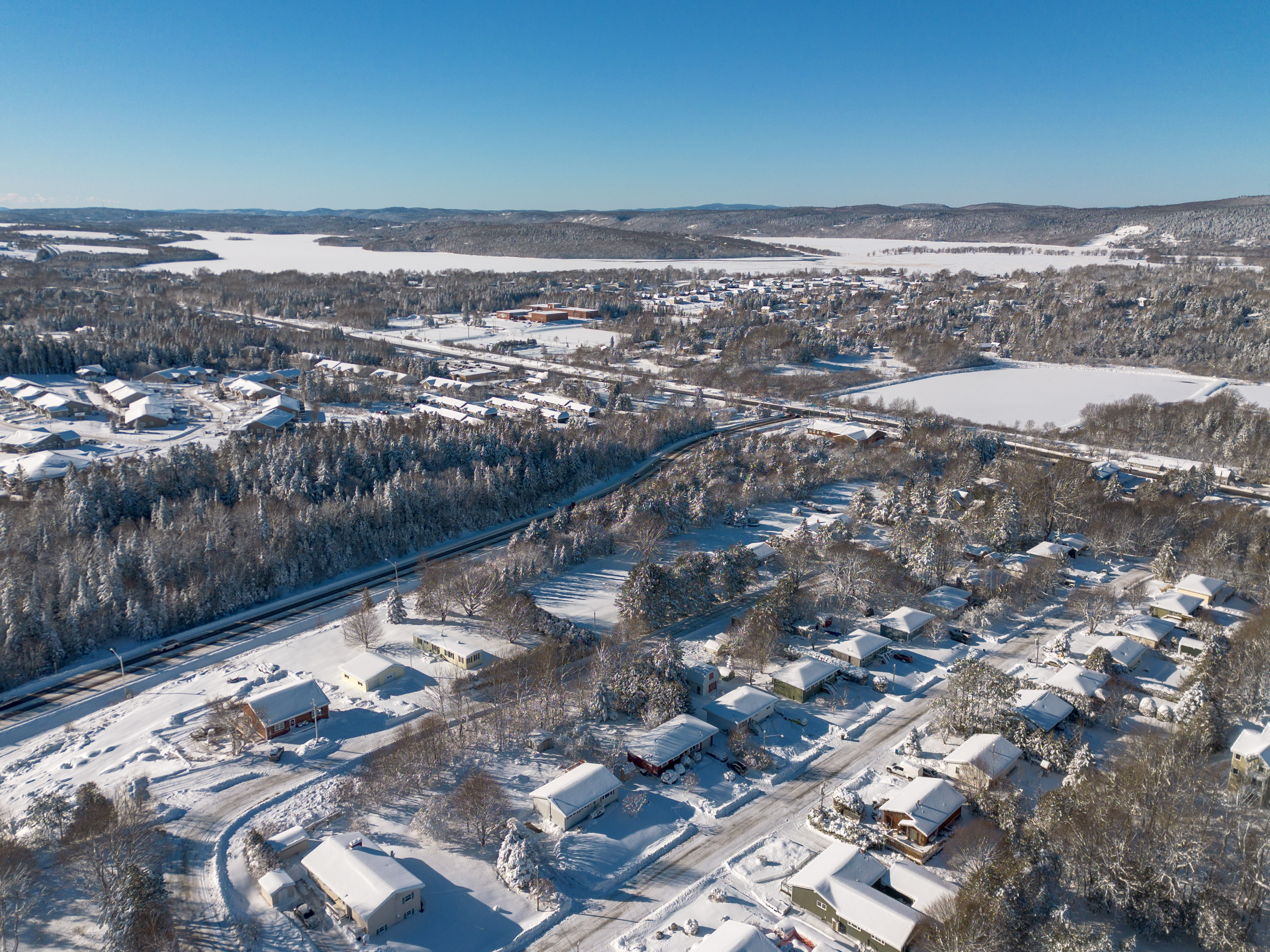
- Hampton in 2026

- Coat of arms
- Motto: "It's in our Nature"
- Location within New Brunswick
- Coordinates: 45.51507°N 65.83368°W
- Country: Canada
- Province: New Brunswick
- County: Kings
- Parish: Hampton Parish
- Founded: September 1783
- Incorporated Village: 1966
- Town: 1991

Government
  - Mayor: Robert "Dewey" Doucet
  - MLA: John Herron
  - MP: Rob Moore

Area
  - Land: 20.97 km^{2} (8.10 sq mi)
- Elevation: 1 to 77 m (3.3 to 252.6 ft)

Population (2021)
  - Total: 4,395
  - Density: 209.6/km^{2} (543/sq mi)
  - Change (2016–21): ▲2.5%
- Time zone: UTC-4 (Atlantic (AST))
  - Summer (DST): UTC-3 (ADT)
- Canadian Postal code: E5N
- Area code: 506
- Telephone Exchange: 832, 943
- Website: www.townofhampton.ca

Hampton is a town in Kings County, New Brunswick, Canada.

Located on the Kennebecasis River 30 kilometres northeast of Saint John, Hampton is the shire town of Kings County. It functioned as the seat of county government between 1870 and 1966 (when county governments were abolished) and is today a service centre for the central Kennebecasis River valley, as well as being a suburb of Saint John. Hampton also has its own RCMP detachment that was built in 1999.

On 1 January 2023, Hampton was greatly enlarged by annexing all or part of four local service districts; revised census figures from have not been released.

== History ==
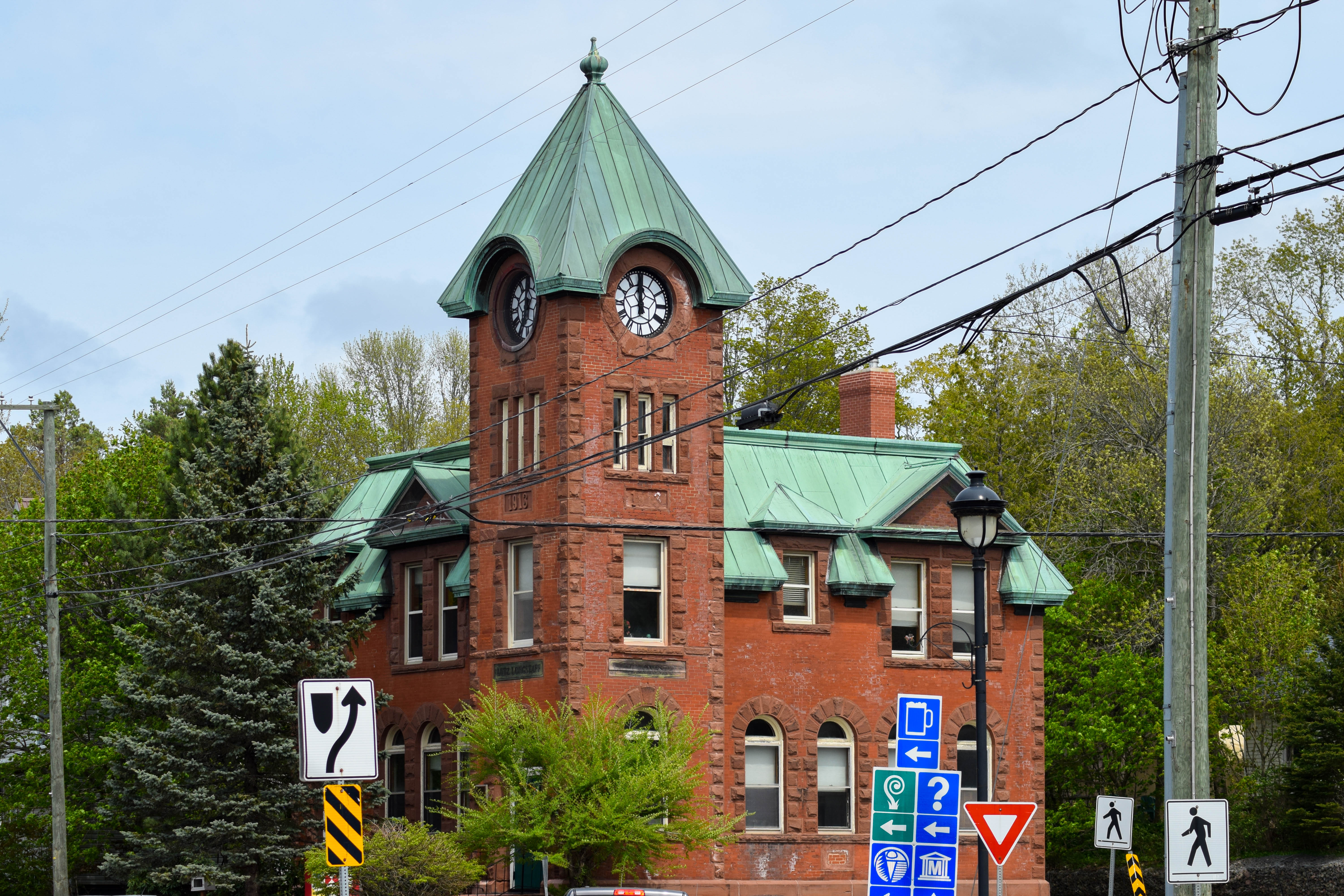
Old Hampton Post Office

The area in which the town of Hampton is located had been inhabited by French settlers in the 1600s while First Nations had called it home since time immemorial. The United Empire Loyalists were the first to establish permanent settlements in the area shortly after arriving in 1783. It was in 1785 that Kings County was established in NB and in 1795 the Parish of Hampton was created out of parts of Sussex and Kingston parishes. One area of the town, known now as the Lower Norton Shore, was originally known as the Yankee Shore because of all the Loyalist immigrants in the 1780s.

By 1871 Hampton had a population of 250. By 1904 it grew to 800. These people had a post office, three stores, three hotels, a match factory, a grist mill, a saw mill and three churches. At this time was included the community of Hampton Ferry (population 150) and the village of Ossekeag (Hampton Station) which had a population of 500 and was home to a post office, seven stores, a hotel, a machine shop and four churches. It was also the site of a station on the Intercontinental Railway and a junction on the Hampton-St. Martin's railway. The name Ossekeag is Mi'kmaq for "marshy brook"

Hampton was incorporated as a village in 1966. It became a town in 1991.

Hampton is located in the Kennebecasis River valley, where the river flows into a wide flood plain. The Hampton Marshes contain a diverse assortment of wildlife and are one of the town's major tourist attractions. Although Hampton is located far upstream from the Bay of Fundy, its high tides have some effect there nonetheless. The marshes flood every spring during the run-off, and then the water levels vary during the course of the year, offering a constantly changing landscape for different animals, birds and fish. In late years, the marshes have suffered from an invasion of Purple Loosestrife.

The old Hampton Gaol at 45.523678°N 65.8256°W, built around 1870, was designated protected in 1976 as a New Brunswick Provincial Historic Site.

== Notable people ==
The town of Hampton is the birthplace of: John Peters Humphrey, (one of the drafters of the Universal Declaration of Human Rights); artist and sculptor John Hooper; MLA Bev Harrison; and NHL referee Tim Peel.

Steve Fossett once made a crash landing outside Hampton, in an aborted attempt to be the first balloonist to fly solo non-stop around the world. The Solo Challenger departed Stratobowl, South Dakota, on January 8, 1996. Fossett called it "the most embarrassing day of my life," but a woman from the town thought otherwise. Forcing her way through the crowd that gathered, she offered him a miniature Canadian flag. "Welcome to Canada," she said. Fossett sighed wearily and thanked her.

As the shire town of the county, Hampton is also home to the Kings Co. Museum and Gaol.

Canadian actor Donald Sutherland lived in present-day Hampton for the first six years of his life, before moving back to Saint John.

== Government ==
Hampton is administered by an elected mayor and town council. Currently, the council consists of: Mayor: Robert "Dewey" Doucet; Deputy Mayor: Jeremy Salgado; Councillors: Ken Chorley, Karin Boyé, Sheree Trecartin and Kim Tompkins

John Herron (Liberal) represents Hampton in the provincial legislature.

At the federal level, Hampton is located in the riding of Fundy Royal. The current Member of Parliament is Rob Moore of the Conservative Party of Canada.

== Education ==
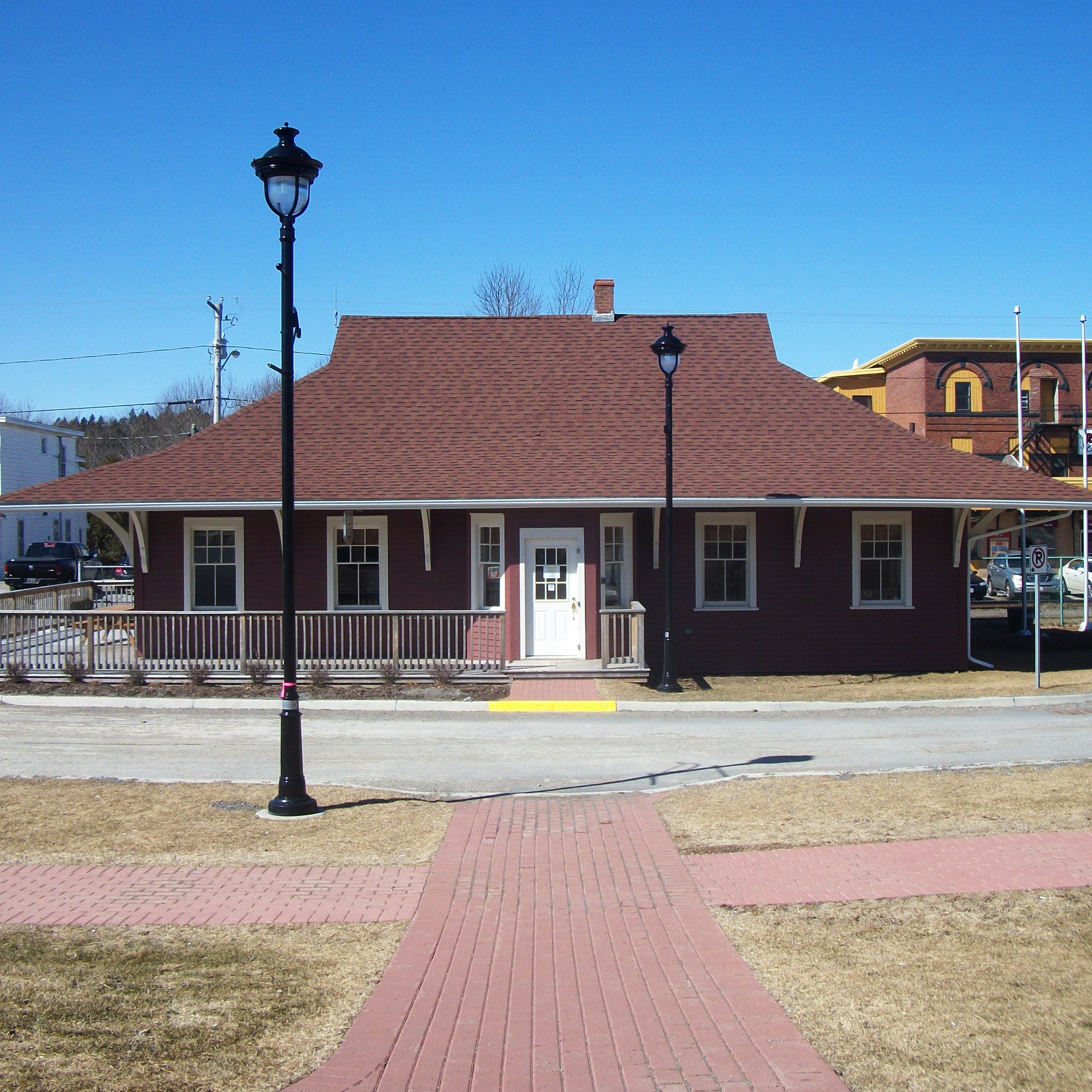
Hampton station is now a tourist bureau.

Hampton, New Brunswick has four different schools: Dr. A.T. Leatherbarrow Primary School, Hampton Elementary School, Hampton Middle School, and Hampton High School. Their High School is represented by a variety of athletic teams including basketball, soccer, golf, football, hockey, and track and field. Their athletic mascot is Frostbite.

== Transportation ==
Highways in Hampton include Route 1, Route 100, Route 121, and Route 845. There is a modern roundabout in the town centre.

The community obtained rail service in 1859 with the opening of the European and North American Railway to Saint John, connecting to Moncton in 1860. Passenger service continued until 1994. The tracks are still in use for freight, as Canadian National Railways operate them as a secondary mainline. There was also rail service to St. Martins in the late nineteenth century on the Hampton and St. Martins Railway.

== Demographics ==
In the 2021 Census of Population conducted by Statistics Canada, Hampton had a population of 4,395 living in 1,740 of its 1,804 total private dwellings, a change of 2.5% from its 2016 population of 4,289. With a land area of 20.97 km^{2} (8.10 sq mi), it had a population density of 209.6/km^{2} (542.8/sq mi) in 2021.

== Athletics ==
Like a lot of other towns and cities in New Brunswick, Hampton has a lot of youth athletic and other athletic organizations and teams to offer. Three of the four schools in Hampton also offers organized school teams in a bunch of different sports. Hampton Elementary School, Hampton Middle School, and Hampton High School are the three schools in Hampton to have such teams.

The only sport that Hampton Elementary School has to offer in terms of organized sports is track and field. The school gets students from their fifth grade classes who are interested in participating to go to Sussex Elementary School to compete against other elementary schools in the area. This event typically takes place in the month of June. The school's team name is the Hampton Hawks.

Hampton Middle School has a lot of teams to participate in Anglophone School District South competitions against other middle schools. The sports that they have to offer are basketball, badminton, volleyball, soccer, cross country, and track and field. Their school's team name is the Hampton Wildcats.

Hampton High School is Hampton's only secondary school. They participate in the NBIAA, or the New Brunswick Interscholastic Athletic Association. They have numerous sports teams. The list includes hockey, baseball, basketball, football, soccer, volleyball, badminton, rugby, cross country running, and track and field. Their school's team name is the Hampton Huskies. Their mascot is Frostbite.

Hampton is home of the Hampton Bulldogs, which is the town's most popular sports team. The team plays hockey, and their home arena is the Hampton Community Centre. They play in the New Brunswick Central Midget Hockey League.

== Population ==
Population trend

Census	Population	Change (%)
2016	4,289	▼0.1%
2011	4,292	▲7.2%
2006	4,004	▲0.2%
2001	3,997	▼2.0%
1996	4,081	▲6.2%
1991	3,826	▲12.4%
1986	3,405	▲7.8%
1981	3,141	N/A

Religious make-up (2001)

Religion	Population	Pct (%)
Protestant	2,345	59.22%
Catholic	1,105	27.90%
Christian N.I.E.	60	1.52%
Muslim	10	0.25%
Other religions	10	0.25%
No religious affiliation	445	11.24%

Income (2006)

Income type	By CAD
Per capita income	$27,163
Median Household Income	$63,598
Median Family Income	$69,222

Mother tongue language (2006)

Language	Population	Pct (%)
English	3,800	96.45%
French	110	2.79%
English and French	10	0.25%
Other languages	15	0.38%

== Photo gallery ==
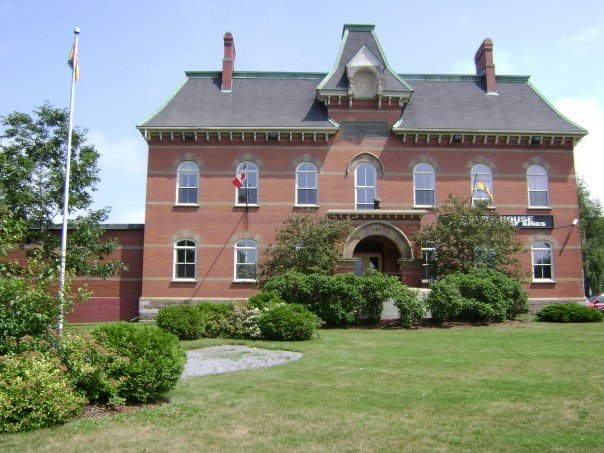
The Kings County courthouse now used as the Town Hall in the center of Hampton

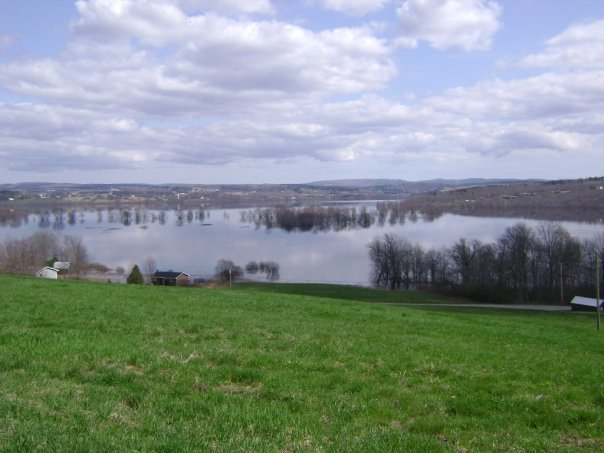
A view of the marsh, showing the high water in April 2008

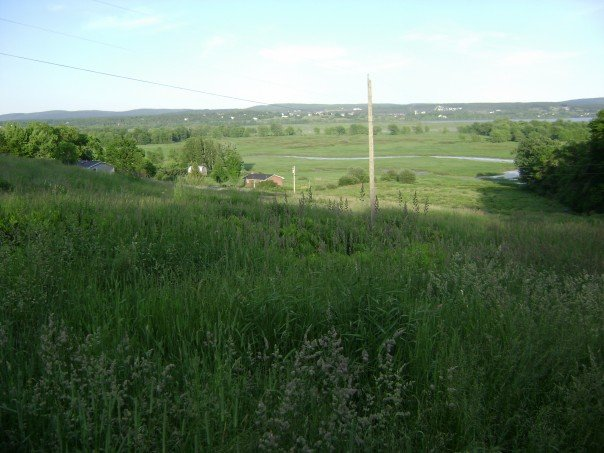
The same area of the marsh in June, demonstrating the difference in water level

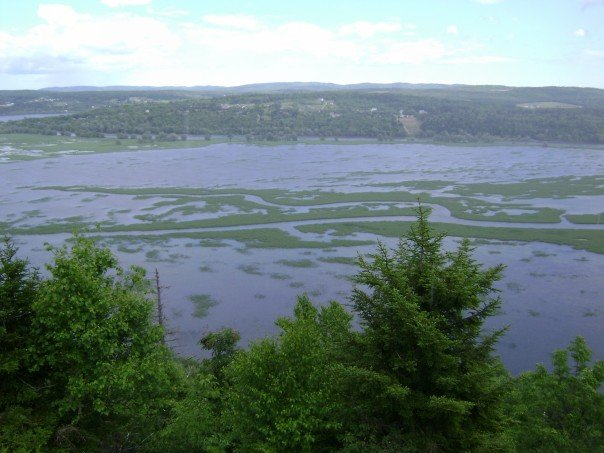
The lower end of the marsh, looking across to Darlings Island
