= Kings County, New Brunswick =

County in New Brunswick, Canada

Coordinates: 45°39′37.5″N 65°47′23.4″W

Kings
- County
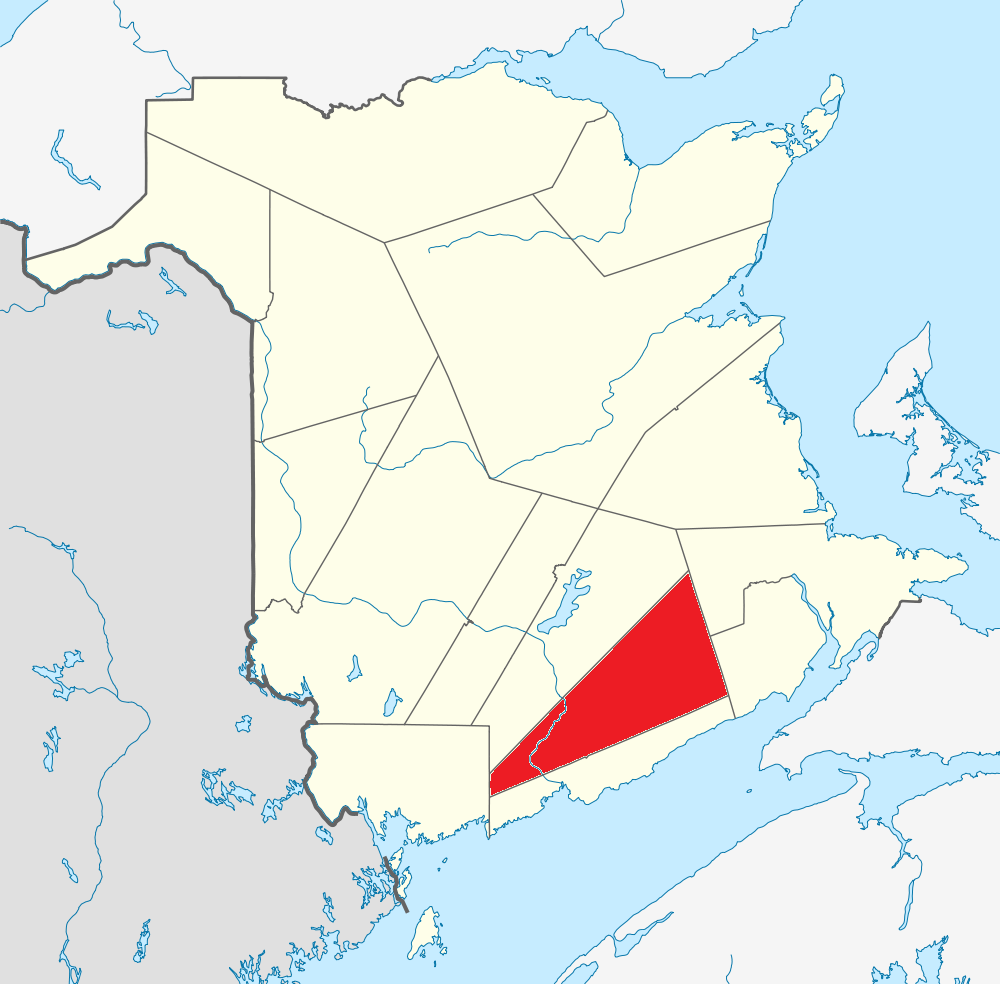
- Location within New Brunswick
- Country: Canada
- Province: New Brunswick
- Established: 1785
- Electoral Districts Federal: Fundy Royal / New Brunswick Southwest

Area
  - Land: 3,482.35 km^{2} (1,344.54 sq mi)

Population (2021)
  - Total: 71,184
  - Density: 20.4/km^{2} (53/sq mi)
  - Change 2016-2021: ▲3.3%
  - Dwellings: 30,283
- Time zone: UTC-4 (AST)
  - Summer (DST): UTC-3 (ADT)
- Area code: 506

Kings County is located in southern New Brunswick, Canada. Its historical shire town is Hampton, and it was named as an expression of loyalty to the British Crown. Both the Saint John and Kennebecasis Rivers pass through the county.

Approximately half of the population of 71,184 (as of 2021) lives in suburbs of the nearby city of Saint John.

== Census subdivisions ==
=== Communities ===
There are seven municipalities within Kings County (listed by 2016 population):

Official name	Designation	Area km^{2}	Population	Parish
Quispamsis	Town	57.21	18,245	Rothesay
Rothesay	Town	34.72	11,659	Rothesay
Grand Bay-Westfield	Town	59.78	4,964	Westfield
Hampton	Town	21.09	4,289	Hampton
Sussex	Town	8.95	4,282	Sussex
Sussex Corner	Village	9.34	1,461	Sussex
Norton	Village	75.35	1,382	Norton

=== Parishes ===
The county is subdivided into fifteen parishes (listed by 2016 population):

Official name	Area km^{2}	Population	Municipalities	Unincorporated communities
Studholm	449.37	3,522		Berwick / Carsonville / Centreville / Collina / Fox Hill / Gibbon / Gibbon Mountain / Head of Millstream / Jordan Mountain / Kierstead Mountain / Kings / Lower Millstream / Marrtown / McGregor Brook / Mount Hebron / Mount Middleton / Mount Pisgah / Newtown / Parleeville / Pearsonville / Pleasant Ridge / Plumweseep / Prescott Hill / Roachville / Sharps Hill / Smiths Creek / Snider Mountain / Studholm / Summerfield / Thompson Corner
Kingston	200.69	2,913		Bedford / Centreton / Chapel Grove / Clifton Royal / East Riverside-Kinghurst / Elmhurst / Erbs Cove / Grays Mills / Grey Mills / Kingston / Kingston Corner / Kingston Creek / Long Reach / Lower Kingston / Moss Glen / Perry Point / Renforth / Shampers / The Cedars / Waltons Lake / Whitehead / Whites Mills
Hampton	121.26	2,809	Hampton (town)	Bonney Road / Damascus / Darlings Island / French Village / Hampton / Lakeside / Mount Prospect / Nauwigewauk / Smithtown / Titusville
Sussex	244.02	2,516	Sussex (town); Sussex Corner (village)	Apohaqui / Campbell Settlement / Cassidy Lake / Drurys Cove / Dutch Valley / Erb Settlement / Hazel Hill / Jeffries Corner / Lisson Settlement / Lower Cove / Markhamville / McCain Settlement / Millbrook / New Line Road / Ratter Corner / Riverbank / Rockville / Southfield / Upper Wards Creek / Vinegar Hill / Wards Creek
Westfield	295.70	1,962	Grand Bay-Westfield (town)	Bayswater / Carters Point / Cheyne Settlement / Days Landing / Hardings Point / Keatings Corner / Lands End / Milkish / Morrisdale / Nerepis / Public Landing / Sand Point / Summerville / Woodmans Point
Springfield	248.54	1,525		Belleisle Creek / Bull Moose Hill / East Scotch Settlement / Elm Brook / Hatfield Point / Irish Settlement / Joliffs Brook / Keirsteadville / Long Point / Lower Midland / Midland / Northrups Corner / Pascobac / Searsville / Springfield / Stewarton / The Grant / Upper Belleisle / Upper Midland / West Scotch Settlement
Cardwell	311.90	1,353		Anagance / Buckley Settlement / Cardwell / Crockets Corner / Dunsinane / Five Points / Harper Settlement / Lindys / McCully / Mechanic Settlement / Penobsquis / Picadilly / Portage Vale / South Branch / Springdale / Upper Goshen
Norton	144.76	1,301	Norton (village)	Bloomfield / Central Norton / Guthrie Road / Ketchum Road / Passekeag / Woodpecker Hall
Upham	189.22	1,269		Barnesville / Bloomfield Ridge / Clover Hill / Hanford Brook / Salina / Salt Springs / Upham / Upper Salt Springs / Upperton
Havelock	349.23	1,061		Anagance Ridge / Canaan Road / Cornhill / Cornhill East / Cosman Settlement / Creek Road / Dubee Settlement / Havelock / Knightville / Lower Ridge / Mannhurst / Perry Settlement / Salem / Samp Hill / Springhill / Whites Mountain
Greenwich	114.46	1,058		Browns Corner / Browns Flat / Central Greenwich / Cochrane Corner / Days Corner / Evandale / Glenwood / Greenwich Hill / Johnson Croft / Lynch Corner / Oak Point / Upper Greenwich / Victoria Beach
Waterford	221.27	469		Cedar Camp / Chambers Settlement / Donegal / Parlee Brook / Urney / Walker Settlement / Waterford
Kars	75.84	325		Beulah / Earle Wharf / Kars / Lower Kars / Tennants Cove
Rothesay	7.26	325	Quispamsis (town); Rothesay (town)	Barsa / Bradley Lake / East Riverside-Kinghurst / Fairvale / Golden Grove / Hillhurst / Hunter Lake-Upper Hunter Lake Road / Kennebecasis Park / Renforth / Torryburn / Wells
Hammond	244.45	251		Devine Corner / Hammond / Hammondvale / Hilldale / Hillsdale / Londonderry / Poodiac

== Demographics ==
As a census division in the 2021 Census of Population conducted by Statistics Canada, Kings County had a population of 71,184 living in 28,464 of its 30,283 total private dwellings, a change of 3.3% from its 2016 population of 68,941. With a land area of 3,482.35 km^{2} (1,344.54 sq mi), it had a population density of 20.4/km^{2} (52.9/sq mi) in 2021.

Population trend

Census	Population	Change (%)
2021	71,184	▲3.3%
2016	68,941	▼1.0%
2011	69,665	▲5.8%
2006	65,824	▲2.5%
2001	64,208	▼0.8%
1996	64,724	▲4.2%
1991	62,122	N/A

Mother tongue (2016)

Language	Population	Pct (%)
English only	64,355	93.4%
French only	2,300	3.3%
Other languages	2,005	2.9%
Both English and French	280	0.4%

== Notable people ==
Although not everyone in this list was born in Kings County, they all live or have lived in Kings County and have had significant connections to the communities.

Name	Community	Famous for	Birth	Death	Other
Winston Bronnum	Sussex	Sculptor	1929	1991	
Chris Cummings	Norton	Country music singer	1975		
John Peters Humphrey	Hampton	Lawyer	1905	1995	diplomat, scholar and principal author of the Universal Declaration of Human Rights
Anna Ruth Lang	Nauwigewauk	Recipient of the Canadian Cross of Valour (1982)			
Hugh J. McCormick	Kennebecasis Island	Speed Skater	1854	1910	World professional speed skater 1890-1892
George McCready Price	Havelock	Creationist	1870	1963	
Anna McNulty	Grand Bay-Westfield	YouTuber	2002		

== See also ==
- List of communities in New Brunswick
- Royal eponyms in Canada
