= Kingston Parish, New Brunswick =

Coordinates: 45.50358°N 65.992813°W

Kingston
- Parish
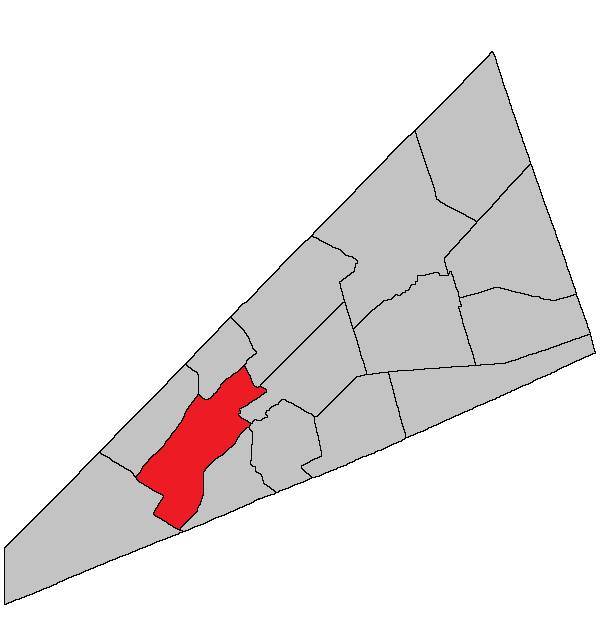
- Location within Kings County, New Brunswick.
- Country: Canada
- Province: New Brunswick
- County: Kings County
- Erected: 1786

Area
  - Land: 200.41 km^{2} (77.38 sq mi)

Population (2021)
  - Total: 3,202
  - Density: 16/km^{2} (41/sq mi)
  - Change 2016-2021: ▲9.9%
  - Dwellings: 1,631
- Time zone: UTC-4 (AST)
  - Summer (DST): UTC-3 (ADT)

Kingston is a geographic parish in Kings County, New Brunswick, Canada.

Prior to the 2023 governance reform, it formed the local service district of the parish of Kingston, which was a member of the Fundy Regional Service Commission (FRSC).

== Origin of name ==
The parish's name may have been chosen as a symbol of loyalty to the Crown but was also a common name in the Thirteen Colonies.

Notable is that the names of Kings County's pre-1800 parishes all occur in both New Jersey and North Carolina.

== History ==
Kingston was erected in 1786 as one of the original parishes of Kings County. It included Greenwich Parish and parts of Hampton, Kars, and Norton Parishes but part of the modern parish along the Kennebecasis River was in Westfield Parish.

In 1795 Kings County's parishes were reorganised, erecting Hampton and Norton.

In 1844 the boundary with Norton was altered.

== Boundaries ==
Kingston Parish is bounded:

- on the northwest by the Long Reach of the Saint John River and Belleisle Bay;
- on the east by a line beginning on the shore of Belleisle Bay at the end of the western line of the William Roden grant, nearly due north of the junction of Route 845 and Kiersteadville Road, (Note: Although the community is spelt Keirsteadville, the road is spelt Kiersteadville.) then running south-southwesterly along the grant line to the rear of the grant, then southwesterly about 300 metres along the northern line of the Jeremiah Maybe grant to its northwestern corner, then southeasterly along its western line for about 1.2 kilometres, then turning left 90º and running northeasterly parallel to the rear line of the Belleisle Bay shore grants until it strikes Rogers Road, then southeasterly along the prolongation of the eastern line of the John & Peter Cable grant on the Kennebecasis River until it strikes the rear of the Cable grant, about 1.3 kilometres northeast of Route 845 and near the northern bank of Pickwauket Brook, then west-southwesterly along the rear of the Kennebecasis River grants, including a dogleg toward the river, until it reaches the northwestern corner of the Freedom Burdock grant, about 150 metres past the Ketchum Road, then southeasterly along the western line of the Burdock grant to the Kennebecasis River;
- on the southeast by the Kennebecasis River;
- on the southwest by the southwestern line of the Stephen Baxter grant on Milkish Creek, prolonged southeasterly to the Saint John County line in the Kennebecasis, then northwesterly about 2.7 kilometres along the Baxter grant until it strikes the prolongation of the main tier of grants on the Kennebecasis, then northeasterly along the rear of the tier until it strikes the prolongation of the line between two grants to Robert and Caleb Merrit on the Long Reach, then northwesterly along the prolongation and the grant line to the Long Reach;
- including Long Island and Mather Island in the Kennebecasis.

== Governance ==
Before 2023, the entire parish formed the local service district of the parish of Kingston, established in 1968 to assess for fire protection. Non-fire related rescue was added in 2015. First aid and ambulance services (1976–2015) was formerly included.

== Communities ==
Communities at least partly within the parish.

- Bedford
- Centreton
- Chapel Grove
- Clifton Royal
- Elmhurst
- Erbs Cove
- Grays Mills
- Holderville
- Kingston
- Kingston Corner
- Long Reach
- Lower Kingston
- Moss Glen
- Perry Point
- Reeds Point
- Shampers
- The Cedars
- Waltons Lake
- Whitehead
- Whites Bluff
- Whites Mills

== Bodies of water ==
Bodies of water (Note: Not including brooks, ponds or coves.) at least partly in the parish.

- Kennebecasis River
  - North Channel
- Saint John River
- Gorhams Creek
- Kingston Creek
- Salmon Creek
- Belleisle Bay
- at least twenty officially named lakes

== Islands ==
Islands at least partly in the parish.

- Long Island
- Mather Island

== Demographics ==
=== Population ===
Population trend

Census	Population	Change (%)
2016	2,913	▼1.3%
2011	2,952	▲2.2%
2006	2,888	▼2.5%
2001	2,817	▲0.0%
1996		▼0.0%
1991		N/A

=== Language ===
Mother tongue (2016)

Language	Population	Pct (%)
French only	70	2.4%
English only	2,785	96.2%
Both English and French	0	0%
Other languages	40	1.4%

== Access Routes ==
Highways and numbered routes that run through the parish, including external routes that start or finish at the parish limits:

- Highways
  - None
- Principal Routes
  - None
- Secondary Routes:
  - Route 845
  - Route 850
- External Routes:
  - None

== See also ==
- List of parishes in New Brunswick
