= Department of Transportation and Infrastructure (New Brunswick) =

Government agency in New Brunswick, Canada

Agency overview
- Formed: 2012
- Jurisdiction: New Brunswick, Canada
- Minister responsible: Chuck Chiasson, Transportation and Infrastructure
- Deputy Minister responsible: Kelly Cain, Transportation and Infrastructure
- Parent department: Government of New Brunswick

The Department of Transportation and Infrastructure is a part of the Government of New Brunswick. It is charged with maintenance of government facilities and the province's highway network. From 1855 to 1912, it was known as the Board of Public Works. From 1912 to 1967, it was known as Department of Public Works and Highways. In 1967, its functions were divided between the Department of Public Works and the Department of Transportation. In 2012, the Department of Transportation and the infrastructure management components of the Department of Supply and Services (the successor to the Department of Public Works) were merged back together.

To see the ministers : Minister of the Department of Transportation and Infrastructure (New Brunswick)

== Ferries ==
As part of its duties in maintaining the provincial highway network, the Department of Transportation is responsible for the operation of a number of ferry services. The majority are free of tolls.

Saint John River and tributaries

- Belleisle Bay Ferry, across Belleisle Bay
- Evandale Ferry, across the Saint John River
- Gagetown Ferry, across the Saint John River
- Gondola Point Ferry, across the Kennebecasis River
- Hampstead Ferry, across the Saint John River
- Kennebecasis Island Ferry, across the Kennebecasis River
- Summerville to Millidgeville Ferry, across the Kennebecasis River
- Westfield Ferry, across the Saint John River

Deer Island

- Letete to Deer Island Ferry, across Passamaquoddy Bay

Grand Manan Island and White Head Island

These services are operated by Coastal Transport Limited. Passengers and vehicles must pay fares when leaving Grand Manan for the mainland.

- Blacks Harbour to Grand Manan Island Ferry
- Grand Manan Island to White Head Island Ferry

== Roads ==
The department is responsible for building and maintaining all public roads in areas of provincial jurisdiction. Additionally, some numbered public roads that pass through municipalities are also built and maintained by the department.

Arterial highways

In 1997 the department changed the way that it finances and builds arterial highways by utilizing what is known as a "design-build-operate" tendering process. This began with the Moncton-Longs Creek section of Route 2 which started as a toll highway but was changed to a hidden toll arrangement whereby the provincial government pays the charges for vehicle usage and the company that built the highway operates and maintains the road for a period of 25 years after it opened in 2002. The design-build-operate model was used again for the Longs Creek-Edmundston section of Route 2, as well as for the entirety of Route 95, which opened in 2008 and will be operated and maintained for a period of 25 years by the builder. A third design-build-operate project has been undertaken for Route 1.

New Brunswick Highway Corporation

Certain arterial highways in the province are owned and operated by the New Brunswick Highway Corporation, a provincial Crown corporation that was established to do the following:

- to acquire, hold, own, use, lease, license, sell, plan, design, finance, refinance, develop, construct, improve, operate, manage, maintain, repair, replace, alter, extend, expand, rehabilitate, dispose of or otherwise deal with
  - highways, the administration and control of which are given to the Corporation by the Minister of Transportation with the approval of the Lieutenant-Governor in Council, and
  - systems of toll collection in relation to such highways

== See also ==
- Geography of New Brunswick
