= New Brunswick Route 845 =

Highway in New Brunswick

Route 845

Route information
- Maintained by New Brunswick Department of Transportation
- Length: 84.0 km (52.2 mi)

Major junctions
- West end: Route 850 in Kingston
- East end: Route 121 in Hampton

Location
- Country: Canada
- Province: New Brunswick
- Counties: Kings

Highway system
- Provincial highways in New Brunswick; Former routes
← Route 825	→ Route 850

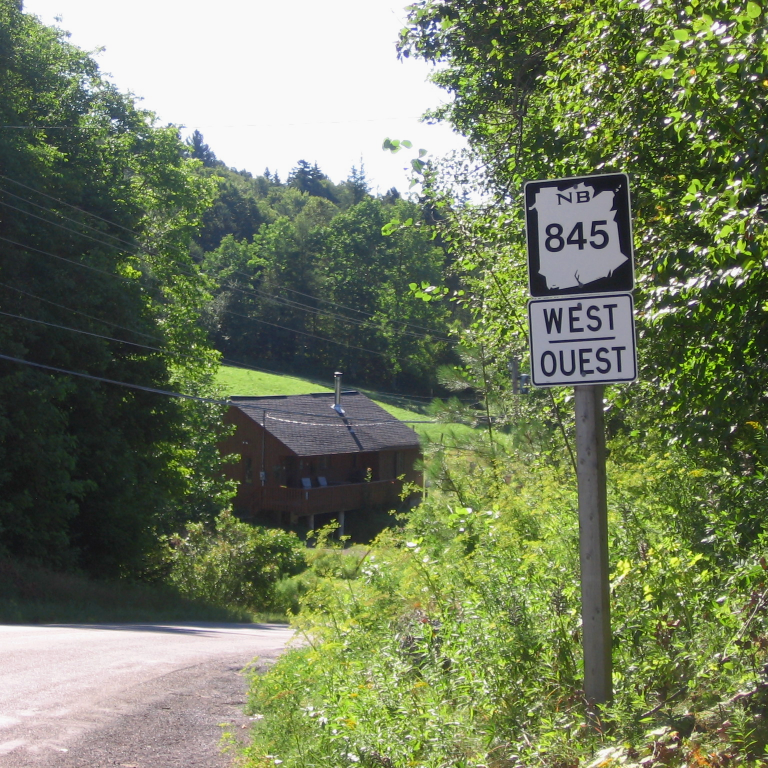
Route sign in Kingston, New Brunswick.

Route 845 is a Canadian highway in Kings County, New Brunswick.

The road passes along the southern side of the Kingston Peninsula.

Route 845 begins within the town limits of Hampton at an intersection with Route 121. Next comes the village of Kingston, followed by the village of Clifton Royal which has a cable ferry (Gondola Point Ferry) to the Saint John suburb of Quispamsis. Route 845 follows the southern shore of the Kingston Peninsula along the Kennebecasis River past Clifton Royal and Chapel Grove. Next is the community of Summerville, which has a seasonal ferry to Millidgeville, in Saint John. Adjacent to this ferry is another cable ferry to Kennebecasis Island, a summer-only community accessible from May to November. The road curves northward at Lands End opposite Grand Bay-Westfield, where a third ferry to Grand Bay-Westfield leaves from the Hardings Point Landing Road.

The second half of Route 845 runs northeasterly along the Saint John River from Hardings Point back to Kingston. Just before the end of the highway at Kingston Corner, there is a turnoff to Route 850. Route 845 terminates at Kingston Corner where it meets itself, basically forming one huge rectangular loop.

== See also ==
- List of New Brunswick provincial highways
