= New Brunswick Route 119 =

Highway in New Brunswick, Canada

Route 119

Route information
- Maintained by New Brunswick Department of Transportation
- Length: 5.67 km (3.52 mi)
- Existed: 1986–present

Major junctions
- North end: Route 1 in Quispamsis
- Route 100 in Quispamsis
- South end: Route 845 / Gondola Point Ferry over Kennebecasis River in Reeds Point

Location
- Country: Canada
- Province: New Brunswick
- Major cities: Quispamsis

Highway system
- Provincial highways in New Brunswick; Former routes
← Route 118	→ Route 120

Route 119 is a limited-access North/South provincial highway in the Canadian province of New Brunswick. The road runs from Route 1 (The Mackay Highway) to the Gondola Point Ferry. The road has a length of approximately 6 kilometres, and only services Quispamsis. The road is also called Gondola Point Arterial.

== History ==
The Gondola Point Arterial was constructed in 1986.

== Intersecting routes ==
- Route 100 in Quispamsis

== River crossings ==
- None

== Communities along the Route ==
- Quispamsis

== See also ==
- List of New Brunswick provincial highways
