= Chapel Grove, New Brunswick =

Coordinates: 45.383333°N 66.080556°W

Location of Chapel Grove in New Brunswick

Chapel Grove is a Canadian rural community in Kings County, New Brunswick.

It is adjacent to Summerville and lies south of Clifton Royal on the Kingston Peninsula on the northwest bank of the Kennebecasis River opposite the towns of Quispamsis and Rothesay. The community is served by New Brunswick Route 845. The community is framed by steep hills directly west of Long Island.

Among Chapel Grove's earliest European settlers were United Empire Loyalists who were granted farmsteads in the area for their loyalty to the British cause. Most of these farms are now overgrown by dense forest. The rural site developed in the early twentieth century as a summer retreat for residents of Saint John, New Brunswick. The community derives its name from St Bridget's Catholic Church, situated in a grove of cedar trees.

St. Bridget's mission church built between 1872 and 1873 was served by the Redemptorist order of priests from St. Peter's parish in Saint John from 1887 to 2006, and is now served by the Roman Catholic Diocese of Saint John, New Brunswick. Prior to the erection of the present church, a structure known as Etchingham's Chapel occupied the site.

== See also ==
- List of communities in New Brunswick
- List of people from Kings County, New Brunswick
