= Kennebecasis Island =

Island in New Brunswick, Canada

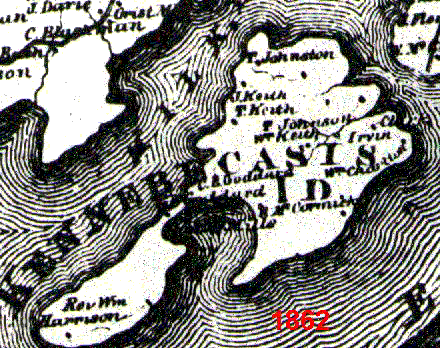
- Kennebecasis Island from an 1862 map

- Location within New Brunswick
- Interactive map of Kennebecasis Island

Geography
- Location: Kennebecasis River
- Coordinates: 45°19′40″N 66°07′50″W

Administration
- Canada
- Province: New Brunswick
- County: King's County
- Parish: Westfield Parish

Kennebecasis Island (also called McCormick's Island) is a small Canadian island located in the Province of New Brunswick at the confluence of the Saint John River and Kennebecasis River.

Its proximity to the city of Saint John has resulted in a seasonal community of about 100 cottages, as well as a 3-hole golf course and tennis court being established. During the late 1990s a cottage subdivision called "Island Estates" was established on the island, which saw a new boat launch, the present golf course and numerous new cottages established. When "Island Estates" was established electricity became available in several areas of the island, with potential for future expansion. The island's perimeter contains many secluded beaches, rocky outcrops and has natural deep-water coves which provide excellent shelter for boaters needing safe harbour to lay in overnight.

Originally Kennebecasis Island supported five farms: Hutchings, Morrow, Keith and two McCormick. There was also a one-room schoolhouse, a post office, a commercial river-boat landing and a small hotel where, during the early 1900s, visitors wanting a reprieve from the heavy industrial environment in Saint John would stay on weekends. Today most of the original building stock and infrastructure is gone with the exception of McCormick House, which is the only farm remaining with its original land allotment still intact.

The most famous Kennebecasis Islander was Hugh J. McCormick, a professional speed skater from 1883 until 1895. In 1890 Hugh McCormick won the World Professional Speed Skating Champion title by beating reigning world champion Axel Paulson of Norway in a three-race meet held at Minneapolis, Minnesota.

Visitors travel to the island using the Kennebecasis Island Ferry, operated by the New Brunswick Department of Transportation during the non-ice months from May to mid-November. The ferry departs from Summerville on the Kingston Peninsula. After November, the only way to reach it is by driving or walking across the ice. During the spring melt, high waters often pinch the island into two separate entities near its thinnest point.

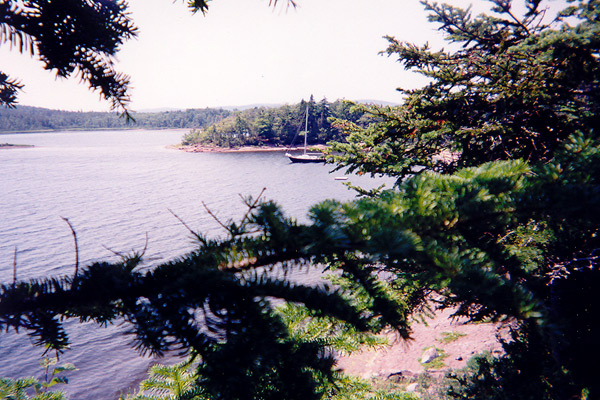
A view of a sailboat in the north cove of Kennebecasis Island

The north and east of the island is bordered by Milkish Channel, which separates the island from the Kingston Peninsula. An inlet called McCormack's Cove juts into the island's south side from Grand Bay, the meeting point of the St. John and Kennebecasis rivers. The island is a short distance (approximately one hour driving) from the city of Saint John.

The island also hosts a wide range of wildlife including deer and raccoon, as even some moose have been spotted.

== See also ==
- List of communities in New Brunswick
- List of islands of New Brunswick
- Kennebecasis River
- Kingston Peninsula
