= Kathinka Paulsen White =

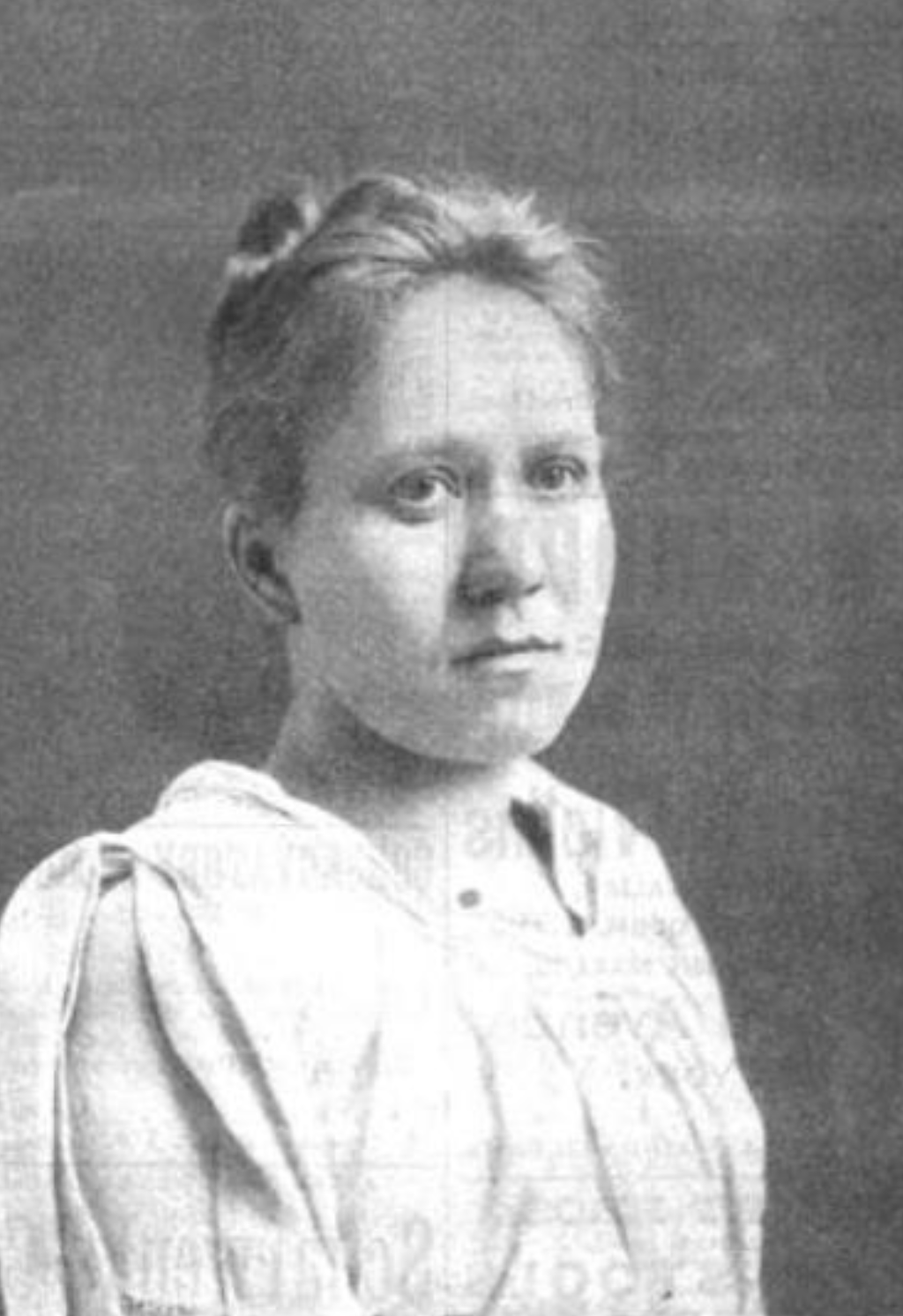
Kathinka Paulsen White as depicted on the front cover of The Musical Courier on September 2, 1891.

Kathinka Paulsen White (18 November 1859 – 15 February 1960) was a Norwegian born American soprano. A native of Oslo, she was educated as a musician in Berlin and Paris and began her singing career in Germany. She married the American artist Allan T. White while studying in Paris, and subsequently moved to the United States where she had a career as a concert soprano centered largely in Boston. She was highly active as a concert singer in the early 1890s; performing as a soloist with the Boston Symphony Orchestra and at Worcester Music Festival among other organizations. Afterwords she performed only sporadically as she devoted herself to raising a family.

== Life and career ==
The daughter of Johan Peter Paulsen and his wife Haagine Olsen, Kathinka Paulsen was born in Oslo (then Christiania), Norway on 18 November 1859. She was the sister of composer Alfred Paulsen, and skater Axel Paulsen. She was educated in Berlin at the Kullak Conservatory (KC, later known as the Stern Conservatory) where she studied both instrumental and vocal music for five years. She was a piano student of Theodor Kullak who led the KC. She made her debut as a vocalist in Berlin.

After completing her studies at KC, Kathinka went to Paris where studied singing with Pauline Viardot for two years. In Paris she formed a romantic attachment to the American artist Allan T. White whom she married. They relocated to the United States soon after. She made her American debut at an opera festival held at Boston Music Hall (BMH) in February 1891; performing excerpts from operas with Bernhard Listemann conducting. She performed the jewel song from Faust under the baton of George Whitefield Chadwick at a music festival on Springfield, Massachusetts in May 1891. In the summer of 1891 she was a soloist at the Minneapolis Sangerfest for performances at the Coliseum building on the campus of the University of Minnesota. The following November she was a soloist at the Worcester Music Festival performing excerpts from the opera Le Cid.

In January 1892 Paulsen White appeared in recital with contralto Aagot Lunde at Boston's Union Hall, and performed as a soloist in a concert oratorio excerpts conducted by Carl Zerrahn at the BMH. In February 1892 she was the soprano soloist in Ludwig van Beethoven's Mass in C major in a concert at Mechanics Hall featuring the combined choirs of all of the Roman Catholic churches in Boston. Later that year she performed in concerts in Boston as a member of the William Ludwig Concert Company, and in concerts with conductor Bernhard Listemann and the orchestra of the Boston Philharmonic Club. She also gave a recital in Portland, Maine in 1892 under the auspices of the Rossini Club, In 1893 she was a soloist with the Boston Symphony Orchestra; singing excerpts from the title role in Jules Massenet's Hérodiade.

Paulsen White's singing appearances became more sporadic as she devoted her time to raising a family in Worcester County, Massachusetts. She had three children with husband: Eilif, Hilma, and Ragnhild. In 1901 she was a soloist in William Harvey Pélissier's cantata The Wreck of the Hesperus in Fitchburg, Massachusetts, and was the soprano soloist in Joseph Haydn's The Creation under conductor Franz Albert Ballaseyus at the Hawaiian Opera House in Honolulu. In 1912 she was part of a group of Americans who participated in the opening ceremony dedicating Rebild National Park in Denmark. In 1916 she was a soloist at Normanna Hall in Minneapolis for the national concert of the United Scandinavian Singers of America.

Paulsen White died in Winchendon, Massachusetts on 15 February 1960 at the age of 100.
