= Minister's Face Nature Preserve =

Coordinates: 45°24′08″N 66°01′40″W

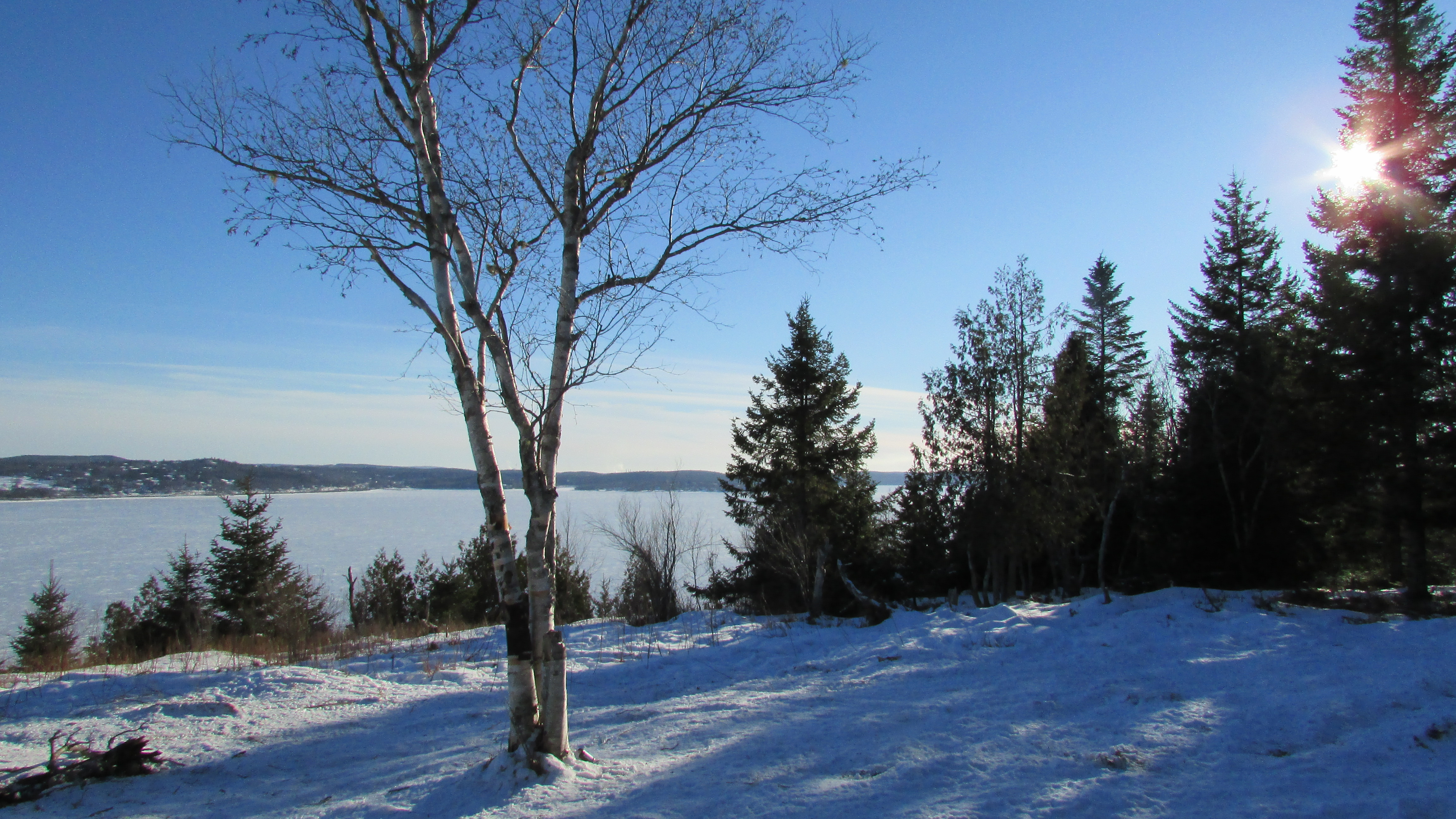
Minister's Face, Long Island (2019)

Minister's Face Nature Preserve is a Canadian nature preserve on Long Island in New Brunswick's Kennebecasis River, northwest of the town of Rothesay.

Minister's Face is home to several endangered species of plants, as well as a nesting site for peregrine falcons.
