= Kennebecasis Island Ferry =

Coordinates: 45.332207°N 66.112247°W

The Kennebecasis Island Ferry is a ferry crossing the Kennebecasis River in the Canadian province of New Brunswick. The ferry links Summerville on the Kingston Peninsula with Kennebecasis Island.

The crossing is 0.5 kilometres (0.31 mi) in length, takes 5 minutes, and is free of tolls. The single ferry carries up to 12 cars at a time, and operates during the ice-free period, generally from May to November. The service runs from 0700 until 1900 or later, depending on the day and time of year. It is operated by the New Brunswick Department of Transportation, and in summer provides the only road access to the island. In winter the island can only be reached by travelling across the ice.
