= Summerville to Millidgeville Ferry =

Coordinates: 45.037869°N 66.914635°W

The Summerville to Millidgeville Ferry is a ferry in the Canadian province of New Brunswick. The ferry crosses the Kennebecasis River, linking Millidgeville on the southern bank, to Summerville on the Kingston Peninsula. It is currently served by the ferry Peninsula Princess.

The crossing is 1.9 kilometres (1.2 mi) in length, takes 15 minutes, and is free of tolls. The single ferry provides service on the route, carrying up to 24 cars at a time. Service is provided from Spring until Fall depending on river conditions, with ferries operating at least hourly between 0800 and 2300, and half-hourly or more frequently for most of the day. The service is operated by the New Brunswick Department of Transportation.

The Peninsula Princess is a propeller driven ferry with a car capacity of 24, and a passenger capacity of 99. First registered in 1994, she is 38.25 metres (125.5 ft) in length, 11.61 metres (38.1 ft) in breadth and 2.43 metres (8 ft 0 in) in depth. She has a gross tonnage of 313 and a net tonnage of 203.
