= LA Knight =

American professional wrestler (born 1982)

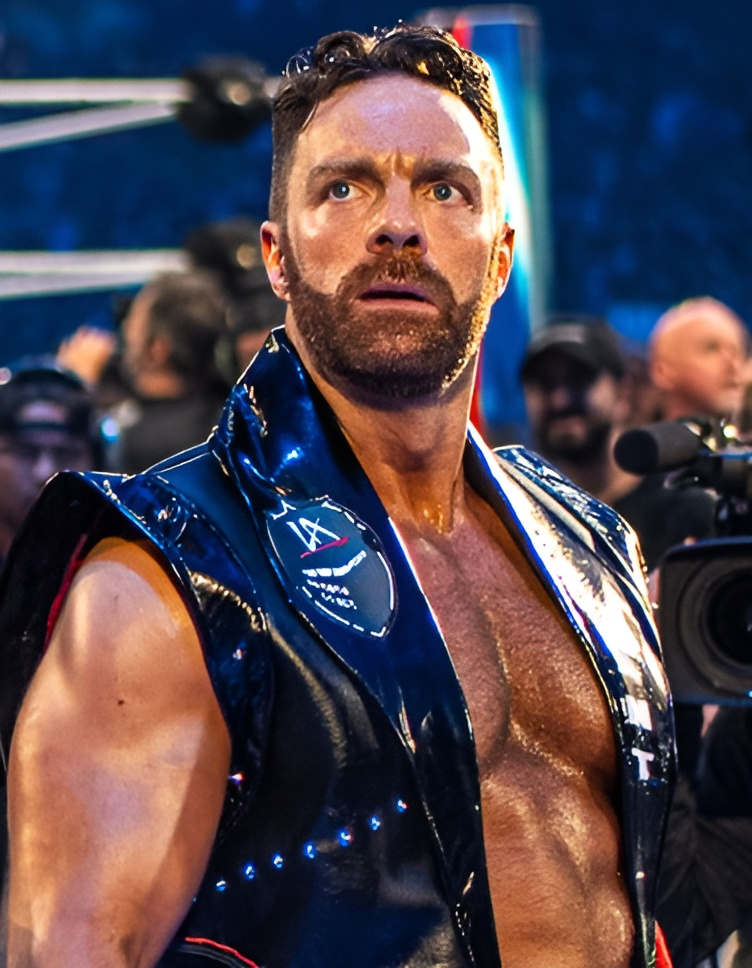
- Knight in 2024

Personal information
- Born: Shaun Edward Ricker; November 1, 1982 (age 44) Hagerstown, Maryland, U.S.

Professional wrestling career
- Ring name(s): Deuce; Dick Rick; Dick Rick Leykis; El Hijo de Trump; Eli Drake; LA Knight; Max Dupri; Shaun Ricker; Slate Randall
- Billed height: 6 ft 1 in (185 cm)
- Billed weight: 240 lb (109 kg)
- Billed from: Baltimore, Maryland; Hagerstown, Maryland; Los Angeles, California
- Trained by: Cody Hawk
- Debut: February 15, 2003

Shaun Edward Ricker (born November 1, 1982) is an American professional wrestler. He is signed to WWE, where he performs on the Raw brand under the ring name LA Knight.

Ricker began his professional wrestling career on the independent circuit in 2003 and joined the NWA-affiliated CWFH in 2010. He signed with WWE in 2013 and performed as an enhancement talent under the ring names Slate Randall until being released in 2014. After adopting the ring name Eli Drake, Ricker signed with TNA in 2015 and became a one-time TNA World Champion, one-time TNA King of the Mountain Champion, one-time TNA World Tag Team Champion (with Scott Steiner), and a two-time Feast or Fired winner.

Ricker rejoined NWA in 2019 and won the NWA World Tag Team Championship (with James Storm) once. He re-signed with WWE in 2021 under the ring name LA Knight, and became a one-time Million Dollar Champion. He was repackaged as Max Dupri, the manager of Maximum Male Models, in 2022; upon reverting to the LA Knight character a few months later, he began gaining popularity and has since become a two-time WWE United States Champion.

Outside of wrestling, Ricker appeared on the reality television series The Hero and the comedy series Brooklyn Nine-Nine. He provided motion capture for other WWE wrestlers for the WWE 2K video game series and voiced a fictional character in WWE 2K22.

== Early life ==
Shaun Edward Ricker was born in Hagerstown, Maryland, on November 1, 1982. He has two older siblings and started watching professional wrestling at the age of three. He graduated from North Hagerstown High School, where he played in the school's band and participated in track and field.

== Professional wrestling career ==
=== Early career (2003–2010) ===
Ricker moved to Cincinnati, Ohio and began training at the age of 20 on March 17, 2003, supporting himself with work at a lumber mill and a Ruby Tuesday restaurant. He began working regularly for the Heartland Wrestling Association (HWA) later that year under the ring name Deuce. On November 9, 2004, Deuce won the HWA Television Championship, and dropped it on January 4, 2005.

=== National Wrestling Alliance (2009–2012) ===
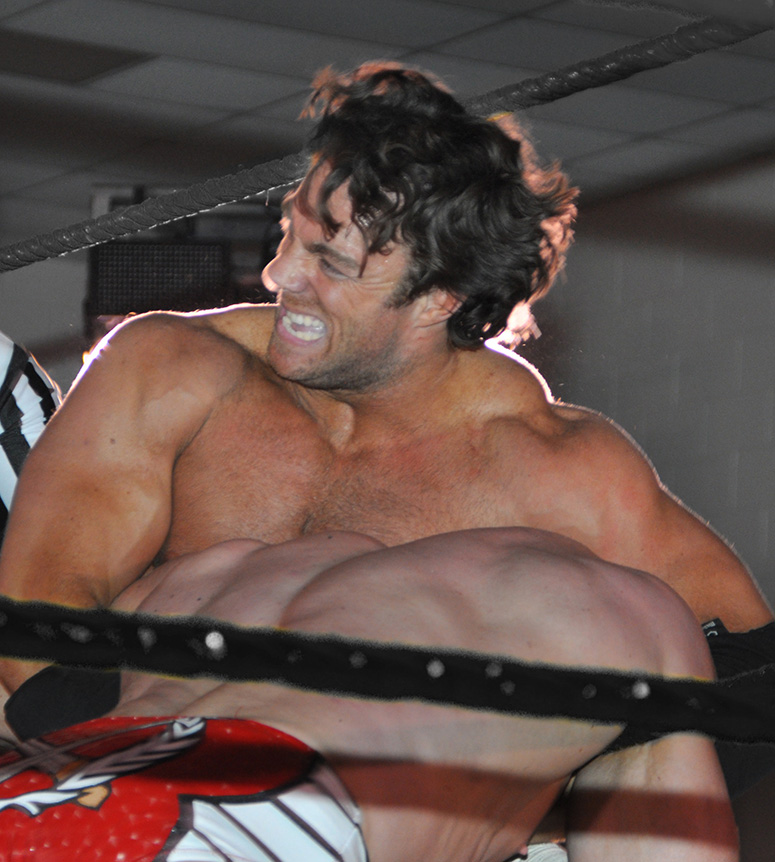
Ricker wrestling as Slate Randall in February 2014

==== NWA Championship Wrestling from Hollywood (2010–2013) ====
In December 2010, Ricker moved to work for NWA Championship Wrestling from Hollywood. He joined forces with Brian Cage, forming The Natural Selection tag team and winning the NWA Heritage Tag Team Championship from The RockNES Monsters on December 8. After holding the titles for over 200 days, The Natural Selection lost them to The Tribe when Cage missed the event, causing the match to become a handicap match. Ricker then feuded with Cage for several months, staying even on victories until he defeated Cage to end their feud in late 2012.

On December 24, Ricker unsuccessfully challenged Adam Pearce for the NWA Worlds Heavyweight Championship. However, he won the Percy Pringle III Cup, where the winner earned a shot at any championship at any time and place. On May 5, 2013, Ricker won the 30-Man Red Carpet Rumble for the CWFH Heritage Heavyweight Championship in homage to his late friend and manager Percy Pringle. That same night, he successfully defended the title against Ryan Taylor.

Ricker would lose the championship to Scorpio Sky in a Loser Leaves Hollywood match later that night; this match was scheduled to air on June 2, on tape delay, but was never aired due to the controversial finish. After the cameras went off, Ricker got on the microphone and thanked all of the fans for coming out, saying it would be the last time he would be seen in a ring for Championship Wrestling from Hollywood. All of the wrestlers came out from the back and gave Ricker a standing ovation. However, he made one more final television appearance, defeating Sky's fellow Experience members Big Duke and Xtian Cole.

=== WWE (2013–2014) ===
In May 2013, it was reported that Ricker and other independent wrestlers were undergoing the medical tests required to be signed by WWE before reporting to the WWE Performance Center. He had previously performed sporadically in WWE over the years, starting with an appearance under the name Dick Rick, where he teamed with Jon Moxley in a losing effort against Big Show in a dark handicap match in May 2006. He later teamed with Gene Snitsky in a losing effort against Cryme Tyme (JTG and Shad Gaspard) on ECW in 2008 and played a security guard during a segment featuring CM Punk and Kevin Nash on Raw in August 2011.

Upon signing with WWE, Ricker was given the ring name Slate Randall and made his debut by defeating Yoshi Tatsu in a dark match during an October 2013 taping of NXT. Following that victory, he competed as a jobber for NXT, losing to names such as Baron Corbin, Mojo Rawley, and Mason Ryan. He was released from his WWE contract on August 1, 2014.

=== Return to the independent circuit (2014–2019) ===
After his release from WWE, Ricker returned to wrestling on the independent circuit and began competing under the ring name Eli Drake. On September 5, at Full Impact Pro's Fallout, he participated in a trios tournament along with Mason Ryan and Michael Tarver, but they were defeated by the Full Impact Puerto Ricans (Lince Dorado, Jay Cruz, and Jay Rios) in the semifinals. On November 21, Ricker defeated Kenny King at FSW Luck of the Draw.

On May 11, 2019, Drake lost a fatal four-way match at a Maverick Pro Wrestling event. He made his debut for World Wrestling Council in Puerto Rico at WWC Aniversario on August 17, wrestling Carlito Colon.

=== Total Nonstop Action Wrestling / Impact Wrestling (2015–2019) ===
==== The Rising (2015–2016) ====
On February 16, 2015, Drake participated in TNA One Night Only's TNA Gut Check tournament, defeating Crazzy Steve to qualify for a five-way elimination match won by Tevita Fifita. On the March 27 episode of Impact Wrestling, he joined Drew Galloway and Micah to form The Rising, defeating The Beat Down Clan in his debut. On the July 1 episode of Impact Wrestling, The Beat Down Clan defeated The Rising in a 4-on-3 handicap match, forcing The Rising to dissolve.

On the July 15 episode of Impact Wrestling, Drake turned heel when he cost Galloway a match against TNA World Heavyweight Champion Ethan Carter III. Drake defeated Galloway at No Surrender on August 5 but lost a No Disqualification rematch on August 19 at Turning Point. At Bound for Glory on October 4, Drake competed in the Bound For Gold Gauntlet, which was won by Tyrus. He then participated in the TNA World Title Series as a member of group Future 4, along with Jessie Godderz, Micah and Crimson, advancing in the round of 16 along with Godderz, where he lost in the round of 16 to Mahabali Shera, being eliminated from the tournament. At TNA One Night Only: Live! on January 8, 2016, Drake and Godderz competed in a 3-Way TNA World Tag Team Championship match, which The Wolves won.

On January 26, 2016, Drake won the Feast or Fired match and the briefcase that contained a title shot for the future TNA King Of The Mountain Championship. On the February 9 episode of Impact Wrestling, Drake was attacked by Grado, who had been fired after his Feast or Fired briefcase contained the pink slip. Later that night, Drake interrupted him backstage, telling him "he better shut up about whatever he thinks he knows" and attacked Grado again, having him escorted out of the building through the tunnel. On the following episode of Impact Wrestling, Drake lost to Grado, who was masked as Odarg the Great. On the March 15 episode of Impact Wrestling, he faced Grado in a ladder match with Grado's career on the line, but was defeated.

==== Fact of Life and Namer of Dummies (2016–2017) ====
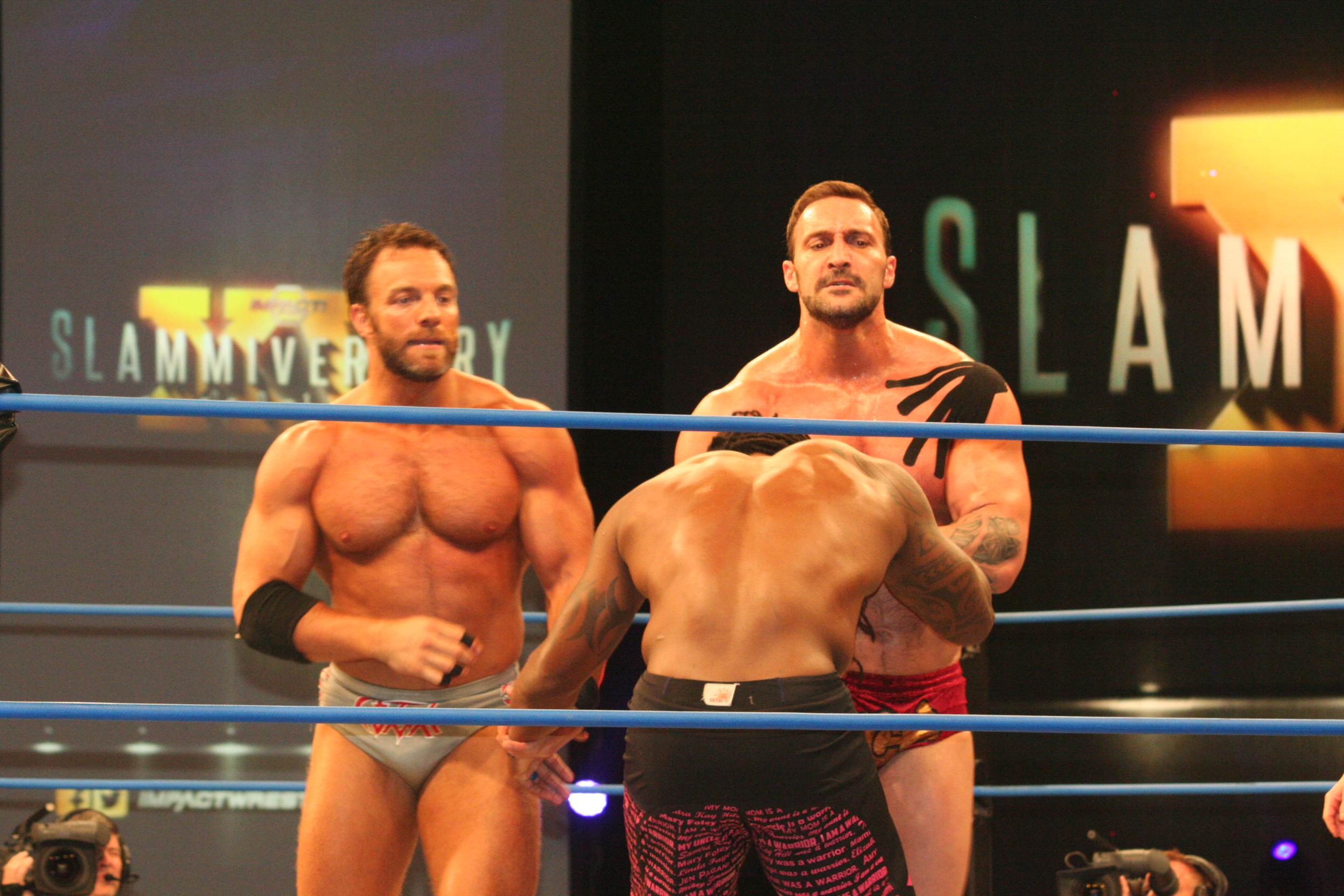
Drake (left) formed an alliance with Chris Adonis in 2017

On the May 31 episode of Impact on Pop, Drake cashed in his Feast or Fired briefcase for his shot at the TNA King of the Mountain Championship, defeating Bram, who was just viciously attacked by Lashley, winning his first title in TNA. He successfully defended the title against Bram on June 12 at Slammiversary. On the June 28 episode of Impact Wrestling, Drake hosted a Fact of Life segment, inviting James Storm as his guest and insulting him; Storm eventually hit Drake with the Last Call, igniting a feud between the two. On the July 5 episode of Impact Wrestling, Drake defended the King of the Mountain Championship against Storm, but intentionally disqualified himself to save the title. On the August 4 episode of Impact Wrestling, Drake lost the championship to Storm. He entered the Impact Grand Championship tournament, defeating Godderz in the first round but lost to Aron Rex in the semi-finals.

At Bound for Glory on October 2, Drake won the Bound for Gold Gauntlet by last eliminating Tyrus. After this, Drake started a feud against Ethan Carter III. On the November 10 episode of Impact Wrestling, Drake cashed in his Bound for Gold opportunity, but failed to win the TNA World Heavyweight Championship from Eddie Edwards. On the November 24 episode of Impact Wrestling, Drake faced EC3 in a title shot vs. voice match where if Ethan lost, he would lose his heavyweight title shot, and if Drake lost, he would not be able to talk for the rest of 2016; EC3 won by submission.

At One Night Only: Live! on January 6, 2017, Drake and Tyrus unsuccessfully challenged The Broken Hardys for the TNA World Tag Team Championship. Tyrus helped Drake take the red case during the Race for the Case on the January 19 episode of Impact Wrestling. On the February 2 episode of Impact Wrestling, Drake cashed in his Race for the Case briefcase for a match against Ethan Carter III, but lost. After the match, he and Tyrus attacked EC3, but were assaulted by the Death Crew Council. On the following episode of Impact Wrestling, Drake abandoned Tyrus during their handicap match against The Death Crew Council, causing them to lose. A match was scheduled between Drake and Tyrus two weeks later, which ended in a disqualification victory for Tyrus. After the match, Drake proposed more money to Tyrus for keeping him as a bodyguard, which Tyrus accepted.

On the May 11 episode of Impact Wrestling, with help from Tyrus and Chris Adonis, he attacked Impact Grand Champion Moose after his match against Marshe Rockett. On the June 1 episode of Impact Wrestling, Drake failed to win the Impact Grand Championship from Moose. At Slammiversary on July 2, Drake and Adonis lost to Moose and DeAngelo Williams.

==== Impact Global Champion (2017–2018) ====
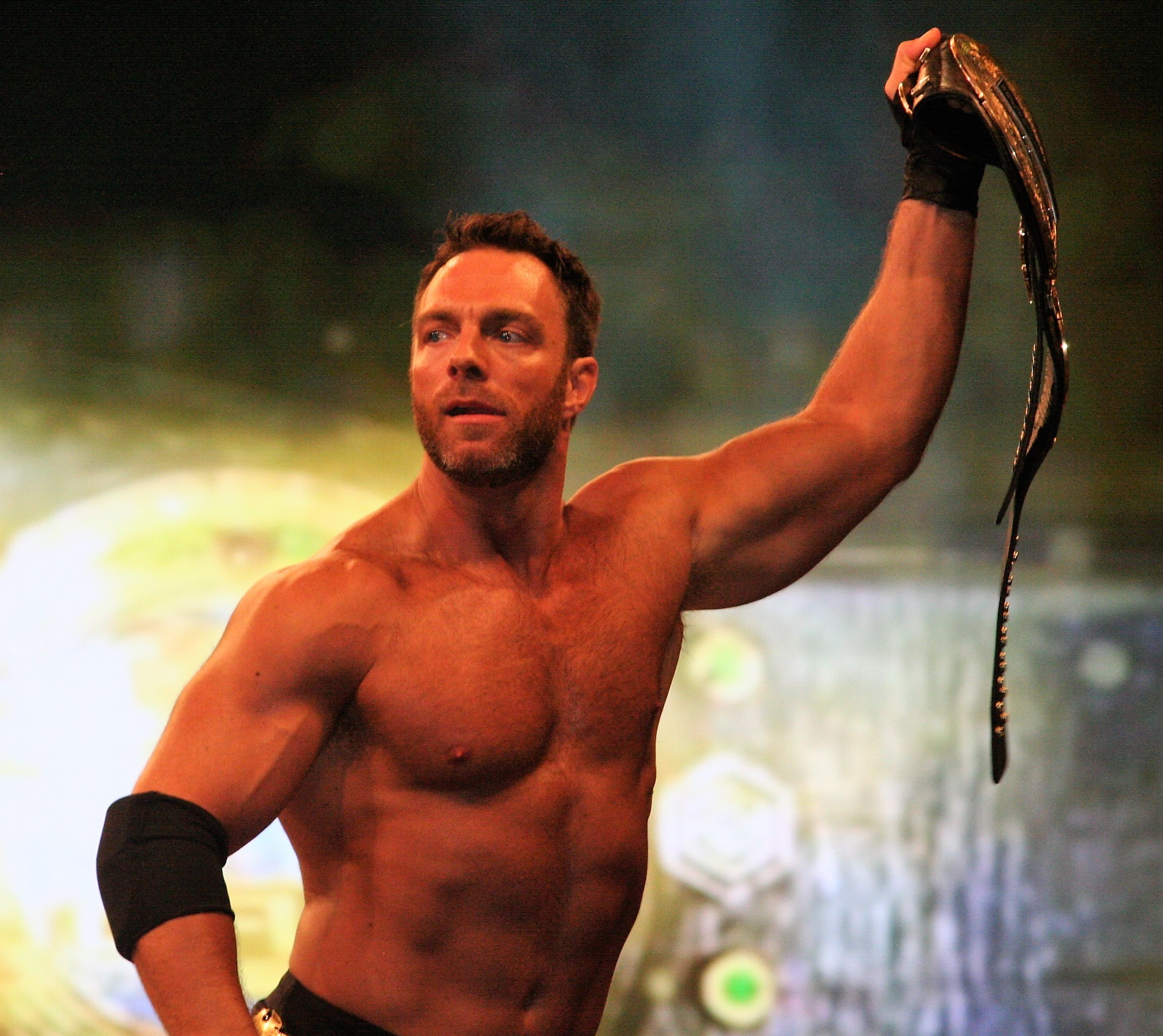
Drake as the Impact Global Champion at Bound for Glory in November 2017

On the August 24 episode of Impact!, Drake won a 20-man gauntlet match, as the second entrant, to win the vacant GFW Global Championship for the first time; it was later renamed to the Impact Global Championship. This was Drake's first world title reign from a major wrestling promotion in his career. He would retain the title against Matt Sydal on Impact, and against Cody Hall in Japan for Pro Wrestling Noah. Drake successfully defended the title against Johnny Impact at Victory Road on September 28, Bound for Glory on November 5 and at Genesis on January 25, 2018 in a Six Sides of Steel match also involving Alberto El Patron. He lost his renamed Impact World Championship on the February 1 episode of Impact Wrestling against the returning Austin Aries, ending his reign at 146 days. On the February 15 episode of Impact Wrestling, Drake failed to regain the title from Aries.

On the March 15 episode of Impact Wrestling, Drake won a briefcase during the Feast or Fired containing an opportunity for an Impact World Tag Team Championship match, which he refused as he no longer had a tag team partner. He defeated Moose for his World Championship briefcase on the April 5 episode of Impact Wrestling after interference from Ohio Versus Everything. At Redemption on April 22, Drake and his tag team partner Scott Steiner defeated The Latin American Xchange to win the Impact World Tag Team Championship. On the April 26 episode of Impact!, Drake and Steiner defeated LAX in a rematch to retain the titles. Two weeks later, Drake cashed in his World Championship briefcase against Pentagón Jr., but failed to win the title. After losing the titles to D&E (DJZ and Andrew Everett) on the May 17 episode of Impact Wrestling, Drake and Steiner had a match on May 31 at Under Pressure, which Drake won after a chair shot.

On the June 7 episode of Impact Wrestling, during his Fact of Life segment, Drake ranked Moose number one in his top five dummies in Impact. Moose confronted Drake later and challenged him for a match to determine the number one contender to the Impact World Championship at Slammiversary XVI. Drake accepted the challenge and attacked Moose. The following week at House of Hardcore, Drake lost to Moose. On June 25, Eli Drake signed a new contract with Impact Wrestling. On the July 12 episode of Impact Wrestling, Drake flirted with Grado's girlfriend, Katarina, during a backstage segment. This led to a match between Drake and Grado later that night, which was won by Drake. After the match, he tried again to flirt with Katarina, but Drake was stopped by Joe Hendry. On the August 2 episode of Impact Wrestling, Drake aligned himself with the Cult of Lee (Trevor Lee and Caleb Konley) and defeated Hendry and Grado. Drake issued various open challenges by this time, including one at Bound for Glory. At the event on October 14, Drake defeated James Ellsworth. After the match, Drake asked for a new challenger, a "Hall of Fame material" which resulted in Abyss, the newest Impact Wrestling Hall of Fame member, showing up and hitting him with a chokeslam through a table.

==== Feuding with hardcore wrestlers and departure (2018–2019) ====
On the October 18 episode of Impact Wrestling, Drake "sued" Impact Wrestling management for "unsafe working environment" after the attack of Abyss at Bound for Glory. On the November 8 episode of Impact Wrestling, Drake betrayed his lawyer Joseph Park after a low-blow. The following week, Drake criticized hardcore wrestling before being confronted by Tommy Dreamer. Two weeks later, Drake lost to Dreamer via count-out after walking away from the match. However, the match was restarted by Impact Wrestling management and became a No Disqualification match, which Drake won. On the January 3, 2019 episode of Impact Wrestling, Drake was confronted and attacked by Dreamer and Raven. At Impact Wrestling Homecoming three days later, Drake defeated Abyss in a Monster's Ball match.

On the January 11 episode of Impact Wrestling, Drake confronted Eddie Edwards, talking down about his hardcore style, leading to a match on the February 22 episode of Impact Wrestling, where Edwards defeated Drake with a roll-up. Shortly after, Drake formed a tag team with Edwards, challenging the Lucha Bros for the Impact World Tag Team Championship on the April 19 episode of Impact Wrestling in a losing effort.

During this time, a match was booked between Drake and Tessa Blanchard at United We Stand. However, he legitimately refused to partake in the match and criticized intergender wrestling, and was replaced in the match by Joey Ryan. After his comments, as well as statements he had made disparaging Impact's booking of him, Drake was fired via email on April 7, ending his four-year tenure with the promotion. Following this, Impact tried to lock him into a non-compete clause due to breach of contract. On June 4, Drake released a statement speaking positively about his time at Impact and announced that he was now a free agent.

=== Return to NWA (2019–2021) ===
On June 28, 2019, Ricker (as Eli Drake) appeared at the Ring of Honor event Best in the World, being revealed as the mystery partner of Nick Aldis and the newest person to sign an exclusive deal with the National Wrestling Alliance (NWA). At Hard Times on January 24, 2020, Drake and James Storm defeated The Rock 'n' Roll Express (Ricky Morton and Robert Gibson) and The Wild Cards (Royce Isaacs and Thom Latimer) in a triple threat tag team match to win the NWA Tag Team Championship. On November 10 at UWN Primetime Live, Drake and Storm would drop the titles to Aron Stevens and JR Kratos. On February 14, 2021, it was announced that Ricker had been quietly released from the NWA in late 2020 after only signing a new deal with the company a few months beforehand.

=== Return to WWE ===
==== NXT (2021–2022) ====
On February 14, 2021, it was reported that Ricker had re-signed with WWE. At NXT TakeOver: Vengeance Day later that night, he debuted as a heel under the new ring name LA Knight. He made his in-ring debut on the March 17 episode of NXT, defeating August Grey. At TakeOver: Stand & Deliver on April 7, he participated in a Gauntlet Eliminator for a future NXT North American Championship match, eliminating Dexter Lumis before being eliminated by Bronson Reed.

Knight aligned himself with Ted DiBiase on the May 25 episode of NXT after attacking Cameron Grimes during their segment. This culminated in a ladder match between the two for the re-introduced Million Dollar Championship at TakeOver: In Your House on June 13, which was won by Knight. During the championship ceremony on the following episode of NXT, Knight turned on DiBiase, attacking him before being driven off by Grimes. On the June 29 episode of NXT, Grimes challenged Knight for the title at The Great American Bash, which he accepted on the condition that if Grimes lost, he would become Knight's personal butler. At The Great American Bash on July 6, Knight retained the title against Grimes, who became Knight's butler per the stipulation. On the August 10 episode of NXT, Knight agreed to defend the championship against Grimes at NXT TakeOver 36 on the condition that DiBiase would replace Grimes as Knight's butler if Knight won. At the event on August 22, Knight lost the title to Grimes following interference from DiBiase, ending his reign at 70 days.

On the November 23 episode of NXT, Knight turned face by confronting Grayson Waller, who had turned heel by berating the fans. At WarGames on December 5, Knight teamed with Johnny Gargano, Pete Dunne, and Tommaso Ciampa as Team Black & Gold, where they were defeated by Team 2.0 (Bron Breakker, Carmelo Hayes, Waller, and Tony D'Angelo) in a WarGames match. On March 8, 2022, at Roadblock, Knight lost to Waller in a Last Man Standing match. The following week on NXT, he faced Dolph Ziggler for the NXT Championship in a losing effort. After this, Knight started a brief feud with Gunther, culminating in a match at NXT Stand & Deliver on April 2, which he lost in what would be his final NXT match.

==== Main roster debut and various feuds (2022–2024) ====
Knight made his first main roster appearance on the January 24, 2022 episode of Raw, participating in a backstage segment with The Dirty Dawgs (Dolph Ziggler and Robert Roode). In a dark segment before the April 15 episode of SmackDown, Knight appeared as a heel manager by announcing his new stable, "Knight Model Management", and became the manager of Mace and Mansoor. The angle went to television on the May 20 episode of SmackDown, when he made his televised debut on the brand under the ring name Max Dupri, adopting the character of a talent agent. On the July 1 episode of SmackDown, Dupri announced Mace and Mansoor, under the tweaked names "ma.çé" and "mån.sôör", as Maximum Male Models. Later that month, he was joined by his storyline sister Maxxine Dupri. Dupri ended his relationship with Maximum Male Models on the September 30 episode of SmackDown. The following week, he beat down Mace and Mansoor and reverted to his LA Knight persona.

After a brief feud with Ricochet, Knight became involved in a feud with Bray Wyatt in November and lost to Wyatt in a Mountain Dew Pitch Black match at the Royal Rumble on January 28, 2023; this was Wyatt's final WWE premium live event match as well as his final televised match before his death seven months later.

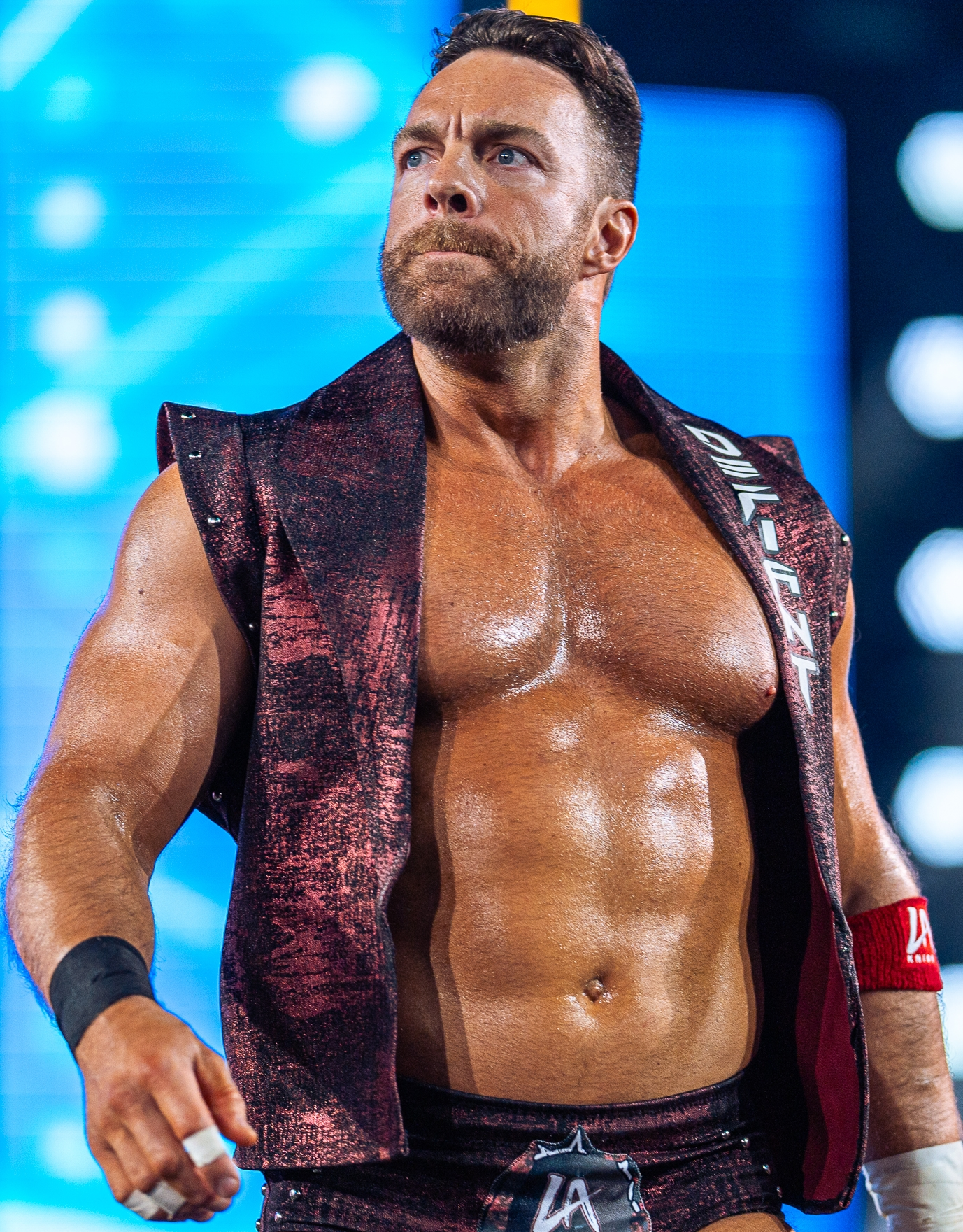
Knight at WrestleMania XL in April 2024

Over the next few months, Knight's popularity stayed with the fans even though he had a poor win-loss record. On the June 2 episode of SmackDown, Knight defeated Montez Ford to qualify for the men's Money in the Bank ladder match. At the namesake event on July 1, the match was won by Damian Priest, who threw Knight off the ladder to grab the briefcase. On the July 28 episode of SmackDown, Knight was confirmed to be an entrant in the Slim Jim Battle Royal match at SummerSlam on August 5, which he won by last eliminating Sheamus. Two nights later on Raw, after months of performing as a tweener, he turned face when he began a feud with The Miz. At Payback on September 2, Knight defeated Miz with John Cena as the surprise special guest referee. Two weeks later on the September 15 episode of SmackDown, Knight defeated Miz in a rematch, ending their feud.

On the September 29 episode of SmackDown, Knight assisted Cena against Jimmy Uso and Solo Sikoa of The Bloodline, replacing AJ Styles who had been injured by Jimmy and Solo. At Fastlane on October 7, Knight and Cena defeated Jimmy and Solo after Knight pinned Uso. Three days later, Knight returned to NXT as the special guest referee for the NXT Championship match between Ilja Dragunov and NXT North American Champion Dominik Mysterio. Knight would then enter into a feud with Undisputed WWE Universal Champion Roman Reigns, leading to a title match being announced for Crown Jewel on November 4, where Knight lost to Reigns after interference from Jimmy. At SmackDown: New Year's Revolution on January 5, 2024, Knight faced Randy Orton and Styles in a triple threat match to determine who would face Reigns for the Undisputed WWE Universal Championship at Royal Rumble, which ended in a no contest after The Bloodline took out all three competitors. SmackDown General Manager Nick Aldis then announced that Reigns would defend his title in a fatal-four-way match against Knight, Styles, and Orton at the Royal Rumble on January 27, which Reigns won by pinning Styles.

Knight competed in the men's Elimination Chamber match at the titular event on February 24, where he was eliminated by Drew McIntyre after Styles interrupted the match and attacked him. On the March 15 episode of SmackDown, Knight challenged Styles to a match at WrestleMania XL, which Styles accepted. On Night 2 of WrestleMania XL on April 7, Knight defeated Styles. The following week on SmackDown, Knight participated in the Undisputed WWE Championship Eliminator Tournament, defeating Bobby Lashley and Santos Escobar in the semifinals. Knight was defeated by Styles in the finals on the April 19 episode of SmackDown, ending their feud. In May, Knight entered the King of the Ring tournament, defeating Santos Escobar in the first round at a live event in Chattanooga but lost to Tama Tonga in the quarterfinals.

==== United States Champion (2024–2025) ====
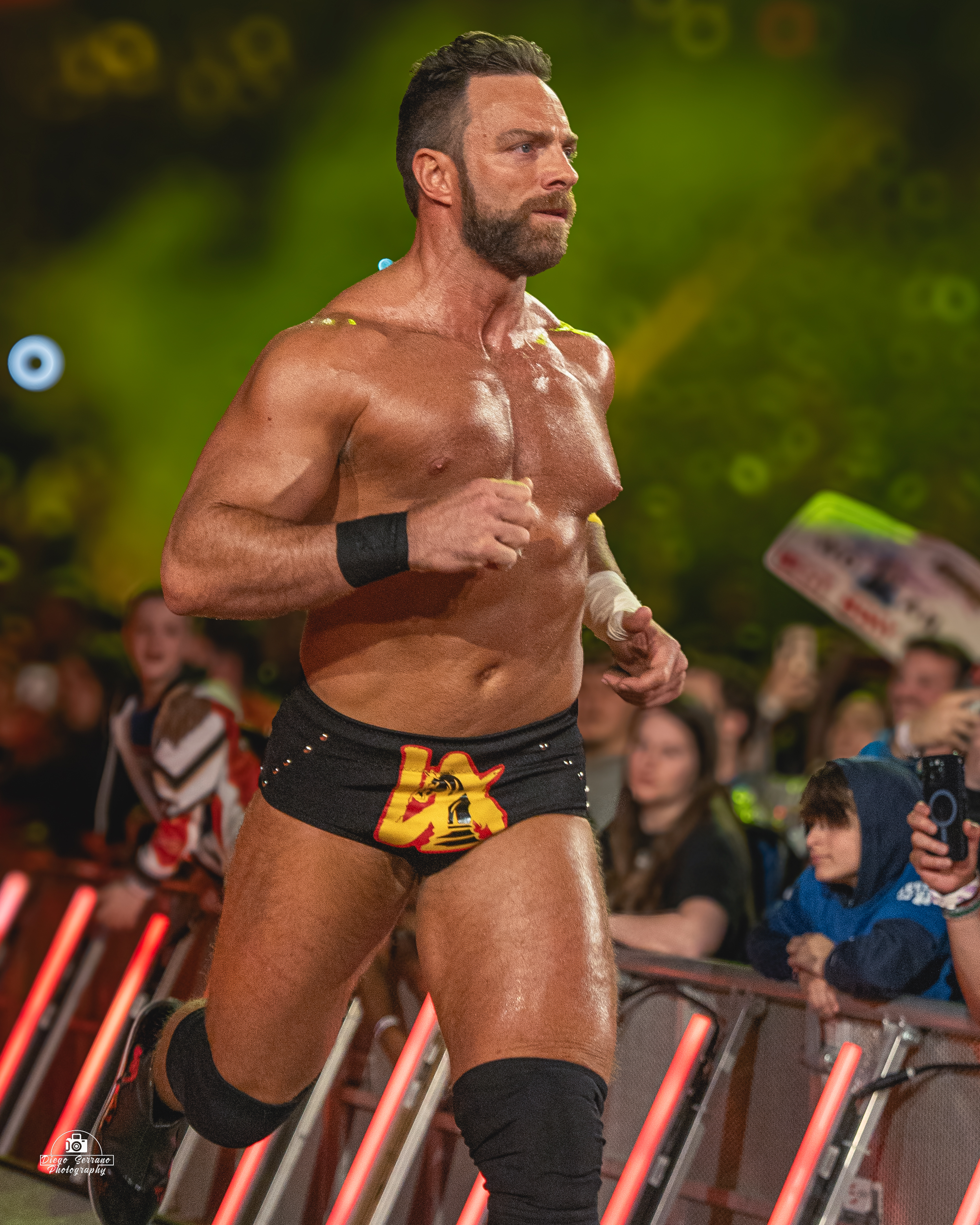
Knight in February 2025

Knight then began a feud with United States Champion Logan Paul, who he pinned in a triple threat match on the June 28 episode of SmackDown to qualify for the Money in the Bank ladder match on July 6, which was won by McIntyre. At SummerSlam on August 3, Knight defeated Paul to win the United States Championship. Throughout his reign, he successfully defended the title on SmackDown against Santos Escobar, against Ludwig Kaiser in Kaiser's home country of Germany, and in a triple threat match against Andrade and Carmelo Hayes at Crown Jewel on November 2. On the November 15 episode of SmackDown, Knight retained the title against Berto, after which he was attacked by a returning Shinsuke Nakamura. At Survivor Series: WarGames on November 30, Knight lost the United States Championship to Nakamura, ending his reign at 119 days. He received his rematch for the title on the January 10, 2025 episode of SmackDown, winning via disqualification after being attacked by Tama Tonga and Jacob Fatu of The Bloodline (led by Solo Sikoa, who replaced Reigns' leadership in mid-2024). However, Nakamura remained champion as titles do not change hands via disqualification unless stipulated. At Royal Rumble on February 1, Knight entered his first Royal Rumble match at number 29, where he eliminated Damian Priest before being eliminated by the returning AJ Styles. On the March 7 episode of SmackDown, Knight defeated Nakamura in a rematch to win his second United States Championship. On Night 1 of WrestleMania 41 on April 19, Knight lost the title to Jacob Fatu, ending his second reign at 43 days. At Backlash on May 10, Knight failed to regain the title from Fatu in a Fatal 4-Way match also involving Damian Priest and Drew McIntyre after interference from the debuting JC Mateo.

==== Championship pursuits (2025–present) ====
On the May 23 episode of SmackDown, Knight was able to win a triple threat match against Shinsuke Nakamura and Aleister Black to qualify for the Money in the Bank ladder match, which was won by Seth Rollins at the namesake event on June 7. After Money in the Bank, Knight continued to feud with Rollins, defeating him at Saturday Night's Main Event XL on July 12. On the August 4 episode of Raw, Knight challenged Rollins for the World Heavyweight Championship, but the match ended in a disqualification after CM Punk attacked Rollins. In the same month, Knight was quietly moved to the Raw brand. He failed to win the title from Rollins in a fatal four-way match on August 31 at Clash in Paris also involving Punk and Jey Uso. Knight then took part in the "Last Time is Now Tournament" to determine John Cena's final opponent, defeating Matt Cardona (reprising his Zack Ryder gimmick) in the first round, The Miz in the quarter-finals, and Jey Uso in the semi-finals, before losing to Gunther in the finals.

At the Royal Rumble on January 31, 2026, Knight entered at #21 eliminating Brock Lesnar, Austin Theory, and Bronson Reed but was eliminated by Cody Rhodes. At Wrestlemania 42 Knight wrestled in a Six-man tag team match along with The Usos (Jey Uso and Jimmy Uso) against The Vision members, Logan Paul, Austin Theory, and IShowSpeed. Knight and The Usos won the match, defeating their opponents by pinfall ending their feud. At Night 1 of SummerSlam on August 1, Knight teamed with Solo Sikoa and Royce Keys to defeat The newly re-formed Bloodline Jacob Fatu and The Usos. At Money in the Bank on October 10, Knight failed to win the World Heavyweight Championship from Roman Reigns. After that, Knight went on a hiatus, before returning on the November 16, episode of Raw, beating The Miz to keep his Team USA spot at Survivor Series

== Professional wrestling persona and popularity ==
Many fans have favorably likened Knight's brash gimmick and promo style to that of The Rock or "Stone Cold" Steve Austin, complimenting his recognizable catchphrases and considering his charismatic trash-talking character a throwback to the Attitude Era. The same comparison has also been made in a negative fashion, notably by former wrestler Kevin Nash.

Knight began to gain a notable amount of popularity in early 2023; despite his feud with Bray Wyatt being written to re-establish the returning Wyatt as a monster character, Knight's ability to hold his own verbally throughout the feud led fans to start siding with him. In an interview with Chris Van Vliet, he stated that he first noticed how fast his popularity was growing when the crowd cheered loudly as his entrance music began upon walking out to confront Drew McIntyre and Sheamus on SmackDown on March 3, 2023.

== Other media ==
In 2010 Ricker made his acting debut in an episode of Fatal Attractions where he played a used car salesman who was devoured by his pet Nile monitors.

In 2013, Ricker appeared on the TNT reality television show The Hero, hosted by Dwayne Johnson.

In 2015, Ricker appeared in the Brooklyn Nine-Nine episode "Boyle-Linetti Wedding" in a non-speaking role as Mario, a male bodybuilder who is getting married in a gym with Detective Terry Jeffords (Terry Crews) officiating.

In January 2020, Ricker shot scenes for the fourth season of the Netflix dramedy GLOW as a character named DJ Henderson, but the show was cancelled before the season could air.

In 2021, Ricker appeared in a CarShield commercial as The Overcharger, a heel wrestler dressed like an automotive repair technician and defiantly bragging about how nobody can stop him from unfairly charging used-vehicle-owning customers for repair work. He is instantly struck down by Ric Flair, the ad campaign's star and pitchman. When the WWE and Slim Jim rekindled their business relationship in 2023 Ricker's wrestling persona became the main figure in commercials promoting the brand.

As well as voicing "Paragon Jay Pierce" in the MyRise mode of WWE 2K22, he performed the motion capture for other WWE wrestlers in many of the WWE 2K games.

=== Filmography ===
| Year | Title | Role | Note | Ref. |
|---|---|---|---|---|
| 2006 | 12 Corazones | Himself, sign Scorpio | Dating spanish language reality TV Show | |
| 2010 | Fatal Attractions | Ron Huff | 1 episode | |
| 2013 | The Hero | Contestant | 4 episodes | |
| 2015 | Brooklyn Nine-Nine | Bodybuilder | Uncredited | |
| 2019 | Magic For Humans | Eli Drake | 1 episode | |
| 2024 | Celebrity Family Feud | Contestant | 1 episode | |

=== Video games ===
LA Knight in video games
| Year | Title | Notes | Ref. |
|---|---|---|---|
| 2022 | WWE 2K22 | Included in the "Whole Dam" Pack as DLC; Voice of "Paragon" Jay Pierce in MyRise | |
| 2023 | WWE 2K23 | | |
| 2024 | WWE 2K24 | | |
| 2025 | WWE 2K25 | | |
| 2026 | WWE 2K26 | | |

== Personal life ==
Ricker was in a relationship with fitness model Michelle Yavulla from 2018 till 2025. He resides in Orlando, Florida.

Ricker threw out the ceremonial first pitch at a New York Mets game on August 8, 2023.

On December 23, 2023, Ricker received the Key to the City in his hometown of Hagerstown, Maryland.

== Championships and accomplishments ==
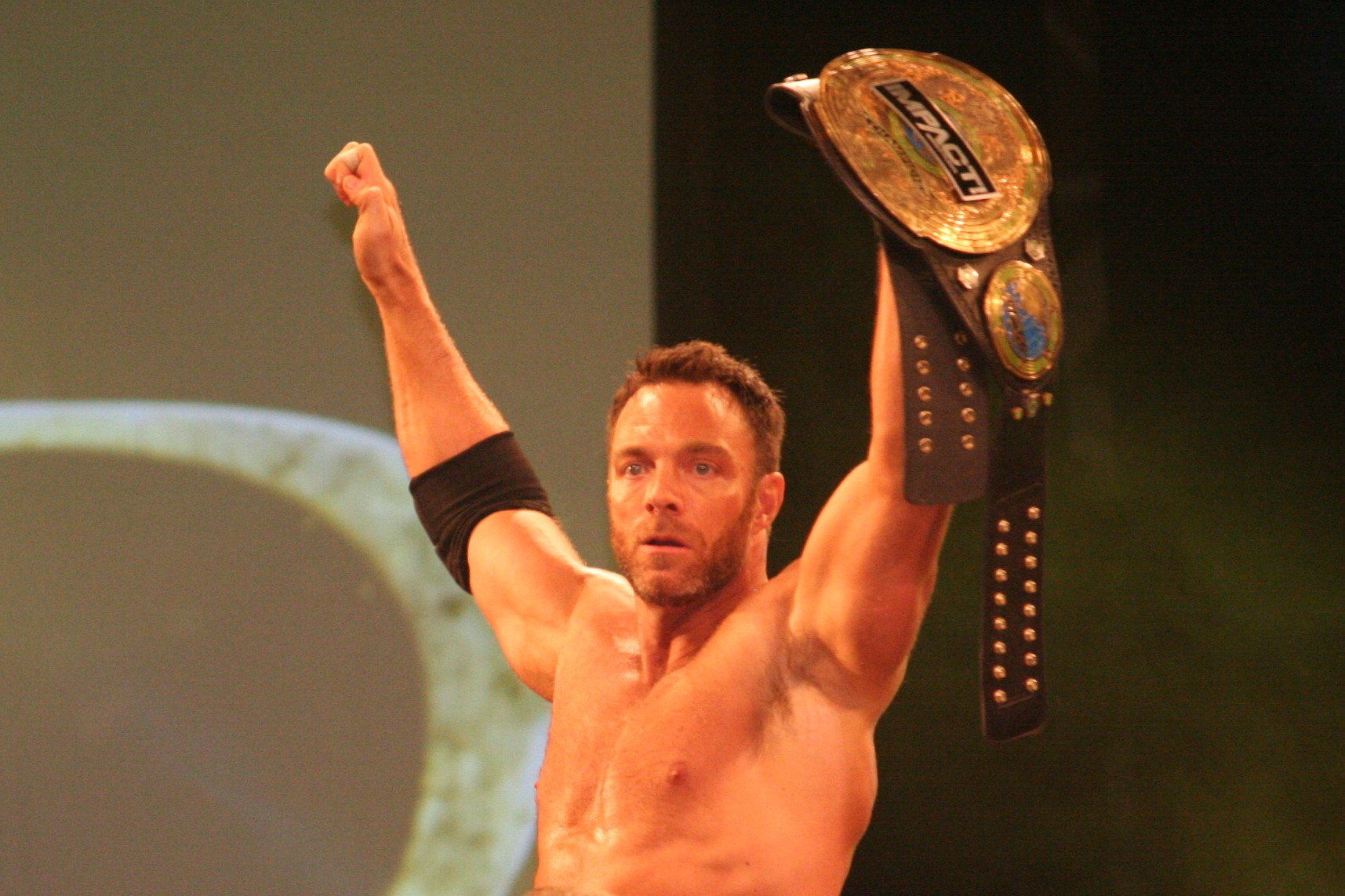
Ricker is a former Impact World Champion

- Championship Wrestling from Hollywood
  - CWFH Heritage Heavyweight Championship (1 time)
  - NWA Heritage Tag Team Championship (2 times) – with Brian Cage
  - Red Carpet Rumble (2013)
- DDT Pro-Wrestling
  - Ironman Heavymetalweight Championship (1 time)
- Empire Wrestling Federation
  - EWF Heavyweight Championship (1 time)
- ESPN
  - Breakthrough Wrestler of the Year (2023)
- Future Stars of Wrestling
  - FSW Heavyweight Championship (2 times)
  - Great Goliath Battle Royal (2011) – with Josh Dunbar
- Heartland Wrestling Association
  - HWA Television Championship (1 time)
- Match One Wrestling
  - M1W Tag Team Championship (1 time, inaugural) – with Brian Cage
  - M1W Tag Team Championship Tournament (2010) – with Brian Cage
- National Wrestling Alliance
  - NWA World Tag Team Championship (1 time) – with James Storm
- New York Post
  - Male Breakout Wrestler of the Year (2023)
- Pro Wrestling Illustrated
  - Most Improved Wrestler of the Year (2023)
  - Ranked No. 22 of the top 500 singles wrestlers in the PWI 500 in 2025
- Pro Wrestling Revolution
  - PWR Heavyweight Championship (1 time)
- Total Nonstop Action Wrestling / Impact Wrestling
  - Impact World Championship (1 time)
  - Impact World Tag Team Championship (1 time) – with Scott Steiner
  - TNA King of the Mountain Championship (1 time)
  - Gauntlet for the Gold (2016, 2017 – Heavyweight)
  - Race for the Case (2017 – Red Case)
  - Feast or Fired (2016 – TNA King of the Mountain Championship contract)
  - Feast or Fired (2018 – Impact World Tag Team Championship contract)
- Ultimate Championship Wrestling
  - UCW Heavyweight Championship (1 time)
- Wrestling Observer Newsletter
  - Worst Gimmick (2022) as part of Maximum Male Models
  - Worst Match of the Year (2023) vs. Bray Wyatt at Royal Rumble
- WWE
  - WWE United States Championship (2 times)
  - Million Dollar Championship (1 time)
  - SummerSlam Slim Jim Battle Royal (2023)
  - WWE United States Championship #1 Contender Tournament (2025)
  - Slammy Award (2 times)
    - Breakout Superstar of the Year (2024)
    - Fan Chant of the Year (2024) – "YEAH!"
