= Hugh J. McCormick =

Canadian speed skater

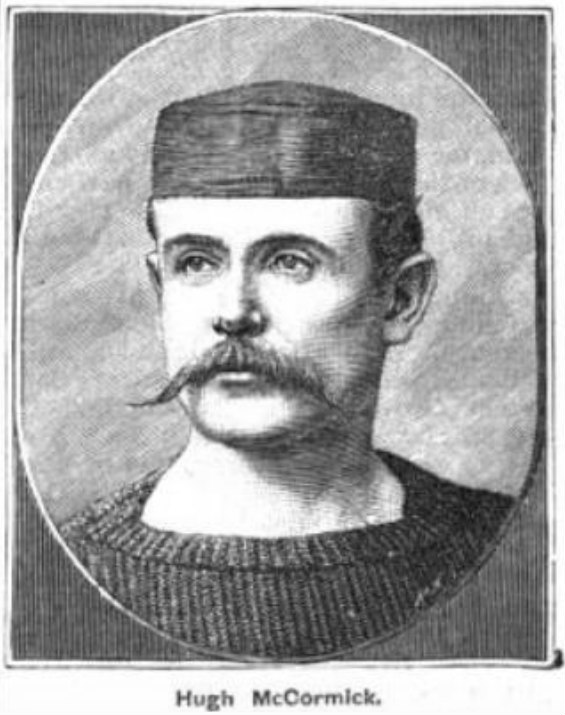
- Born: 1854; Kennebecasis Island, New Brunswick, Canada
- Died: 1910 (aged 55–56)
- Occupation: professional speed skater
- Years active: 1883–1895
- Known for: World Professional Speed Skating Champion (1890–1891)

Hugh J. McCormick (1854–1910) was the World Professional Speed Skating Champion from 1890 to 1891.

== Biography ==
Hugh McCormick was born at McCormick House on Kennebecasis Island, New Brunswick, Canada located at the confluence of the Saint John River and the Kennebecasis River. Because these rivers freeze over for most of the Canadian winter a very conducive environment is naturally provided supporting ice skating of all varieties; the local area has been a producer of many champion speed skaters.

His career as a professional speed skater spanned the years 1883 through 1895 and he held numerous championship titles including New Brunswick Professional Speed Skating Champion, Canadian Maritime Champion, North American Champion and World Champion. In 1890, he defeated reigning World Champion Axel Paulsen of Norway in a series of races held at Minneapolis, Minnesota to become the World Professional Speed Skating Champion. In 1892, McCormick travelled to Oslo (then Christiania), Norway to race the new Norwegian champion, Harold Hagen. Hagen defeated McCormick and was crowned the new World Professional Speed Skating Champion. McCormick raced Hagen a second time the following season in 1893 in a three-race meet at Minneapolis and was again unsuccessful. McCormick retired from professional competition two years later at the end of the 1895 season.
