= The Hero (2013 TV series) =

American television series

- Created by: Rick Ringbakk
- Presented by: Dwayne Johnson
- Country of origin: United States
- Original language: English
- No. of seasons: 1
- No. of episodes: 8

Production
- Running time: 55 minutes
- Production companies: Electus; 5x5 Media; 7 Bucks Entertainment; TNT Original Production

Original release
- Network: TNT
- Release: June 6 – August 1, 2013

The Hero is an American reality competition television series hosted by Dwayne Johnson. It premiered on TNT on June 6, 2013, and concluded on August 1, 2013. Contestants are tested "physically, mentally, and morally" for the title of "hero" and a monetary prize.

== Cast ==
Cast member	Age^{1}	Hometown	Profession
Lydia Callins	31	Los Angeles, California	Personal trainer/fitness instructor.
Rachel Cattelan McDonald	34	Little River, South Carolina	Single mother who works five jobs including coaching basketball and teaching dance.
Athena Lazo	25	Worcester, Massachusetts	Community-relations director for a fitness academy.
Darnell McAdams	32	Vancouver, Washington	Married field-service technician repairing scales and father of two.
Marty McCloskey	24	Centereach, New York	Construction worker.
Patty O'Neil	46	Ashland, Massachusetts	Married mother of three who works three jobs.
Dr. Dave Parkus	50	Beaumont, Texas	Trauma surgeon.
Shaun Ricker	30	Hagerstown, Maryland	Professional wrestler also known as LA Knight
Charles (Unknown full name)	39	Los Angeles, California	Married police officer.

^Note 1: Age at the time of filming.

== Challenges ==
Episode	Team	Hero	Temptations
1	Rappel and Climb	Darkness Maze	1 x $25K
2	Navigate the City	Dry Dock Box	2 x $35K
3	Jungle Trek	Centennial Bridge Riddle	5 x $35K
4	Bungee & Climb	Mile Swim	2 x $30K
5	Honesty & Bus Searching	Rock Searching	1 x $35K
6	Weapons Targets & Cavernous Abseiling	Endurance Stadium Quiz	2 x $35K, 2 x $50K
7	Reverse Abseil & Tightrope Walk	None	1 x $35K

== Game progression ==
Episode Title	First Air Date	Inactive Heroes	Team Challenge		Hero's Challenge	Temptations	Group Pot
Episode Title	First Air Date	Inactive Heroes	Stage 1	Stage 2	Hero's Challenge	Temptations	Group Pot
"Courage"	June 6, 2013	Athena, Darnell, Patty	Charles, Dr. Dave, Lydia, Marty, Rachel, Shaun	Charles, Dr. Dave, Lydia	Dr. Dave	Patty; Refused $25,000	$300,000
"Teamwork"	June 13, 2013	Dr. Dave, Lydia, Shaun	Athena, Charles, Darnell, Marty, Patty, Rachel	Athena, Darnell, Marty	Darnell	Darnell; Refused $35,000	$300,000
"Teamwork"	June 13, 2013	Dr. Dave, Lydia, Shaun	Athena, Charles, Darnell, Marty, Patty, Rachel	Athena, Darnell, Marty	Darnell	Shaun; Accepted $35,000	$300,000
"Trust"	June 20, 2013	Rachel, Marty, Charles	Athena, Darnell, Shaun, Dr. Dave, Patty, Lydia	Athena, Darnell, Shaun	Darnell	Patty; Refused $35,000	$300,000
"Trust"	June 20, 2013	Rachel, Marty, Charles	Athena, Darnell, Shaun, Dr. Dave, Patty, Lydia	Athena, Darnell, Shaun	Darnell	Lydia; Refused $35,000	$300,000
"Trust"	June 20, 2013	Rachel, Marty, Charles	Athena, Darnell, Shaun, Dr. Dave, Patty, Lydia	Athena, Darnell, Shaun	Darnell	Dr. Dave; Refused $35,000	$300,000
"Trust"	June 20, 2013	Rachel, Marty, Charles	Athena, Darnell, Shaun, Dr. Dave, Patty, Lydia	Athena, Darnell, Shaun	Darnell	Shaun; Refused $35,000	$300,000
"Trust"	June 20, 2013	Rachel, Marty, Charles	Athena, Darnell, Shaun, Dr. Dave, Patty, Lydia	Athena, Darnell, Shaun	Darnell	Athena; Accepted $35,000	$300,000
"Heart"	June 27, 2013	Darnell, Lydia, Patty	Athena, Charles, Dr. Dave, Marty, Rachel, Shaun	Charles, Marty, Shaun	Marty	Athena; Refused $30,000	$360,000
"Heart"	June 27, 2013	Darnell, Lydia, Patty	Athena, Charles, Dr. Dave, Marty, Rachel, Shaun	Charles, Marty, Shaun	Marty	Shaun; Refused $30,000	$360,000
"Honesty"	July 11, 2013	Dr. Dave, Marty	Athena, Charles, Darnell, Lydia, Patty, Rachel	Lydia, Patty, Rachel	Lydia	Patty; Refused $35,000	$430,000
"Endurance"	July 18, 2013	Darnell, Lydia, Marty	Athena, Charles, Dr. Dave, Patty	Charles, Patty	Charles	Charles; Refused $50,000	$510,000
"Endurance"	July 18, 2013	Darnell, Lydia, Marty	Athena, Charles, Dr. Dave, Patty	Charles, Patty	Charles	Patty; Refused $50,000	$510,000
"Endurance"	July 18, 2013	Darnell, Lydia, Marty	Athena, Charles, Dr. Dave, Patty	Charles, Patty	Charles	Athena; Refused $35,000	$510,000
"Endurance"	July 18, 2013	Darnell, Lydia, Marty	Athena, Charles, Dr. Dave, Patty	Charles, Patty	Charles	Dr. Dave; Refused $35,000	$510,000
"Sacrifice"	July 25, 2013	None	Charles, Darnell, Dr. Dave, Lydia, Marty	Patty	-	Patty; Refused $35,000	$610,000

=== Standings ===
Hero	1	2	3	4	5	6	7	Finale
Patty	Inactive	Active	Active	Safe	Safe	Safe	Safe	The Hero
Darnell	Inactive	Hero	Hero	Safe	Safe	Safe	Safe	Second Place
Lydia	Top 3	Inactive	Active	Safe	Hero	Safe	Safe	Third Place
Marty	Active	Top 3	Inactive	Hero	Safe	Safe	Safe	Fourth Place
Dr. Dave	Hero	Inactive	Active	Safe	Safe	Safe	Safe	Fifth Place
Charles	Top 3	Active	Inactive	Safe	Safe	Hero	Eliminated	
Athena	Inactive	Top 3	Top 3	Safe	Safe	Eliminated		
Rachel	Active	Active	Inactive	Safe	Eliminated			
Shaun	Active	Inactive	Top 3	Eliminated				

=== Money Table ===
Hero	Courage			Teamwork			Trust			Heart			Honesty			Endurance			Sacrifice			Total Earnings
Hero	Individual	Group	Charity	Individual	Group	Charity	Individual	Group	Charity	Individual	Group	Charity	Individual	Group	Charity	Individual	Group	Charity	Individual	Group	Charity	Total Earnings
Darnell				$0	$0	$0	$50,000	$0	$15,000					$0	$15,000					$0	$50,000	$50,000
Dr. Dave	$0	$250,000+$50,000	$10,000				$0	$0	$10,000		$0	$15,000				$0	$0	$0		$0	$50,000	$0
Lydia		$250,000	$10,000				$0	$0	$10,000				$0	$70,000	$15,000					$0	$50,000	$0
Marty		$250,000	$10,000		$0	$0				$0	$60,000	$15,000								$0	$50,000	$0
Patty	$0				$0	$0	$0	$0	$10,000				$0	$0	$15,000	$0	$0	$0	$0	$100,000	$50,000	$0
Charles		$250,000	$10,000		$0	$0					$0	$15,000		$0	$15,000	$0	$80,000	$0		$0	$50,000	$0
Athena					$0	$0	$35,000	$0	$10,000	$0	$0	$15,000		$0	$15,000	$0	$0	$0				$35,000
Rachel		$250,000	$10,000		$0	$0					$0	$15,000		$0	$15,000							$0
Shaun		$250,000	$10,000	$35,000			$0	$0	$10,000	$0	$0	$15,000										$35,000
Group Pot		$300,000			$0			$0			$60,000			$70,000			$80,000			$100,000		$610,000
Charity			$10,000			$0			$10,000			$15,000			$15,000			$0			$50,000	$100,000

== Ratings ==
=== Season 1 ===
No.	Title	Original air date	Viewers (in millions)	Rating (Adults 18–49)	Rank per week on Cable
1	Courage	June 6, 2013	1.53	0.7	#8
2	Teamwork	June 13, 2013	1.08	0.4	#14
3	Trust	June 20, 2013	1.02	0.5	#8
4	Heart	June 27, 2013	1.05	0.4	#15
5	Honesty	July 11, 2013	1.20	0.5	#9
6	Endurance	July 18, 2013	0.84	0.4	#16
7	Sacrifice	July 25, 2013	0.78	0.3	#13
8	Finale	August 1, 2013	0.98	0.4	#14
