= New Brunswick Route 850 =

Highway in New Brunswick

Route 850

Route information
- Maintained by New Brunswick Department of Transportation
- Length: 27.0 km (16.8 mi)

Major junctions
- West end: Route 845 in Kingston
- East end: Route 124 in Springfield

Location
- Country: Canada
- Province: New Brunswick
- Counties: Kings

Highway system
- Provincial highways in New Brunswick; Former routes
← Route 845	→ Route 855

Route 850 is a Canadian highway in Kings County, New Brunswick.

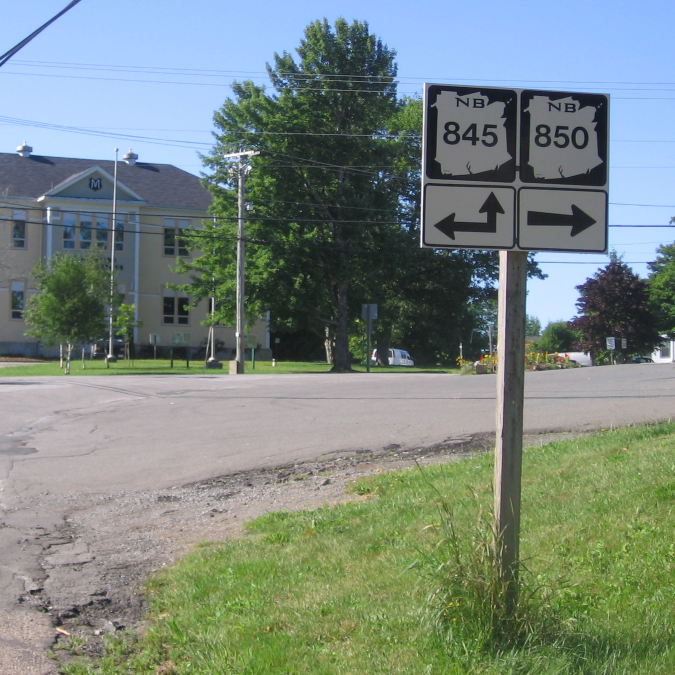
Route sign in Kingston, New Brunswick.

The 27 kilometre road passes along the northern side of the Kingston Peninsula.

Route 850 begins near Springfield at an intersection with Route 124. Skirting the southern shore of Belleisle Bay, the route passes through Keirsteadville, Long Point and Erbs Cove, before terminating at Kingston at an intersection with Route 845. Just north of Erbs Cove, there is a cable ferry across Bellisle Bay. The ferry operates year-round. Much of the route passes through a narrow band of low lying agricultural land with forested hills rising in the background. This is a popular summer residential area and there is a small marina on the bay.

== Communities along Route 850 ==
- Kingston
- Urquhart
- Erbs Cove
- Long Point
- Keirsteadville
- Springfield

== See also ==
- List of New Brunswick provincial highways
