= Kingston, New Brunswick =

Kingston
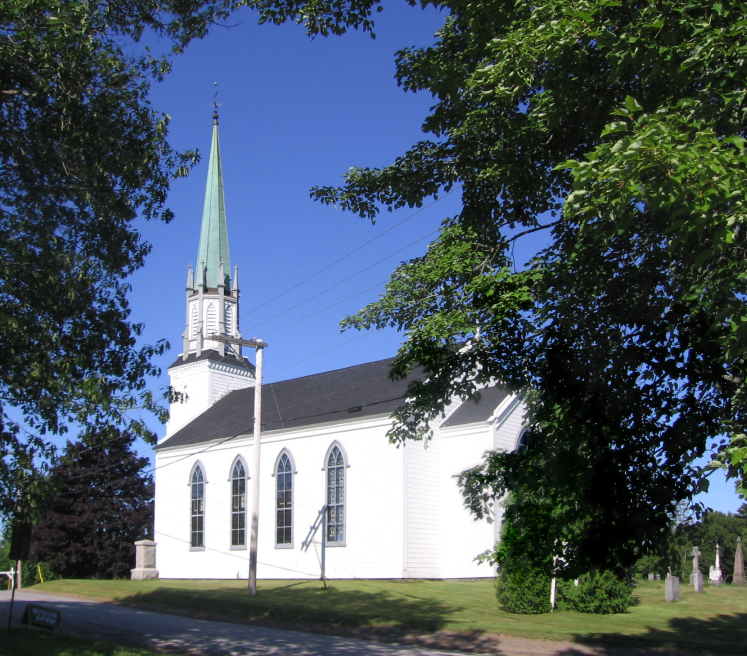
- Trinity Church (Anglican)

- Location of Kingston in New Brunswick
- Coordinates: 45°30′09″N 65°58′31″W
- Country: Canada
- Province: New Brunswick
- County: Kings
- Parish: Kingston
- Settled: 1783

Government
  - MP: Rob Moore
  - Provincial Representative: Bill Oliver
- Time zone: UTC-4 (Atlantic (AST))
  - Summer (DST): UTC-3 (ADT)
- GNBC code: DALRC

Kingston is an unincorporated rural community in Kings County, New Brunswick, Canada. The village centre is located at the intersection of New Brunswick Routes 845 and 850. The square features a school, church, and a general store built in 1788. The Macdonald Consolidated School also houses a museum. There is also a farmers market in Kingston which draws buyers from such areas as Quispamsis and Rothesay, New Brunswick.

Kingston is home to the Trinity Church, the oldest Anglican church in New Brunswick. Built in 1789, the church as well as its rectory across the street is a National Historic Site of Canada.

== History ==
Located on the Kingston Peninsula, Kingston was first settled in 1783 by Loyalists at the end of the American Revolution. It was previously the shire town for Kings County, before being switched to Hampton.

The Kings County Gaol was once located in the community but it was moved to nearby Hampton one stone at a time. The famous horse thief Henry More Smith once escaped from the jail.

== See also ==
- List of communities in New Brunswick
- Royal eponyms in Canada
