= Gondola Point Ferry =

Coordinates: 45.454953°N 65.981827°W

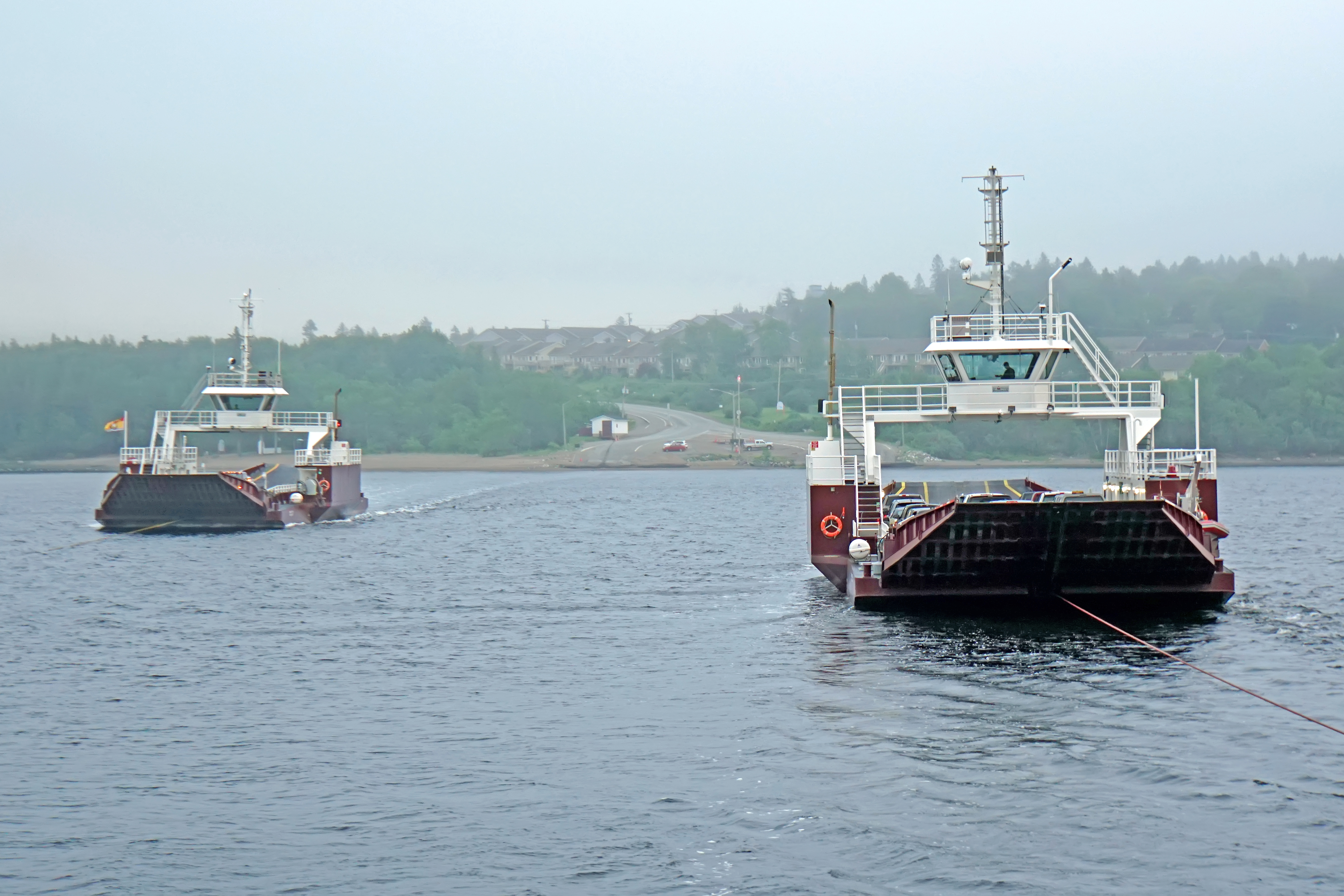
- Locale: Quispamsis and the Kingston Peninsula, New Brunswick, Canada
- Waterway: Kennebecasis River
- Operator: New Brunswick Department of Transportation and Infrastructure
- No. of lines: 1
- No. of vessels: 2
- Website: www.gnb.ca/en/topic/driving-transportation/bridges-ferries/ferries.html

The Gondola Point Ferry is a double-ended cable ferry crossing the Kennebecasis River in Kings County, New Brunswick, Canada. It connects Gondola Point in Quispamsis on the south bank to Reed's Point on the Kingston Peninsula, carrying New Brunswick Route 119 and linking it to New Brunswick Route 845 on the peninsula. Two cable ferries (R.G.L. Fairweather and William Pitt II) share the route, with each carrying up to 24 cars.

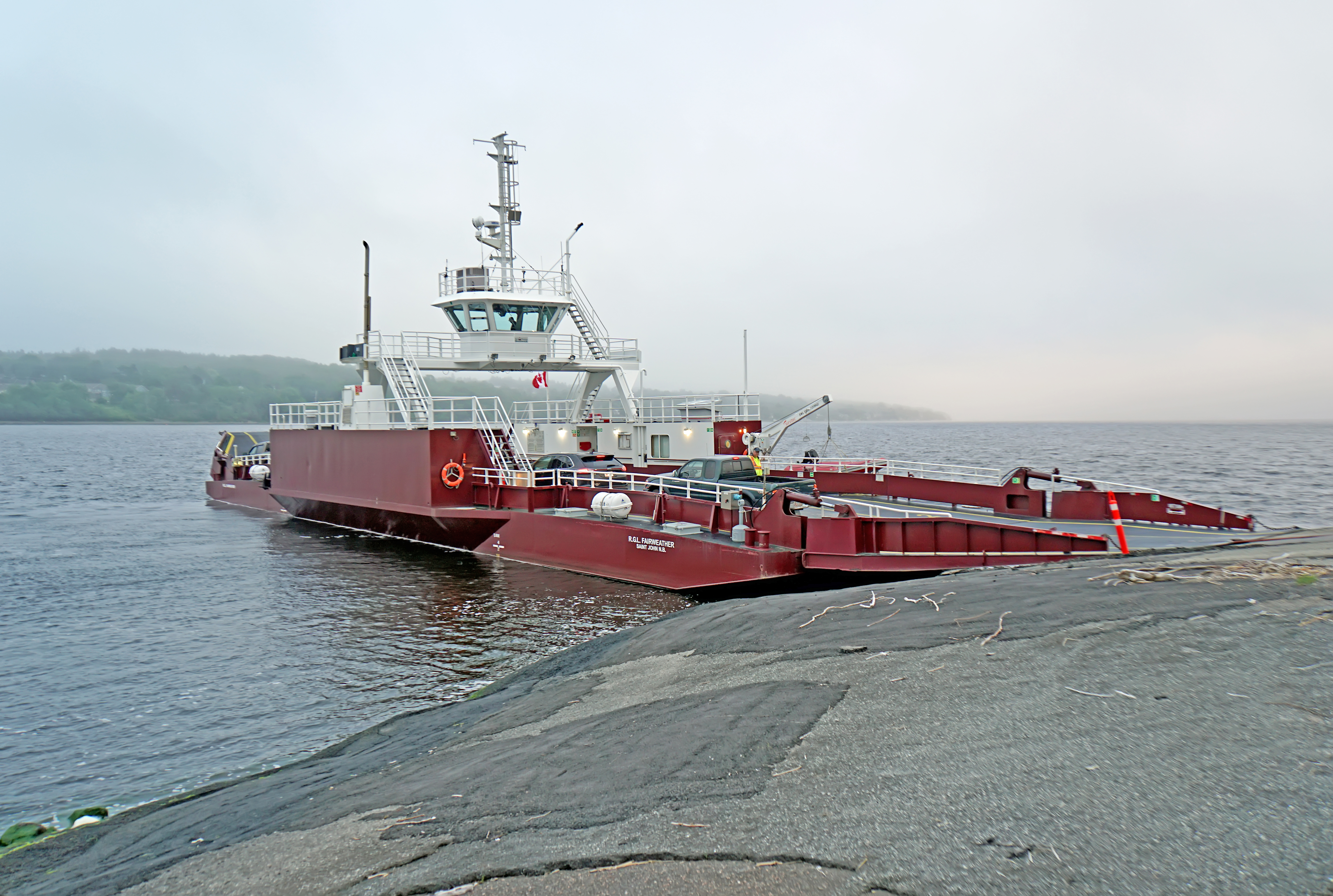
One of the ferries, the R.G.L. Fairweather (F98)

The crossing is 0.7 kilometres (0.43 mi) in length and takes 5 minutes. The service operates with a single ferry 24 hours a day all year, with the second ferry brought into service at busy periods.

The Gondola Point Ferry is operated by the provincial government's Department of Transportation and Infrastructure and is free of tolls. The two vessels carry roughly 1.5 million passengers annually.

== History ==
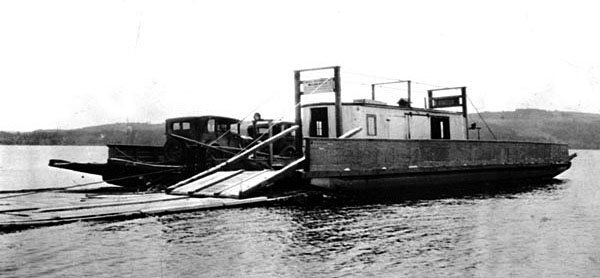
The Gondola Point ferry, c. 1930

Ferry service at Gondola Point dates back to as early as 1825.

By the turn of the 20th century, ferry operation at Gondola Point had consisted of a sail-and-oar scow until 1903, when Captain William Pitt invented the underwater cable ferry.

Vessels used to operate the ferry service were updated in the 2000s. In 2004, the 15-car Robert Erwin's passenger vessel certification lapsed, after which the provincial government commissioned the $3.4-million R.G.L. Fairweather which was officially christened on October 22, 2004. The vessel was named for Gordon Fairweather, a prominent provincial and federal politician in the area. The William Pitt II was commissioned in 2007.
