= Axel Paulsen =

Norwegian skater (1855–1938)

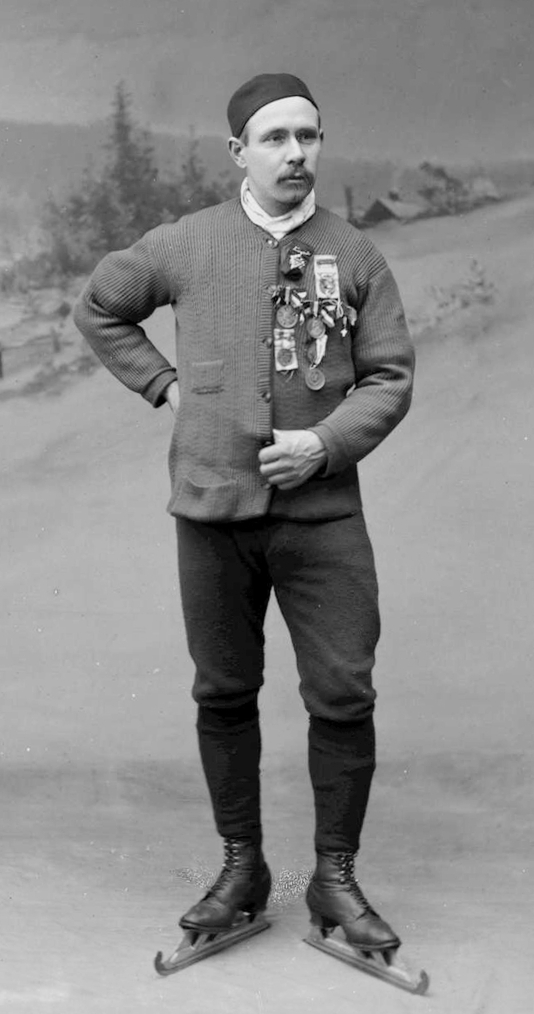
- Axel Paulsen c. 1895

Personal information
- Born: 18 July 1855 Aker, Norway
- Died: 9 February 1938 (aged 82) Nesodden, Norway

Sport
- Sport: Figure Skating, Speed Skating; World Speed Skating Champion (1882–1990)

Axel Paulsen (18 July 1855 – 9 February 1938) was a Norwegian figure skater and speed skater. He invented the figure skating Axel jump and held the world title in speed skating from 1882 to 1890. In 1976, he was inducted into the World Figure Skating Hall of Fame.

== Biography ==
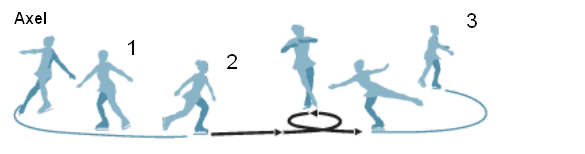
The Axel jump

Paulsen was born in Aker near Christiania (today's Oslo) to Haagine Olsen (1822–1918) and the merchant Johan Peter Paulsen (1820–1887). He grew up in Oslo, where his father ran a coffee shop. His sister was the soprano Kathinka Paulsen White and his brother was the composer Alfred Paulsen. He started skating at early age and by 1870 already competed both in speed skating and figure skating. In 1882, he won the World Championships in speed skating in Vienna and received an extra prize in figure skating for a new jump, which he performed while wearing speed skates and which was later named after him. In the winter of 1883, Paulsen went to North America to participate in a series of skating events. On 8 February 1883 a race was held at the open air rink in Washington Park, Brooklyn, New York. Paulsen defeated 17 picked skaters, the fastest from Norway, Canada, England, and the United States, and set the following records at the race:

- 1 mile: 3 minutes, 34 3/5 seconds
- 5 miles: 19 minutes, 10 seconds
- 10 miles: 39 minutes, 7 3/5 seconds

In early 1885, he won both speed skating and figure skating competitions in Hamburg, and on 26 February 1885 had a three-mile race against another famous speed skater Renke van der Zee at the 1885 speed skating race at Frognerkilen in Frognerkilen. The race attracted 20,000–30,000 spectators and had a prize of 1800 Norwegian krones. Paulsen won by more than one minute.

Paulsen held the world speed skating title from 1882 to 1890, losing it on 1 February 1890 to Hugh J. McCormick at a three-race meet in Minneapolis, Minnesota. Besides inventing the Axel jump, he constructed the first modern speed skates with a metal blade fixed to the boot. After the death of his father, he took over his coffee shop and ran it until 1936 together with his brother Edvin. He married twice, first in 1885 to the Welsh woman Kathryn Williams, the marriage being dissolved in 1890; and second to Anna Elise Nicolaisen (1865–1935).
