= Long Island (Kings County) =

Island in New Brunswick, Canada

- Location within New Brunswick
- Interactive map of Long Island

Geography
- Location: Kennebecasis River
- Coordinates: 45.389°N 66.043°W
- Area: 8.86 km^{2} (3.42 sq mi)

Administration
- Canada
- Province: New Brunswick
- County: King's County
- Parish: Kingston Parish

Long Island is an island in the Kennebecasis River near Rothesay, New Brunswick, Canada. The island is accessible by boat during warm months and by crossing the ice in the winter.

== Nature preserves ==
The island contains two nature preserves: Minister's Face Nature Preserve and Rayworth Beach Nature Preserve.
