= Worcester Music Festival =

Annual music festival in England

- Genre: Rock, Indie, pop
- Dates: September
- Location: Worcester City Centre
- Years active: 2008–present
- Website: www.worcestermusicfestival.co.uk

Worcester Music Festival is an annual music festival held in more than 20 venues throughout the city centre of Worcester, England every September. It was founded in 2008 by Chris Bennion as a platform to encourage live, local and original music in Worcester and the surrounding areas and is staged in pubs, clubs, cafes, community buildings, boats, churches, record shops and street performances around or near the city centre with around 250 performances each year. Recently acts have applied from further afield such as Egypt, Russia, Romania and America, however the organisers look at each application carefully as the festival is first and foremost about promoting emerging artists.

More than 20 different promoters are involved in the festival, which covers many genres of music. The festival is also closely linked to BBC Hereford & Worcester, with a stage arranged by Andrew Marston from the BBC Introducing show, and features acts that have appeared on the show being broadcast from the festival and the very popular SLAP Magazine. The festival is a non-profit making event run by an enthusiastic team of 20 volunteers, largely local musicians or people associated with the Worcester music scene. Not only does it provide a showcase for local musical talent of all genres, but it provides education and professional development opportunities through a variety of workshops and clinics.

The festival also has a history of being the place where new bands and projects have been formed, as musicians and artists have networked over the years. All Worcester Music Festival gigs and workshops are free to attend.

== Bands ==
The following artists performed at these previous festivals

=== 2008 ===
- 1147am
- And What Will Be Left Of Them?
- Angelcynn /Foxtail Soup /Ouja
- Anna Rice
- Babajack
- Black cat Bone
- Black Sheep
- BlueRADIO
- Brontosaurus Chorus
- Bruno Gallone
- BSN [420]
- Calm Like A Riot
- Calming
- Claire Boswell
- Cmajor7
- Cobweb Dilemmas
- Come Together
- Corda
- Crooked Empire
- Da Vinci
- Dan Greenaway
- Dandelion Killers
- Danse Macabre
- David Bristow
- Dissidence
- Doctor & The Duke
- Doctors Orders
- Drumlove
- Dudes Of Neptune
- Evangaline
- Expedestrian
- Fallen Angel
- Faullsgold
- Figures of Hate
- Fine and Shandy
- Flames of Our Neighbours
- Flo Rowland
- Flo Rowland
- FreewateR
- Fury
- Fusion
- Fusion
- Gamble Gamble
- George Cowley Experience
- Harlem Dandy
- Harry Payne
- Harry Payne
- Highway 5
- HiJack
- Host
- Hot Wyred
- Jamie Knight
- Jasper
- Jazica
- Jess Allen
- John Perkins
- Johnny Kowalski
- Judy Pass
- Jules Benjamin The Fingers
- Kahuna
- Lou Richardson
- Lounge Potato
- Martyr De Mona
- Matt Woozey & Strange Rain
- Meg
- Muleskinner Blues Band
- Natalie Hall
- Neil Ivision & The Misers
- Open Savana
- Penny White
- Pippa Jennings
- Poor Bob
- Reprise
- Revolver
- Robin Welch
- Rupert & The Robbers
- Sam Eden Experience
- Scandal House
- Shellshock
- Shoot The Moon
- Shurikume
- Silver Tequila
- Skankbox
- Slidin’ Steve
- Smokestack
- Somers Traditional Folk Club
- Soul Syndicate
- Steve Maitland
- Stunt Dog
- Take The Fifth
- Ten Fifty
- Tenth Aggression
- Terror Mob
- The Abbot Of Reason
- The Abbot Of Unreason
- The Amateurs
- The Arquettes
- The Big Cats
- The Brazilians
- The Cape Of Good Hope
- The Dastards
- The Donns
- The Fingers
- The Fire Balls
- The Lexie Stobie Band
- The Ragged Crows
- The Royal Alberts
- The Worrisome Ankle Trout
- The Zo Show
- The Magoos
- Untitled Musical Project
- Velvet Trick
- Wake (from the Dastards
- Warmoth
- Warpath
- Weak 13
- Will Dance For Chocolate
- WSRP
- Zanders Of Severn
- Zophie

=== 2018 ===
==== 14 September ====
- The Stiff Joints
- Skewwhiff
- The Fidgets
- The Miffs
- Howard James Kenny
- nth cave
- I
- The Lion
- Misanthropic Existence
- DEVILS
- Hump De Bump
- Bleeding Hearts
- Connor Maher Quartet
- Set em up Joe
- GagReflex
- 7Suns
- Lower Loveday
- Mice in a Matchbox
- The Other Dramas
- Born Zero
- The Desperados
- S K Y L Y T S
- Jack Monopoli
- Glitch
- Don Mac
- Liberty Artillery
- GOWST (formally Esteban)
- Trevino Slaxx
- Jack Blackman
- Elgar School of Music Folk Ensemble
- Horror On The High Seas
- Liar Liar
- Mark Stevenson
- Pre Sleep Monologue
- Niall McKenna
- The Pink Diamond Revue
- Parson City
- Anna Mason
- Shepherd’s Purse
- Dave Ryles and Barrie Scott
- Jake Of Diamonds
- Maefield
- Calming River
- Bitterroots
- 3WOD
- Institutes
- Don’t Mess with Katie
- Rebel Station
- Immy & The Boatman
- Hitchhiker
- Rod Willmott
- AnyPercent
- Copper Feel
- Andy Tyler and Ray Sanders
- The Cowleys
- Lycio
- Sean Jeffery
- Ruben Seabright
- Nobby von Wright
- Immy & The Boatman plus friends.

==== 15 September ====
- Swaktang
- The Humdrum Express
- Leg Puppy
- Nigel Clark (Dodgy) and compere for evening
- Jake Martin
- Criminal Mind
- Nasty Little Lonely
- Violet
- The Storyville Mob
- Vonhorn
- Kiss Me
- Killer
- The Collective
- Arcadia Roots
- Ivory Wave
- Yur Mum
- Inwards
- White Rhino
- SODEN
- Voodoo Stone
- Worcestershire Levellers
- Socket
- Grave Altar
- Johnny Kowalski and the Sexy Weirdos
- The Purple Shades
- Bloody English
- Colin Baggs Acoustic Guitarist
- Esuna
- Victoria Crivelli
- Flying Ant Day
- Polly Edwards
- Ross Angeles
- Twist Helix
- Dogs Of Santorini
- Stone Mountain Sinners
- Bryony Williams
- Plastic Scene
- The Atrocity Exhibit
- As Mamas
- I CAN
- I CAN’T
- Black Boxes
- Jess Silk
- Happy Bones
- Viv Bell and Huw Knight
- SLTR
- Free Galaxy
- Big Fat Shorty
- grownuplife
- Ellisha Green
- Bob Jones
- Vinny Peculiar
- The Contact High
- The Social Experiment
- Monkwood Green
- Deathly Pale Party
- Benjamin Dallow
- You Dirty Blue
- B.W.Pike
- The Arboretum
- Redwood
- Savannah (Savannahuk)
- Pablo Alto
- The Chase
- Dan Lewis
- B-Sydes
- Poorboys of Worcester
- The Boatman
- Hipflask Virgins
- Chloe Mogg
- Luke Wylde and the Japes
- Heartwork
- UnPunkt
- Blue Ridge Express
- The Jericho Racks
- Low Red Moon
- Tazmin Barnes
- Woo Town Hillbillies
- Bethany Roberts
- Wisenheimer
- Kringo Blue and Poppy Waterman Smith
- Jam Sessions – multi artists
- Worcester School of Rock and Performance
- Georgie and Dave
- Ajay Srivastav0
- Vo Fletcher
- Emma Howett and Lisa
- Gavin Miller
- Rubella Moon
- Bromsgrove Rock School
- Every Thread
- Freya MacKinnon
- Bandeoke with Polkadot Robot
- Nobby von Wright
- REG
- Social Outcasts
- Chip Langley & The Kidgloves
- Belly Fusion
- Song and tune session
- Rock Choir
- Guerrilla Studio
- Chevy Chase Stole My Wife.

==== 16 September ====
- The Hungry Ghosts
- MeMeDetroit
- Ten Tombs
- Junior Weeb
- Navajo Ace
- Rival Karma
- Tyler Massey Trio
- The Desperados
- Coat of Many
- Redwood
- Goldblume
- Danny Starr
- Chip Langley & The Kidgloves
- Riché
- Shiraz Hempstock
- Sleephawk
- Hey Jester
- Dan Hartland
- Thunder and the Giants
- The Strays
- Terminal Rage
- Hannah Law Band
- Sean Harrington
- The Lost Notes
- Vicki Pingree
- Kate Lomas
- RVRMN
- Amit Dattani
- MoZie
- Faith
- Electric Raptor
- Dharma Bums
- Blushes
- Balaban and the Bald Illeagles
- Rosebud
- White Noise Cinema
- The Naughty Corner Ukulele Band
- Mitch Loveridge
- Dan Greenaway
- B Movie Heroes
- ORE
- Colossus Yeti
- Polly Edwards
- Juniper Nights
- Stone Mountain Sinners
- Aaron Douglas
- Paul Lennox
- Drumlove & friends with Ital sounds
- Deathly Pale Party
- The Collective
- Jenny Hallam
- Oli Barton & The Movement
- Grande Valise
- Mutante
- Madi Stimpson Trio
- Flex
- Jay & Eli
- Collective 43
- The Jericho Racks
- Bird Brother
- Smokin Pilchards
- Immy & The Boatman
- Toad Pack & Pablo
- Bryn Teeling & The River Thieves
- VALA
- As Mamas
- Kringo Blue and Poppy Waterman Smith
- Neon Creatures (Louisa and Andy acoustic set)
- Big Fat Shorty
- Vince Ballard
- Leifur Jonsson
- The Fidgets
- House of Wolvxs
- Karyo
- VoxRox Choir
- Bring your vinyl
- eat and chill
- Play it again Dan
- Glitch
- White Rhino
- Howard James Kenny.

== Charities ==
Each year the Festival supports different local charities selected from a list of nominations. Money for the nominated charities is raised by way of donations and collection buckets at the venues. To date, the festival has raised over £55,0000 for charities.

=== 2008 ===
- Headway Worcester Trust
- Acorns children's hospice
- St Richards hospice
- Tudor house

=== 2009 ===
- Worcester Talking Newspapers For The Blind
- Choice Hospital Radio

=== 2010 ===
- Worcester Wheels
- Worcester Snoezelen

=== 2011 ===
- Maggs Day Centre

=== 2012 ===
- New Hope

=== 2013 ===
- Worcester Deaf Children's Society
- Worcester Sight Concern

=== 2014 ===
- Worcestershire Young Carers

=== 2015 ===
- Worcestershire Rape & Sexual Abuse Support Centre

=== 2016 ===
- Acorns Children's Hospice

=== 2017 ===
- St Paul's Hostel

=== 2018 ===
- Worcestershire Association of Carers
