= Clifton Royal, New Brunswick =

Rural community in New Brunswick, Canada

Coordinates: 45.450°N 66.002°W

Clifton Royal is a rural community in Kings County, New Brunswick, Canada. Located on the Kingston Peninsula, it is connected to Quispamsis via the Gondola Point Ferry.

== See also ==
- List of communities in New Brunswick
