= Millidgeville, New Brunswick =

Millidgeville
- Neighbourhood
- Interactive map of Millidgeville
- Location within New Brunswick
- Coordinates: 45°18′1.52″N 66°6′2.13″W
- Country: Canada
- Province: New Brunswick
- City: Saint John
- Postal code: E2K
- Telephone Exchanges: 506 428
- GNBC code: DAVKH

Millidgeville is a Canadian suburban neighbourhood in the city of Saint John, New Brunswick.

Millidgeville is situated on the northern edge of the city, on Brothers Cove off the Kennebecasis River at the point where that westerly flowing river meets the southerly flowing Saint John River.

== Royal Kennebeccasis Yacht Club ==
The tower of the Royal Kennebeccasis Yacht Club (RKYC) has been a beacon to boaters since its construction at the turn of the 20th century. The club was founded in 1898. In 1899, The Club published her Constitution, by-laws, sailing regulations, yacht routine, list of members, list of yachts, and signal code

Frederick Neil Broody designed the Royal Kennebeccasis Yacht Club club house in 1901. Royal Kennebaccasis Yacht Club received permission for use of the Prefix Royal and the Blue Ensign. In 1972, the Royal Kennebeccasis Yacht Club, Millidgeville, N.B. was honoured with an 8 cent stamp issued in Canada. In 2004, Herman Sullivan wrote about the Royal Kennebeccasis Yacht Club 'Gone to yacht : a pictorial history of sailing on the St. John River'

== Airplane Base ==
The first airplane base in Saint John was the seaplane base across the street from the Royal Kennebeccasis Yacht Club which operated from the early 1920s up until the late 1950s. Saint John's first true airport was built at Millidgeville. It opened in 1930 and was located in the area bounded by Millidge Avenue, Daniel Avenue, Marlin Drive, Woodward Avenue and Boars Head Road. The airport site was chosen because Millidgeville experiences the least amount of fog of Saint John and the surrounding communities. When the new Saint John Airport opened on Loch Lomond Road in the early 1950s there were a lot more complaints of flights being delayed by fog.

== Thomas Edward Millidge ==
Millidgeville took its name from Thomas Millidge who operated a shipyard on the peninsula now known as "The Moorings of Millidgeville" subdivision. During Millidge's time, there were over thirty large oceangoing wooden ships built at his "Kennebecasis Shipyard." Eric Lawson authored two books on the Millidge yard's ships; "When They Sailed The World - EGERIA & The Millidge Family Ships" and "The EGERIA - An Example of mid-nineteenth century New Brunswick Ship Construction."

Millidge sold his shipyard property to Edward D. Jewett in 1872. Jewett moved here from the US and had five sawmills on the lower reaches of the rivers (this would become his largest mill yard.) The mill employed close to 100 men in its heyday and many of them lived in mill houses on the property. Disaster ended the mill's operations on May 17, 1901. Three men were killed when the mill's main chimney fell. Two men, William Price and George McCluskey were over 100 feet high on the inside of the chimney repairing the masonry and Charles Wilson was inside the base of the chimney when it fell. The Mill never reopened and it burnt to the ground less than ten years later.

Lt. Cdr. G.G.K. (Don) Holder (WWII) purchased the Jewett Mill property from Jewett's heirs and started another shipyard following his service in the Second World War building sail yachts and small craft as the "Blue Peter Boat Works." The times weren't right and the business failed. Don Holder's father and mother Lt. Col. G.G.K. (Gordon) Holder (World War I and World War II) and Edith (Kee) Holder bought the land from their son and lived there happily for half a century while "the Colonel" operated a haulout and storage yard for pleasure craft until a disastrous fire destroyed many boats and the storage buildings. The property was later purchased by G.A.(Sandy) Robertson, a Millidgeville resident for half a century who developed the subdivision there now.

Other businesses in Millidgeville through the years were a number of small stores including John Tobin's General Store in the late 19th century, Walter Vincent Sr.'s store at the NW end of Millidge Avenue and W. Roy Giggey's Grocery store on the NE end of Millidge Avenue in the early-to-mid 20th century. The McCoskery family had a farm on Manners Sutton Road in the early 19th century and the Turner family had a farm on what is now the Kenneth Irving property on Kennebecasis Drive. The Ring family's boat service business started in the early 20th century by Grenville Ring and carried on after Grenville's death by his son Bob and now his grandson Geodie. Some families have lived in Millidgeville for several generations. There are still members of families who were living in Millidgeville prior to 1950 when development of the area started after the Millidgeville Airport shut down. There are members of the Seely, White, Giggey, Cobham, Holder, Craft, and Ring families still living in Millidgeville today.

Millidgeville had fewer than 100 year round residents until the early 1950s. Millidgeville was largely a summer cottage area for Saint John residents who wanted to get out of the fog. Development started in the 1950s on the former airport property and spread from there. New streets including Kennebecasis Drive, Daniel Avenue, Bedell Avenue, Woodward Avenue and University Avenue were constructed. With numerous side streets built off the main roads Millidgeville is now a bedroom community of Saint John.

Today, Millidgeville is home to the University of New Brunswick (UNBSJ) Saint John campus in Tucker Park, as well as the Saint John Regional Hospital, the city's largest employer and the province's largest hospital. Amenities include the RKYC, Rockwood Park, Canada's second largest urban park with a public golf course, the Charles Gorman Arena and several sports fields.

== Notable Buildings ==
Millidgeville, Saint John contains several major institutional and residential buildings. The neighbourhood is home to an Air Canada Call Centre, which serves as a significant local employment site. It also includes the Saint John campus of the University of New Brunswick, one of the city's primary post-secondary institutions.

Healthcare services in Millidgeville are centred on the Saint John Regional Hospital, the province's largest tertiary-care hospital and a regional referral centre. Residential development in the area includes a high-rise apartment building, Brentwood Tower.

== See also ==
- List of neighbourhoods in New Brunswick
