= Kingston Peninsula =

Peninsula in New Brunswick, Canada

Coordinates: 45°28′N 66°02′W

Interactive map of the Kingston Peninsula and surrounding areas

The Kingston Peninsula is a peninsula in southern New Brunswick, Canada, located between the Saint John River and the Kennebecasis River in Kings County.

The peninsula was the site of the first United Empire Loyalist settlement in New Brunswick in 1783.

The 2001 Census reports a population of 3,477 on the Kingston Peninsula, consisting of Kingston Parish and the section of Westfield Parish east of the Saint John River.

Communities on the Kingston Peninsula include:

- Bayswater
- Carters Point
- Clifton Royal
- Hardings Point
- Holderville
- Kingston
- Long Reach
- Reeds Point
- Shampers Bluff
- Summerville
- Chapel Grove
- Whitehead
- Gorham's Bluff
- Pipertown Road

Three ferries connect the peninsula to Grand Bay-Westfield, Saint John and Quispamsis (the latter of which was the site of the world's first cable ferry).

Route 845, which runs along the perimeter of the peninsula, is the main local road. There is also a seasonal provincial ferry (May–November) from Summerville to Kennebecasis Island, a small summer community in Milkish Channel.

== Bibliography ==
- Calder, Doris (1984). All Our Born Days: A Lively History of New Brunswick's Kingston Peninsula. Sackville, New Brunswick: Percheron Press. ISBN 0920187021.
