= Ring (name) =

Ring is a surname of Irish origin, deriving from Ó Rinn (descendant of Reann). It is also a given name.

Notable people with the surname include:

== Arts and entertainment ==
- Blanche Ring (1871–1961), American singer and actress
- Børge Ring (1921–2018), Danish film writer, animator and director
- Grete Ring (1887–1952), German art dealer
- Ken Ring (rapper) (born 1979), Swedish rapper
- Laurits Andersen Ring (1854–1933), Danish painter
- Liam Ó Rinn (born William J. Ring) (1886-1943), civil servant and Irish language writer and translator, best known for Amhrán na bhFiann, the Irish translation of the national anthem
- Thomas Ring (born 1980), Danish singer

== Politics ==
- Jeremy Ring (born 1970), American politician
- Merritt C. Ring (1850–1915), American lawyer and politician
- Michael Ring (born 1953), Irish politician

== Sport ==
- Alexander Ring (born 1991), Finnish footballer
- Bob Ring (1946–2017), American ice hockey player
- Brad Ring (born 1987), American soccer player
- Christy Ring (1920–1979), Irish hurler
- Henry Ring (born 1977), American soccer player
- Joey Ring (1758–1800), English cricketer
- Jonathan Ring (born 1991), Swedish footballer, brother of Sebastian
- Justin Ring (born 1973), Canadian football player
- Mark Ring (born 1962), Welsh rugby union player
- Nick Ring (born 1979), Canadian martial artist
- Royce Ring (born 1980), American baseball player
- Sebastian Ring (born 1995), Swedish footballer
- Tommy Ring (1930–1997), Scottish footballer
- Tommy Ring (hurler) (1939–2020), Irish hurler

== Other people with the surname ==
- Brian Ring, British architect
- David Ring (born 1953), American evangelist and motivational speaker
- Ken Ring (writer), New Zealand environmental skeptic
- Kenneth Ring (born 1936), American psychologist
- Kevin A. Ring (born 1970), American lobbyist
- Matthias Ring (born 1963), German theologian
- Ray Ring (writer), American journalist
- Twyla Ring (1937–2022), American newspaper editor and politician

== Given name ==
- Ring Ayuel (born 1988), South Sudanese college basketball player

== See also ==
- Frances Rings, Australian dancer and choreographer
