= Summerville, New Brunswick =

Coordinates: 45.358°N 66.086°W

Summerville is a rural community in Kings County, New Brunswick, Canada. It is served by the Summerville to Millidgeville Ferry, which connects it with the neighbourhood of Millidgeville in Saint John.

== Notable people ==
Emmett Hickey

== See also ==
- List of communities in New Brunswick
