= Kennebecasis River =

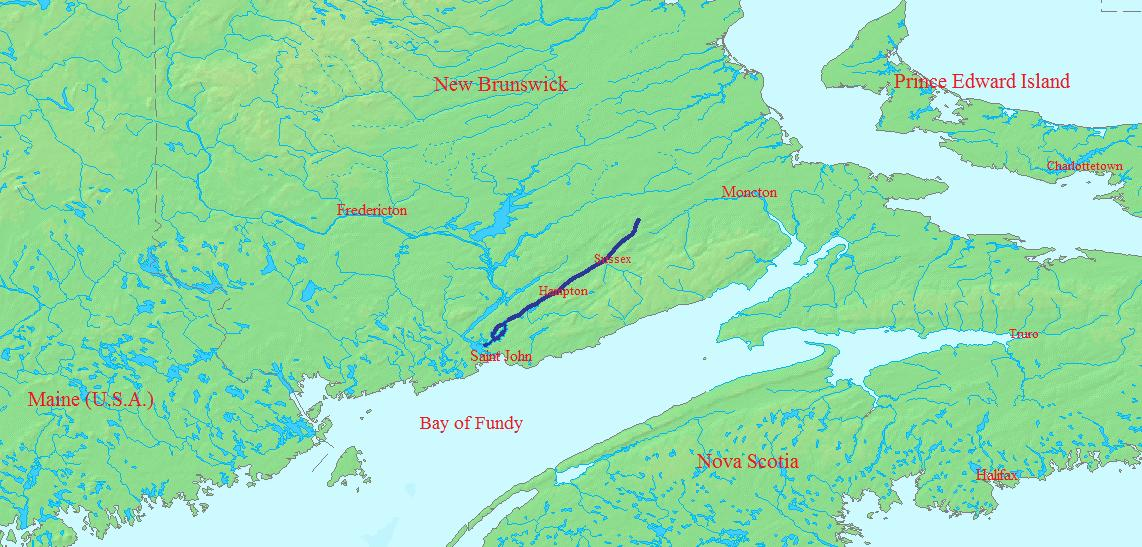
- Kennebecasis River

Location
- Country: Canada
- Province: New Brunswick

Physical characteristics
- Source
  - location: Saint John, Rothesay, Quispamsis
- Mouth
  - location: Grand Bay (Saint John River)
  - coordinates: 45°19′0″N 66°8′0″W
  - elevation: 50 m (160 ft)
- Length: 95 km (59 mi)
- Basin size: 1,346 km^{2} (520 sq mi)

The Kennebecasis River (/kɛnəbəˈkeɪsɪs/ ken-ə-bə-KAY-sis) is a tributary of the Saint John River in southern New Brunswick, Canada. The name Kennebecasis is thought to be derived from the Mi'kmaq "Kenepekachiachk", meaning "little long bay place." It runs for approximately 95 kilometres, draining an area in the Caledonia Highlands, an extension of the Appalachian Mountains, inland from the Bay of Fundy.

== Description ==
The river's source is in the foothills of Albert County, near the rural community of Goshen. It runs southwest through the community of Penobsquis; several tributaries join the river in the town of Sussex several kilometres further west.

Between Sussex and the river's junction with the Saint John River at Millidgeville (part of Saint John), the Kennebecasis River runs through a well-defined river valley which has become one of the primary land transportation routes in the southern part of the province, hosting the Route 1 expressway and the Canadian National Railway line to the Port of Saint John.

The upper two thirds of the Kennebecasis River passes through pastoral rural countryside consisting of Acadian mixed forest and various agricultural areas, notably dairy farms around Sussex. Southwest of Sussex, the river becomes increasingly larger as it passes the communities of Valley Waters and Hampton, before it empties into a delta-like area informally called the Hampton Marsh. West of Hampton, the Kennebecasis flows in a broad fjord-like glacial valley which defines the southern side of the Kingston Peninsula. At its junction with the Saint John River, the Kennebecasis River helps to form Grand Bay.

Several large islands can be found in the river, such as Kennebecasis Island just off-shore from Summerville on the Kingston Peninsula, and uninhabited (with the exception of a few summer cottages and an off-the-grid community on the southern part of the island) Long Island, located near Rothesay.

=== Hampton Marsh ===
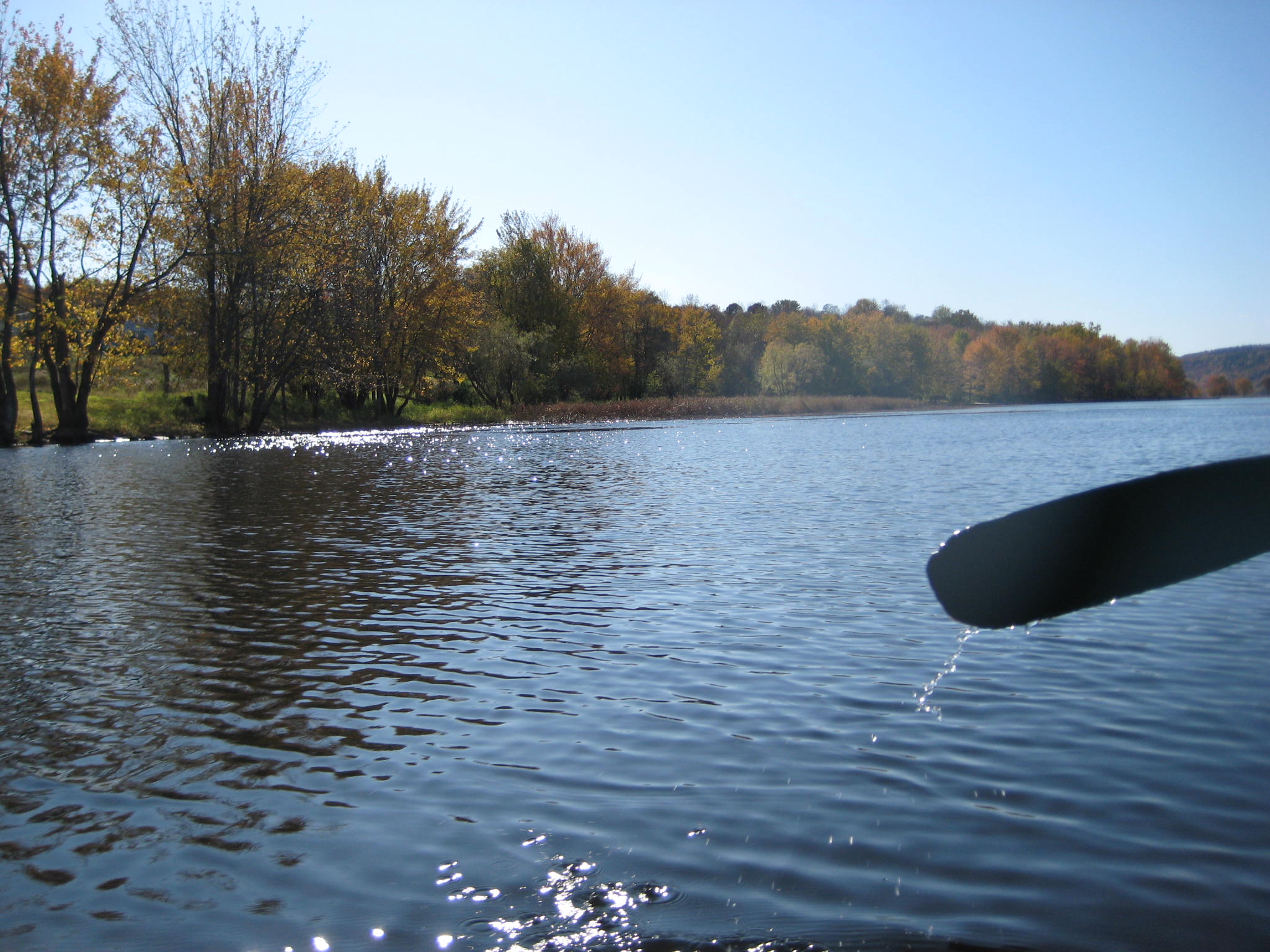
The river widens as it flows through the Hampton Marsh.

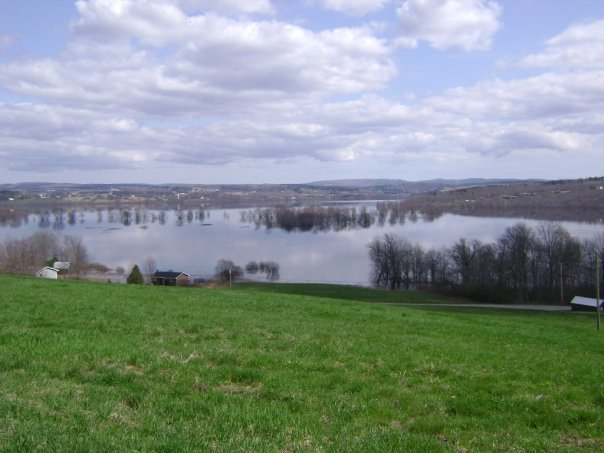
High water in the Hampton Marsh in April 2008.

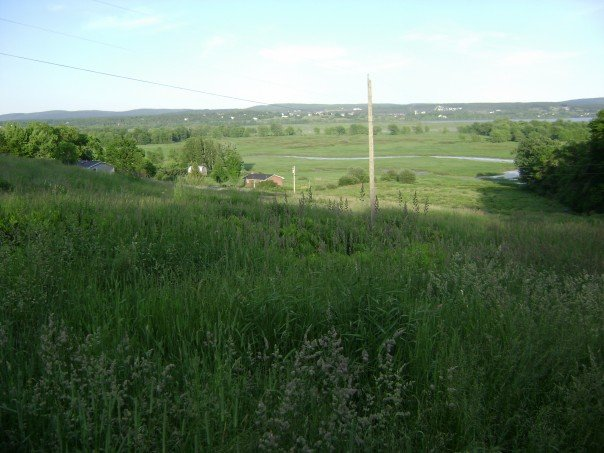
The same area in June 2008, demonstrating the difference in water level.

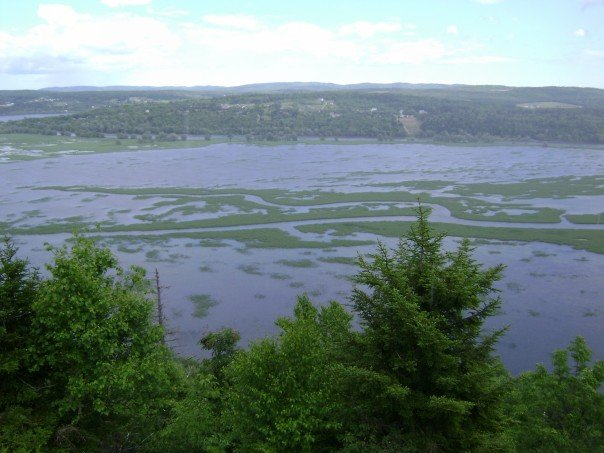
The lower end of the Hampton Marsh looking across to Darlings Island.

== Lower Kennebecasis River valley ==
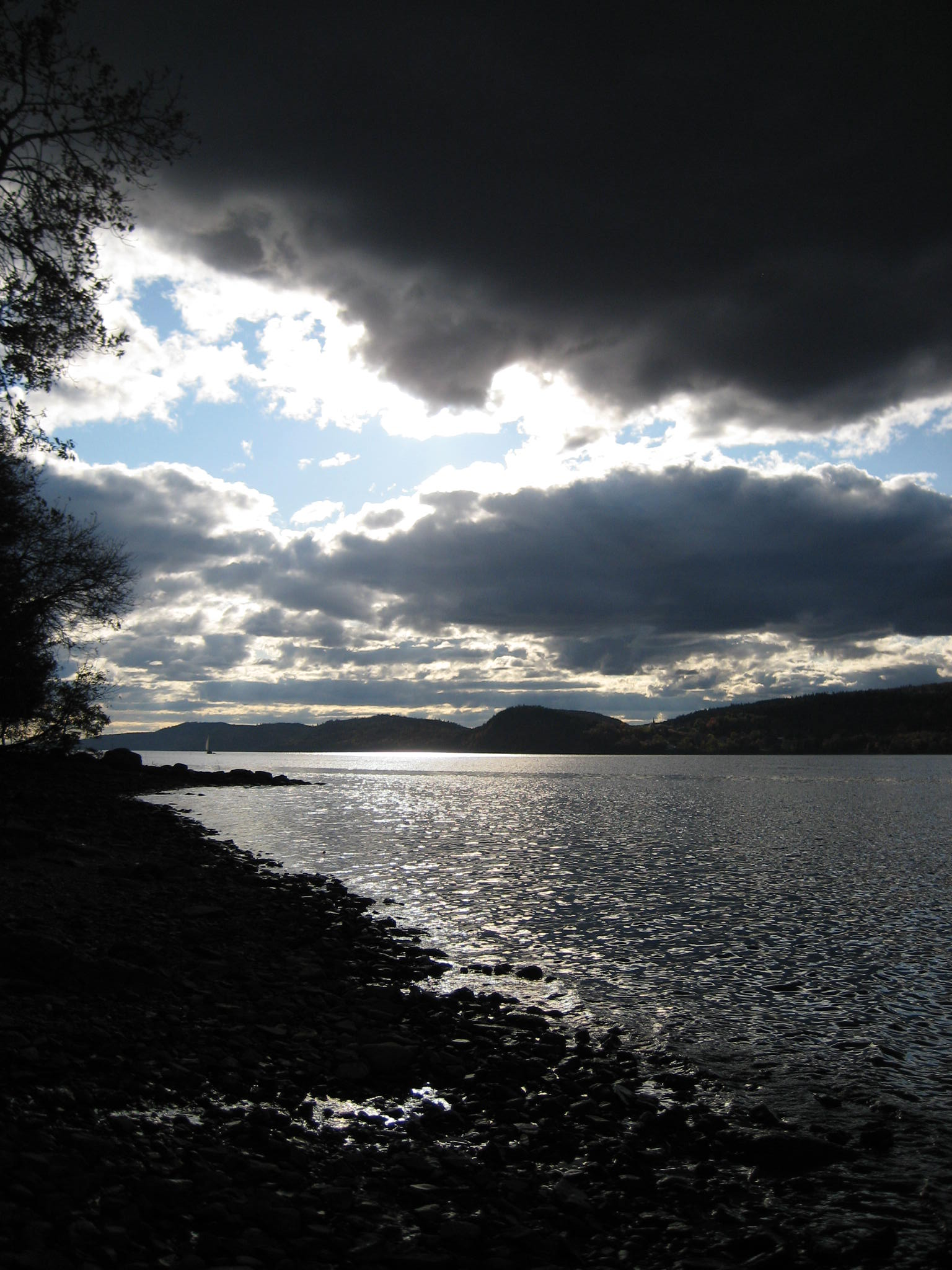
The broad river valley near Quispamsis, looking at the Kingston Peninsula.

The communities of Nauwigewauk, Quispamsis and Rothesay become increasingly urban as the river approaches its junction with the Saint John River. The lower Kennebecasis River valley is a largely suburban/exurban region of Saint John including communities within and outside of the city limits. The area is outside the summer 'fog belt' for the Bay of Fundy and enjoys more sunshine year-round than Saint John. It is also substantially colder in winter than the Bay of Fundy microclimates found in coastal areas of Saint John.

"The Valley" or "KV", as the lower Kennebecasis River valley is called by locals, has experienced dramatic population growth over the past several decades, largely owing to the development of Route 1 through the area in the 1960s. Once a minor dormitory suburb of the Saint John area, the towns of Rothesay and Quispamsis constitute a moderately-sized population centre with some commercial development. Saint John, by contrast, has suffered from an erosion of its tax and commercial bases as population and businesses have migrated away from the urban core.

The Kennebecasis effectively isolates the Kingston Peninsula from suburban sprawl. It is crossed by two ferry services, the Gondola Point Ferry that connects Gondola Point to Reeds Point, and the Summerville to Millidgeville Ferry that connects Millidgeville to Summerville. A third ferry service, the Kennebecasis Island Ferry connects Summerville to Kennebecasis Island. Several controversial proposals have been made in recent decades to build a highway bridge over the Kennebecasis River to the Kingston Peninsula however this has been rejected by numerous provincial governments citing financial pressures as well as the likelihood of suburban sprawl occurring in this farming area as a result.

The Kennebecasis River valley communities have rich histories; many were settled by Loyalists in the 1780s and 1790s who traveled upriver from Saint John to land grants offered by the British government. They became more prominent during the late 1800s following construction of the European and North American Railway through the area, which allowed for easier travel between Saint John and Moncton. Over the ensuing decades, the lower Kennebecasis River valley became a summer vacation destination for wealthy Maritimers, Americans and central Canadians. It is also a popular cruising destination for recreational boating as a result of its connection with the navigable portions of the Saint John River.

== See also ==
- List of bodies of water of New Brunswick
