= Kennebecasis Valley =

- Region of Greater Saint John
- Country: Canada
- Province: New Brunswick
- Counties: Saint John County, Kings County
- Boroughs: List: Quispamsis; Rothesay

Area
  - Total: 91.56 km^{2} (35.35 sq mi)

Population (2021)
  - Total: 30,745
  - Density: 335.8/km^{2} (869.7/sq mi)
- Time zone: UTC−04:00 (AST)
  - Summer (DST): UTC−03:00 (ADT)
- Website: kennebecasis.com

The Kennebecasis Valley, also known as simply Kennebecasis (/kɛnəbəˈkeɪsɪs/ ken-ə-bə-KAY-sis), its abbreviated term KV, as well as "The Valley," is a region of Greater Saint John. Situated along the Kennebecasis River, it encompasses the bedroom communities of Quispamsis and Rothesay, outlying suburbs of Saint John, New Brunswick located outside the city limits.

The Kennebecasis Valley has its own regional police force and fire department, the Kennebecasis Valley Fire Department, which has two stations, one in each town. Both of these departments overlook both Quispamsis and Rothesay. The Kennebecasis Valley is known for its large deer population, with the area having its own Nuisance Deer Management Assistance Program.

== History ==
Although there is no recollection of how the Kennebecasis Valley began, there is the existence of the Kennebecasis Valley Women's Institute which stretches as far back as 1917. In 1972, the Kennebecasis Valley was described as encompassing six communities, those being Rothesay, Quispamsis, Renforth, Gondola Point, Fairvale, and East Riverside-Kinghurst. Following the January 1, 1998 amalgamations of the former communities into either Quispamsis or Rothesay, the communities encompassed by the Kennebecasis Valley lowered to two.

== Education ==
The Kennebecasis Valley has two high schools: Rothesay High School for Rothesay, and Kennebecasis Valley High School for Quispamsis. At one point, Kennebecasis Valley High School served the entire Kennebecasis Valley as well as the nearby town of Hampton prior to the openings of Hampton High School (1992) and Rothesay High School (1998).

== Events ==
In 1997, the first annual Kennebecasis Valley Summer Festival was held by establishments along the Old Hampton Road in Quispamsis and former village of Fairvale.

The Kennebecasis Valley has its own Santa Claus parade hosted annually by both towns. The KV Santa Claus Parade is held in late November, starting at the Kennebecasis Valley High School and stretching about 4 kilometres (2.5 mi) down Hampton Road.
