= Rothesay Parish, New Brunswick =

Coordinates: 45.381301°N 65.970583°W

Rothesay
- Parish
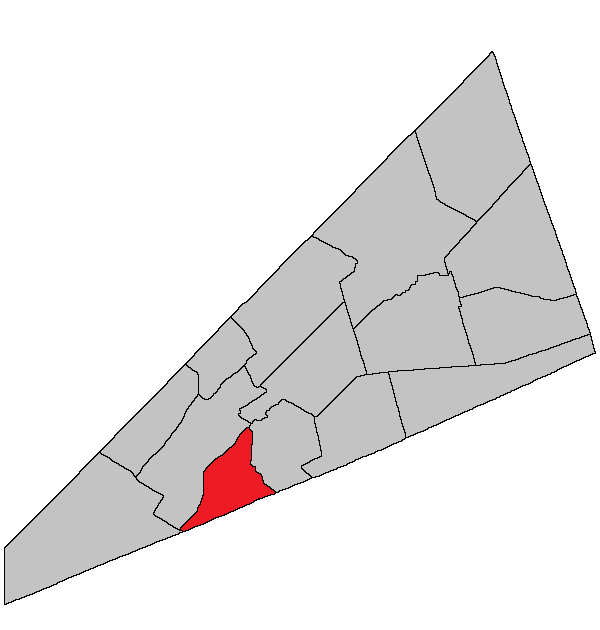
- Location within Kings County, New Brunswick.
- Country: Canada
- Province: New Brunswick
- County: Kings County
- Erected: 1870

Area
  - Land: 7.26 km^{2} (2.80 sq mi)

Population (2021)
  - Total: 342
  - Density: 47.1/km^{2} (122/sq mi)
  - Change 2016-2021: ▲5.2%
  - Dwellings: 134
- Time zone: UTC-4 (AST)
  - Summer (DST): UTC-3 (ADT)
- Figures do not include portion within the towns of Quispamsis and Rothesay

Rothesay is a geographic parish in Kings County, New Brunswick, Canada.

Prior to the 2023 governance reform, it was divided for governance purposes between the towns of Rothesay and Quispamsis and the local service district of the parish of Rothesay, all of which were members of the Fundy Regional Service Commission (FRSC).

== Origin of name ==
The parish may have been named in honour of the Duke of Rothesay, one of the hereditary titles of the Prince of Wales, who visited the area in 1860 as part of his tour of North America.

== History ==
Rothesay was erected from Hampton Parish in 1870.

In 1873 the boundary with Hampton was clarified among the islands of Hammond River and altered to run along grant lines on the mainland.

== Boundaries ==
Rothesay Parish is bounded:

- on the northwest by the Kennebecasis River;
- on the east by a line running up the Hammond River through its eastern channel, passing to the west of Darlings Island, past the island upriver of Darlings Island, then along grant lines through two islands, then upriver to a point about 675 metres upriver of Route 1, then south-southeasterly along a line about 300 metres west of, and parallel to, the eastern line of a grant to Zephaniah Kingsley to the rear line of the grant, then easterly along the grant line to the northeastern corner of a grant to Samuel Storms, then southeasterly along the eastern line of the Storms grant to the Saint John County line;
- on the south by the Saint John County line.

== Communities ==
Communities at least partly within the parish; bold indicates an incorporated municipality

- French Village
- **Quispamsis**
  - Blairs
  - Gondola Point
  - Hammond River
  - Meenans Corner
  - Otty Glen
  - Ritchie Lake
  - Stoneycroft
- **Rothesay**
  - Barsa Subdivision
  - East Riverside-Kinghurst
  - Fairvale
  - Hillhurst
  - Kennebecasis Park
  - Renforth
  - Upper Golden Grove
  - Wells

== Bodies of water ==
Bodies of water (Note: Not including brooks, ponds or coves.) at least partly in the parish:

- Hammond River
- Kennebecasis River
- Salmon Creek
- Allison Lake
- Bay Lake
- Bradley Lakes
- Duck Lake
- Hunter Lake
- MacFarlane Lake
- McKeever Lake
- McLachlan Lake
- Ritchie Lake

== Conservation areas ==
Parks, historic sites, and related entities in the parish.

- Stoneycroft Provincial Historic Site

== Demographics ==
Parish population total does not include Quispamsis and the town of Rothesay

=== Population ===
Population trend

Census	Population	Change (%)
2016	325	▼6.3%
2011	347	▼0.9%
2006	350	▲11.5%
2001	314	▲0.0%

=== Language ===
Mother tongue (2016)

Language	Population	Pct (%)
English only	285	87.7%
French only	35	10.8%
Both English and French	0	0%
Other languages	5	1.5%

== Access Routes ==
Highways and numbered routes that run through the parish, including external routes that start or finish at the parish limits:

- **Highways**
  - Route 1
- **Principal Routes**
- Route 100
- Route 111
- Secondary Routes:
  - Route 860
- External Routes:
  - None

== See also ==
- List of parishes in New Brunswick
