= Kennebecasis =

Kennebecasis often refers to the Kennebecasis River and surrounding Kennebecasis Valley in New Brunswick, Canada. It can also mean:

== New Brunswick, Canada ==
- Kennebecasis Island, an island in the Kennebecasis River.
- Kennebecasis Valley High School
- Kennebecasis (electoral district), a riding that elects members to the Legislative Assembly of New Brunswick
- Kennebecasis Regional Police Force, a police branch serving the Kennebecasis region.

== Other ==
- Kanabicases Adventurers Society, also known as R.K.A.S., a guild of privateers formed during the late Eighteenth century
