= List of population centres in New Brunswick =

A population centre, in Canadian census data, is a populated place, or a cluster of interrelated populated places, which meets the demographic characteristics of an urban area, having a population of at least 1,000 people and a population density of no fewer than 400 persons per square kilometre.

The term was first introduced in the Canada 2011 Census; prior to that, Statistics Canada used the term urban area.

In the 2021 Census of Population, Statistics Canada listed 31 population centres in the province of New Brunswick.

== List ==
The below table is a list of those population centres in New Brunswick from the 2021 Census of Population as designated, named, and delineated by Statistics Canada.

Rank	Population centre	Size group	Population (2021)	Population (2016)	Change	Land area (km^{2})	Population density
1	Moncton	Large urban	119,785	109,075	+9.8%	110.73	1,081.8/km^{2}
2	Fredericton	Medium	64,614	61,014	+5.9%	89.6	721.1/km^{2}
3	Saint John	Medium	63,447	61,152	+3.8%	70.05	905.7/km^{2}
4	Quispamsis - Rothesay	Small	24,881	24,549	+1.4%	37.05	671.6/km^{2}
5	Bathurst	Small	15,985	15,867	+0.7%	27.92	572.5/km^{2}
6	Edmundston	Small	13,125	12,945	+1.4%	19.06	688.6/km^{2}
7	Chatham - Douglastown	Small	11,594	11,364	+2.0%	27.78	417.4/km^{2}
8	Campbellton	Small	8,833	8,790	+0.5%	17.8	496.2/km^{2}
9	Oromocto	Small	8,585	8,810	−2.6%	10	858.5/km^{2}
10	Shediac	Small	8,563	7,712	+11.0%	14.06	609.0/km^{2}
11	Sussex	Small	5,447	5,308	+2.6%	10.65	511.5/km^{2}
12	Woodstock	Small	4,602	4,332	+6.2%	4.5	1,022.7/km^{2}
13	Tracadie-Sheila	Small	4,528	4,322	+4.8%	9.68	467.8/km^{2}
14	Grand Falls / Grand-Sault	Small	4,349	4,490	−3.1%	7.17	606.6/km^{2}
15	Sackville	Small	3,798	3,053	+24.4%	6	633.0/km^{2}
16	Hampton	Small	3,499	3,436	+1.8%	7.73	452.7/km^{2}
17	St. Stephen	Small	3,389	3,233	+4.8%	3.57	949.3/km^{2}
18	Caraquet	Small	3,190	3,185	+0.2%	7.72	413.2/km^{2}
19	Dalhousie	Small	2,372	2,351	+0.9%	2.56	926.6/km^{2}
20	Starlight Village	Small	2,222	2,193	+1.3%	5.27	421.6/km^{2}
21	Shippagan	Small	2,189	2,130	+2.8%	2.84	770.8/km^{2}
22	New Maryland	Small	2,179	2,219	−1.8%	2.7	807.0/km^{2}
23	Saint-Quentin	Small	2,141	2,194	−2.4%	4.24	505.0/km^{2}
24	Bouctouche	Small	1,944	1,845	+5.4%	4.83	402.5/km^{2}
25	Saint Andrews	Small	1,715	1,511	+13.5%	2.55	672.5/km^{2}
26	Salisbury	Small	1,546	1,534	+0.8%	2.7	572.6/km^{2}
27	Richibucto 15	Small	1,464	1,435	+2.0%	2.52	581.0/km^{2}
28	McEwen	Small	1,445	1,462	−1.2%	0.83	1,741.0/km^{2}
29	Saint-Antoine	Small	1,383	1,353	+2.2%	2.57	538.1/km^{2}
30	Wells	Small	1,263	1,266	−0.2%	2.88	438.5/km^{2}
31	St. Leonard	Small	1,043	1,119	−6.8%	2.01	518.9/km^{2}

== See also ==
- List of the largest population centres in Canada
