= List of census metropolitan areas and agglomerations in New Brunswick =

This is a list of the seven census metropolitan areas and agglomerations in the Canadian province of New Brunswick. As defined by Statistics Canada as of the 2021 census, three entries in the list are identified as a census metropolitan area (CMA) and four as a census agglomeration (CA), with Campbellton's CA containing a portion of Quebec.

== List ==
Rank (2021)	Rank (2016)	Geographic name	Province	Type	Population (2021)	Population (2016)	Change
1	1	Moncton	New Brunswick	CMA	157,717	144,810	+8.91%
2	2	Saint John	New Brunswick	CMA	130,613	126,202	+3.50%
3	3	Fredericton	New Brunswick	CMA	108,610	102,690	+5.76%
4	4	Bathurst	New Brunswick	CA	31,387	31,110	+0.89%
5	5	Miramichi	New Brunswick	CA	27,593	27,518	+0.27%
6	6	Edmundston	New Brunswick	CA	22,144	21,955	+0.86%
7	7	Campbellton (Note: Cambellton's census agglomeration is divided into two parts: one part in New Brunswick, the other in Quebec.)	New Brunswick	CA	13,330	14,679	−9.19%

== See also ==
- List of Canadian census agglomerations by province or territory
- List of census agglomerations in Canada
- List of municipalities in New Brunswick
- List of population centres in New Brunswick
