= New Brunswick School District 06 =

School district in New Brunswick, Canada

School District 06 is a defunct Canadian school district in New Brunswick. It was an Anglophone district operating 27 public schools (gr. K-12) in Kings and part of Queens Counties. In 2012 it was amalgamated into Anglophone South School District. Enrollment was approximately 10,300 students with 650 teachers. District 06 was headquartered in Rothesay.

== List of schools ==
=== High schools ===
- Belleisle Regional
- Hampton High
- Kennebecasis Valley
- Rothesay
- Sussex Regional

=== Middle schools ===
- Hampton
- Harry Miller
- Quispamsis
- Rothesay Park
- Sussex

=== Elementary schools ===
- Apohaqui
- Belleisle
- Dr. A. T. Leatherbarrow
- Fairvale
- Hammond River Valley
- Hampton
- Kennebecasis Park
- Lakefield
- Norton
- Quispamsis
- Rothesay
- Sussex
- Sussex Corner

=== Combined elementary and middle schools ===
- Macdonald Consolidated

=== Private schools ===
- Rothesay Netherwood
- Sussex Christian
- Touchstone Community

=== Other schools ===
- Hampton Middle School Learning Centre
- Partners in Alternative Learning Strategies (Hampton)
- Partners in Alternative Learning Strategies (Sussex)
- PLATO Lab
- Portage N.B. Treatment Centre
