= Saint John Airport =

Airport in Saint John, New Brunswick, Canada

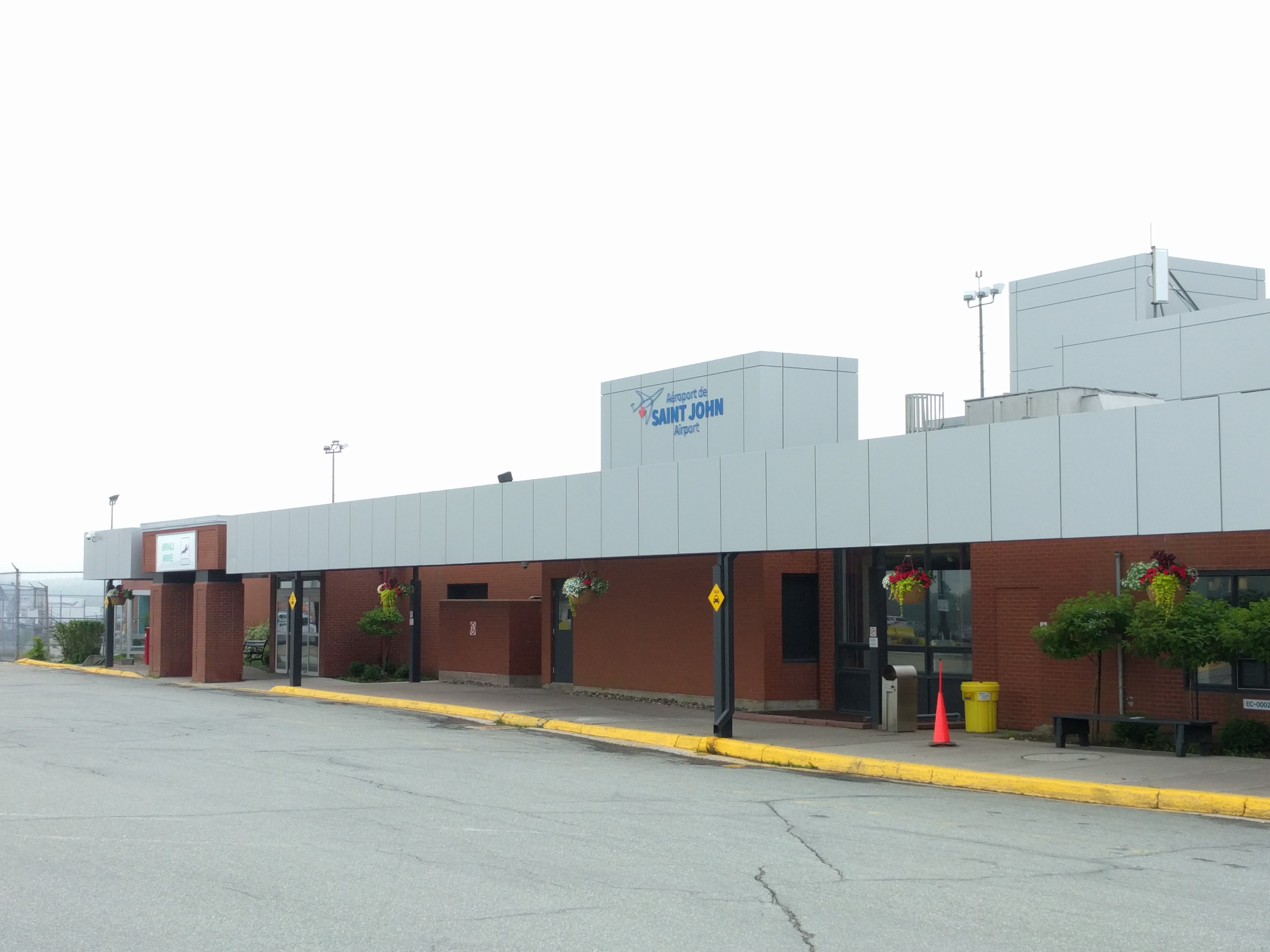
- IATA: YSJ; ICAO: CYSJ; WMO: 71609

Summary
- Airport type: Public
- Owner: Transport Canada
- Operator: Saint John Airport Inc.
- Serves: Saint John, New Brunswick
- Opened: January 8, 1952; 74 years ago
- Time zone: AST (UTC−04:00)
  - Summer (DST): ADT (UTC−03:00)
- Elevation AMSL: 357 ft (109 m)
- Coordinates: 45°18′57″N 065°53′24″W
- Public transit access: Saint John Transit 32
- Website: ysjsaintjohn.ca

Map
- Location in New Brunswick CYSJ (Canada)

Runways
Direction	Length		Surface
Direction	ft	m	Surface
05/23	7,201	2,195	Asphalt
14/32	5,100	1,554	Asphalt

Statistics (2025)
- Aircraft movements: 11,484
- Passengers: 185,150
- Sources: Canada Flight Supplement; Environment Canada; Movements from Statistics Canada; Passengers from Saint John Airport

Saint John Airport (French: Aéroport de Saint-Jean; IATA: YSJ, ICAO: CYSJ) is a Canadian airport in Saint John, New Brunswick. Located about 8 nautical miles (15 km; 9.2 mi) east northeast of Uptown Saint John, in an area formerly known as Clover Valley, the airport serves the city of Saint John, the Greater Saint John metropolitan area, and the southern region of New Brunswick.

The airport, owned by Transport Canada, has been operated by the private non-profit corporation Saint John Airport Inc. since 1999. It is part of the National Airports System. In 2023, the terminal handled 175,000 passengers.

== Overview ==
Saint John Airport was officially opened on January 8, 1952, although several aircraft, including at least one scheduled flight, had already landed at the airport by then. The airport is classified as an airport of entry by Nav Canada and is staffed by the Canada Border Services Agency (CBSA). CBSA officers at this location can handle aircraft with no more than 120 passengers.

Part of the National Airports System, it is owned by Transport Canada and operated by Saint John Airport Inc.

== History ==
=== Background ===
Plans for an airport in Saint John date back to 1928, when in July it was decided that the city would be the site of the province's first municipal airport. At that time, $100,000 was allocated for initial development, which was to occur shortly thereafter. From 1928 to 1951, the Saint John Municipal Airport, located in Millidgeville, served as the city's aviation hub.

By the early 1940s, city councillors recognized the need for a larger airport, evidenced by the increased presence, size, and traffic of aircraft during World War II. They sought help from the provincial government to build a new, larger airport. In 1943, the current airport site underwent an engineering survey, following the creation of a search commission on May 15, 1943. The site, located east of the city, was 719 hectares in size and was purchased by the city on February 26, 1946, for $200,000. In December 1951, the original airport closed, and its land was later used for suburban housing development.

=== Construction and opening ===
In March 1949, construction for the new airport began, although an agreement between the provincial government and the city was not finalized until March 20, 1950. On January 8, 1952, the Saint John Airport officially opened. Located on the eastern side of Loch Lomond Road, the airport was established in an area previously known as Clover Valley, which consisted of farmland and forestry prior to its development. The opening ceremony included preparations for a large air show to take place the following spring. The construction of the airport cost between $5 and $6 million.

== Airlines and destinations ==
=== Passenger ===
Airlines	Destinations
Air Canada Express	Montréal–Trudeau, Toronto–Pearson
Air Canada Rouge	Seasonal: Toronto–Pearson
Flair Airlines	Edmonton (begins June 15, 2027); Seasonal: Toronto–Pearson
Pascan Aviation	Halifax, Montréal–MET

== Accidents and incidents ==
- During 1976, a Douglas C-49J C-FHPM of Atlantic Central Airlines was reported to have been damaged beyond economic repair at Saint John Airport.

== Bibliography ==
- Goss, David (2013). Historic Saint John Streets. Halifax, N.S.: Nimbus Publishing. p. 180. ISBN 978-1-77108-014-9.
- McGrath, T. M. (1992). History of Canadian Airports. Toronto: Lugus Publications in co-operation with Transport Canada and the Canadian Government Publishing Centre. p. 333. ISBN 978-0-921633-11-2.
