= 2016 Telus Cup =

Tournament details
- Venue(s): qplex in Quispamsis, NB
- Dates: April 18 – 24, 2016
- Teams: 6

Final positions
- Champions: North York Rangers
- Runners-up: Saint John Vitos
- Third place: Lions du Lac St-Louis

Tournament statistics
- Scoring leader: Matthias Laferrière

Awards
- MVP: Matthias Laferrière

The 2016 Telus Cup was Canada's 38th annual national midget 'AAA' hockey championship, played April 18 – 24, 2016 at Quispamsis, New Brunswick. The North York Rangers defeated the host Saint John Vitos in the gold medal game, while the Lions du Lac du St-Louis won the bronze.

== Teams ==
Result	Team	Region	City
1st place, gold medalist(s)	North York Rangers	Central	Toronto, Ontario
2nd place, silver medalist(s)	Saint John Vitos	Host	Saint John, New Brunswick
3rd place, bronze medalist(s)	Lions du Lac St-Louis	Quebec	Dollard-des-Ormeaux, Quebec
4	Lloydminster Bobcats	Pacific	Lloydminster, Alberta
5	Dartmouth Major Midgets	Atlantic	Halifax, Nova Scotia
6	Saskatoon Contacts	West	Saskatoon, Saskatchewan

== Round robin ==
Pos	Team	Pld	W	L	D	GF	GA	GD	Pts
1	Lions du Lac St-Louis	5	5	0	0	22	6	+16	10
2	Lloydminster Bobcats	5	3	1	1	18	14	+4	7
3	North York Rangers	5	3	2	0	15	12	+3	6
4	Saint John Vitos	5	2	2	1	17	19	−2	5
5	Dartmouth Major Midgets	5	1	4	0	20	24	−4	2
6	Saskatoon Contacts	5	0	5	0	11	28	−17	0

Tiebreaker: Head-to-head record, most wins, highest goal differential.

Schedule and Results
Game	Away team	Score	Home team	Score	Notes	Date
1	Saskatoon	0	North York	5	Final	April 18
2	Lac St-Louis	3	Lloydminster	2	Final	April 18
3	Dartmouth	2	Saint John	5	Final	April 18
4	Saskatoon	0	Lac St-Louis	4	Final	April 19
5	North York	5	Dartmouth	3	Final	April 19
6	Saint John	3	Lloydminster	3	Final	April 19
7	Dartmouth	3	Lac St-Louis	7	Final	April 20
8	Lloydminster	4	Saskatoon	3	Final	April 20
9	North York	3	Saint John	2	Final	April 20
10	Lloydminster	5	Dartmouth	3	Final	April 21
11	Lac St-Louis	3	North York	1	Final	April 21
12	Saint John	7	Saskatoon	6	Final	April 21
13	North York	1	Lloydminster	4	Final	April 22
14	Saskatoon	2	Dartmouth	8	Final	April 22
15	Saint John	0	Lac St-Louis	5	Final	April 22

== Playoffs ==
Game	Away team	Score	Home team	Score	Notes	Date
Semi 1	North York	5	Lloydminster	3	Final	April 23
Semi 2	Saint John	2	Lac St-Louis	1	Final	April 23
Bronze	Lloydminster	2	Lac St-Louis	6	Final	April 24
Gold	Saint John	1	North York	4	Final	April 24

== Individual awards ==
- Most Valuable Player: Matthias Laferrière (Lac St-Louis)
- Top Scorer: Matthias Laferrière (Lac St-Louis)
- Top Forward: Adam Capannelli (Lac St-Louis)
- Top Defensive Player: Ty Smith (Lloydminster)
- Top Goaltender: Sandro Silvestre (Lac St-Louis)
- Most Sportsmanlike Player: Ty Gitzel (Saskatoon)
- Esso Scholarship: Ryan Porter (Dartmouth)

== Road to the Telus Cup ==
=== Atlantic Region ===
Saint John Vitos won regional tournament held March 27 to April 3, 2016 at Conception Bay South, Newfoundland and Labrador. As Saint John already qualified as the host team, the runner-up Dartmouth Major Midgets also advanced to the Telus Cup.

Round Robin
Pos	Qualification	Team	Pld	W	L	D	GF	GA	GD	Pts
1	NSMMHL	Dartmouth Major Midgets	4	3	0	1	16	6	+10	7
2	NBPEIMMHL	Saint John Vitos	4	2	1	1	13	9	+4	5
3	NBPEIMMHL	Kensington Wild	4	2	2	0	13	9	+4	4
4	NLMMHL	St. John's Maple Leafs	4	1	3	0	7	12	−5	2
5	Host	St. John's Privateers	4	1	3	0	9	22	−13	2

Championship Game
Away team	Score	Home team	Score
Saint John Vitos	2	Dartmouth Major Midgets	1

=== Québec ===
The Lions du Lac St-Louis advanced to the Telus Cup by winning the Quebec Midget AAA Hockey League championship series.

Best-of-7 series
Pos	Team	Pld	W	L	GF	GA	GD
1	Lions du Lac St-Louis	6	4	2	17	15	+2
2	Cantonniers de Magog	6	2	4	15	17	−2

=== Central Region ===
The North York Rangers advanced to the Telus Cup by winning regional tournament held March 27 to April 3, 2016 at Waterloo, Ontario.

Round Robin
Pos	Qualification	Team	Pld	W	L	D	GF	GA	GD	Pts
1	GTHL	North York Rangers	5	4	1	0	23	16	+7	8
2	OMHA	Whitby Wildcats	5	4	1	0	19	11	+8	8
3	Alliance	London Jr. Knights	5	2	2	1	20	18	+2	5
4	HEO	Kanata Lasers	5	2	3	0	11	15	−4	4
5	GNML	Sudbury Nickel Capital Wolves	5	1	3	1	12	19	−7	3
6	Host	Waterloo Wolves	5	1	4	0	18	24	−6	2

Playoff Round
Game	Away team	Score	Home team	Score
SF 1	Kanata	1	North York	3
SF 2	London	1	Whitby	4
Final	Whitby	0	North York	4

=== West Region ===
The Saskatoon Contacts advanced to the Telus Cup by winning regional tournament held March 31 to April 2, 2016 at the Rod Hamm Memorial Arena in Saskatoon, Saskatchewan.

Round Robin
Pos	Qualification	Team	Pld	W	L	D	GF	GA	GD	Pts
1	MMAAAHL	Winnipeg Wild	3	2	0	1	10	7	+3	5
2	Host	Saskatoon Contacts	3	2	1	0	13	6	+7	4
3	HNO	Kenora Thistles	3	1	1	1	11	14	−3	3
4	SMAAAHL	Notre Dame Hounds	3	0	3	0	4	11	−7	0

Championship Game
Away team	Score	Home team	Score
Winnipeg Wild	3	Saskatoon Contacts	4

=== Pacific Region ===
The Lloydminster Bobcats advanced to the Telus Cup by winning regional best-of-three series held April 1 to 3, 2016 at Lloydminster, Saskatchewan.

Best-of-3 series
Pos	Qualification	Team	Pld	W	L	GF	GA	GD
1	AMHL	Lloydminster Bobcats	2	2	0	9	4	+5
2	BCMMHL	Valley West Hawks	2	0	2	4	9	−5

== See also ==
- Telus Cup
