= 2018 World U-17 Hockey Challenge =

Tournament details
- Host country: Canada
- Venues: 2 (in 2 host cities)
- Dates: November 3 – November 10
- Teams: 8

The 2018 World Under-17 Hockey Challenge was an ice hockey tournament that was held in Quispamsis and Saint John, New Brunswick, Canada from November 3 and 10. The World Under-17 Hockey Challenge is held by Hockey Canada annually to showcase young hockey talent from Canada and other strong hockey countries.

The round-robin and knockout games were hosted at Qplex in Quispamsis and Harbour Station in Saint John, and the latter hosted the bronze and gold medal games.

== Challenge results ==
=== Preliminary round ===
Games for Group A were played at TD Station in Saint John, and games for Group B were played at Qplex in Quispamsis.

==== Group A ====
Team	Pld	W	OTW	OTL	L	GF	GA	GD	Pts
Canada White	3	2	1	0	0	15	7	+8	8
Canada Black	3	1	1	1	0	12	11	+1	6
United States	3	1	0	0	2	11	11	0	3
Czech Republic	3	0	0	1	2	4	13	−9	1

===== Results =====
4 November 2018	United States	5–1	Czech Republic	Harbour Station, Saint John

4 November 2018	Canada Black	4–5 OT	Canada White	Harbour Station, Saint John

5 November 2018	Czech Republic	2–3 OT	Canada Black	Harbour Station, Saint John

5 November 2018	Canada White	5–2	United States	Harbour Station, Saint John

6 November 2018	United States	4–5	Canada Black	Harbour Station, Saint John

6 November 2018	Czech Republic	1–5	Canada White	Harbour Station, Saint John

==== Group B ====
Team	Pld	W	OTW	OTL	L	GF	GA	GD	Pts
Russia	3	2	0	0	1	8	4	+4	6
Canada Red	3	0	2	0	1	10	10	0	4
Sweden	3	1	0	1	1	9	8	+1	4
Finland	3	1	0	1	1	6	11	−5	4

===== Results =====
3 November 2018	Finland	1–6	Sweden	qplex, Quispamsis

3 November 2018	Canada Red	2–4	Russia	qplex, Quispamsis

5 November 2018	Russia	1–2	Finland	qplex, Quispamsis

5 November 2018	Sweden	3–4 OT	Canada Red	qplex, Quispamsis

6 November 2018	Russia	3–0	Sweden	qplex, Quispamsis

6 November 2018	Finland	3–4 OT	Canada Red	qplex, Quispamsis

=== Play Offs ===
Quarterfinals
8 November
Canada White	3
Finland	4 SO
8 November
Canada Red	2 OT
United States	1
8 November
Russia	5
Czech Republic	0
8 November
Canada Black	2
Sweden	4

Semifinals
9 November
Finland	5
Canada Red	2
9 November
Russia	6
Sweden	4

Final
10 November
Finland	1
Russia	2
Third place
10 November
Canada Red	3
Sweden	4 SO

== Final standings ==
	Team
1st place, gold medalist(s)	Russia
2nd place, silver medalist(s)	Finland
3rd place, bronze medalist(s)	Sweden
4	Canada Red
5	Canada Black
6	Canada White
7	Czech Republic
8	United States
