= Fairvale =

Fairvale may refer to:

- Fairvale High School, Fairfield West, Sydney, Australia
- Fairvale, New Brunswick, Canada, an incorporated village
- Fairvale, California, a fictional place near Bates Motel in the Alfred Hitchcock film Psycho and related works
