= YSJ =

YSJ may refer to:

- York St John University
- Saint John Airport (IATA airport code)
- Yoo Seung-jun (born 1976), South Korean singer
