= Rothesay Park School =

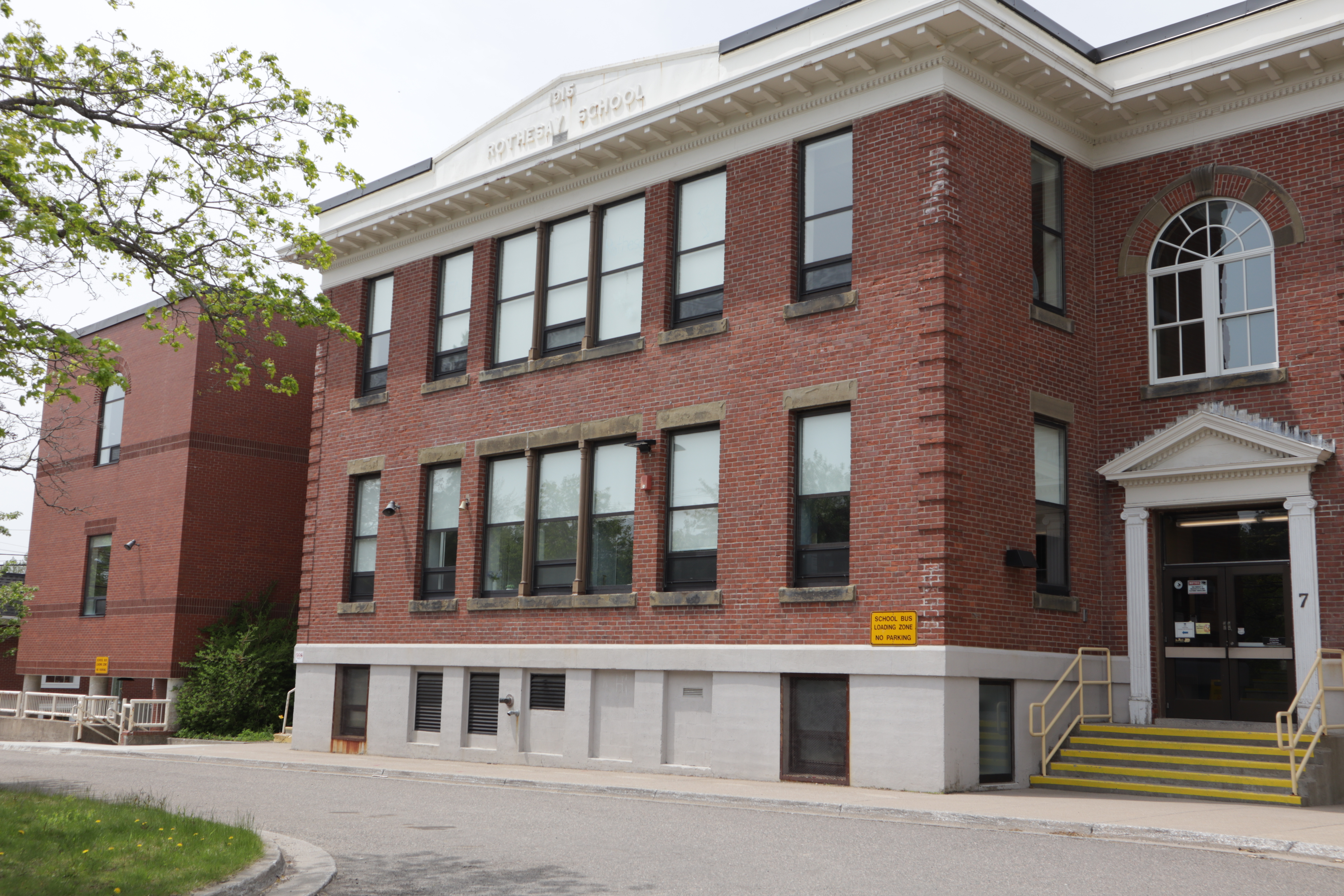

Location
- 7 Hampton Road; Rothesay, NB, E2E 5K8; Canada; 45.3879°N 65.9964°W

Information
- School type: Public
- Motto: Stand Tall, Fly High
- Founded: 1915
- School board: Anglophone South
- Superintendent: Zoe Wattson
- Principal: Tammy Derrah
- Grades: 6 to 8
- Enrollment: 265 (2011)
- Language: English, French immersion
- Area: Rothesay
- Colours: Red, blue and gold
- Mascot: Ralph the Raven
- Team name: Ravens
- Alumni: Jack Long
- Website: rothesaypark.nbed.nb.ca

Rothesay Park School is a middle school situated in Rothesay, New Brunswick, Canada. The school serves about 300 students in grades 6 to 8. It was previously a part of New Brunswick School District 06.

== History ==
The school was founded in the late 19th century. It moved into a purpose brick built building, the first in the area, in 1915 when it was known as Rothesay Consolidated School and educated in grades 1–12. After the opening of a new high school in the 1950s it was renamed as Rothesay Elementary School and restricted to grades 1–6. However this school closed in 1975 and a new Rothesay Elementary School opened nearby. Community pressure resisted the demolition of the building which re-opened in 1977 as Rothesay Park Elementary School. A further reorganisation occurred in 1997 when it became a grade 6-8 middle school, now called Rothesay Park School.

== Recognition ==
Heritage Canada recognized the re-opening project with a Regional Award of Honour for Heritage Preservation in 1997. During the 2005–2006 school year it was voted, by Today's Parent Magazine, one of the top 100 schools in Canada.
