= Quispamsis =

- Town
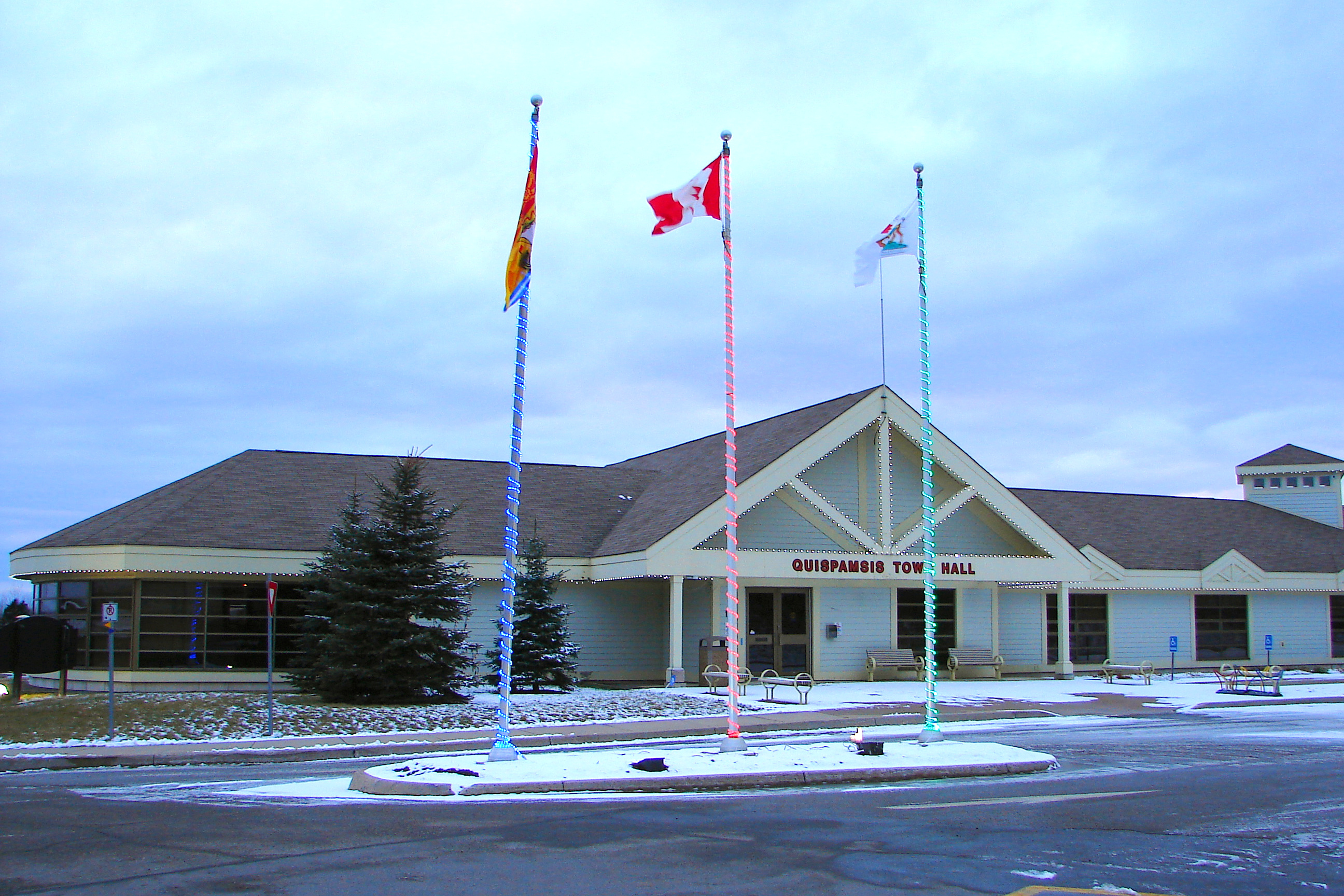
- Quispamsis Town Hall

- Flag Seal Coat of arms
- Nickname: Quispam
- Motto: "Quispamsis Floreat" (Latin) "Quispamsis Flourish"
- Location within New Brunswick
- Coordinates: 45.43216°N 65.94621°W
- Country: Canada
- Province: New Brunswick
- County: Kings County
- Parish: Rothesay Parish
- First settled: c. 1783
- Incorporated (village): 1966
- Incorporated (town): December 22, 1982
- Electoral Districts Federal: Saint John-Kennebecasis
- Provincial: Quispamsis

Government
  - Type: Town Council
  - Mayor: Mary Schryer
  - Councillors: List of Members: Mike Biggar; Noah Donovan; Kerrie Luck; Doug MacDonald; Kirk Miller; Emil T. Olsen; Beth Thompson
  - MP: Wayne Long (LPC)
  - MLA: Aaron Kennedy (Lib)

Area
  - Land: 56.97 km^{2} (22.00 sq mi)

Population (2021)
  - Total: 18,768
  - Density: 329.4/km^{2} (853/sq mi)
- Demonym(s): Quispammer, Pammer
- Time zone: UTC-4 (AST)
  - Summer (DST): UTC-3 (ADT)
- Canadian postal code: E2E, E2G, E2S
- Area code: 506
- Telephone Exchanges: 847, 848, 849
- NTS Map: 021H05
- GNBC Code: DAVTW
- Website: quispamsis.ca

Quispamsis (/kwɪs.pæm.sɪs/, (Note: The name is traditionally pronounced with a weak stress on any syllable, on the first and the third syllables, or on all syllables; the pronunciation with a strong stress on the second syllable is a recent development and is found mostly in those who have never visited the town.) sometimes shortened to Quispam /kwɪsˈpæm/) is a suburban town located in Kings County, New Brunswick, Canada. Located within Saint John's metropolitan area, it borders the town of Rothesay to form the Kennebecasis Valley and is located along the lower Kennebecasis River. As of 2021, the population of Quispamsis was 18,768.

== History ==
The region was initially inhabited by the Wolastoqiyik First Nation, who were members of the Wabanaki Confederacy. The name "Quispamsis" was derived from the Wolastoqey language, signifying "little lake in the woods," possibly referring specifically to the present-day Ritchie Lake. Around 1783, Acadians, British pre-Loyalists and Loyalists settled in the area, with many individuals receiving land grants along the Kennebecasis and Hammond Rivers.

In December 1982, Quispamsis' application for town status was accepted by the province; it was New Brunswick's largest village at the time.

=== Amalgamation ===
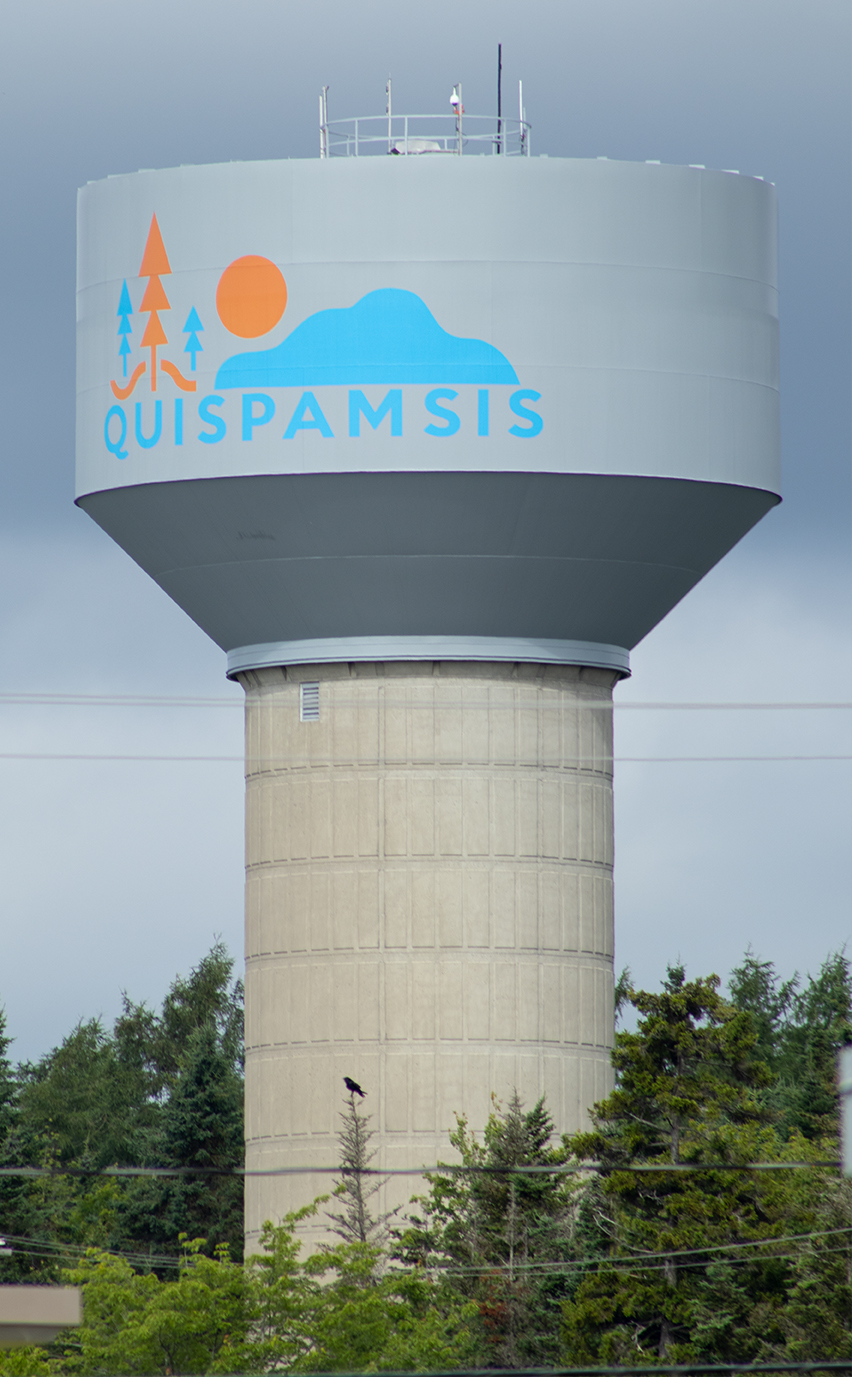
Quispamsis water tower

Following the December 1992 release of a government discussion paper entitled "Strengthening Municipal Government in New Brunswick's Urban Centres", a series of localized feasibility studies were commissioned by the Frank McKenna's Liberals targeting six geographic areas: Edmunston, Campbellton, Dalhousie, Miramichi, Moncton, and Saint John. In each instance, a panel composed of local representatives and expert consulting staff made specific recommendations for each urban-centred region. The report for the Greater Saint John area, "A Community of Communities: Creating a stronger future" - often referred to simply as the Cormier Report - offered two potential solutions to the Province for consolidating the many municipalities in Greater Saint John, neither of which was ultimately adopted by government.

Option one offered by the Cormier Report was to create three communities with regionalization of some services. Under this option, the six Kennebecasis Valley communities (East Riverside-Kinghurst, Fairvale, Gondola Point, Quispamsis, Renforth, and Rothesay) plus the local service district of the Parish of Rothesay would be consolidated into one new municipality. The Town of Grand Bay and various unincorporated areas around Saint John would also be consolidated into the City of Saint John to form the second new municipality. The third municipality in this scenario would be Westfield, which would remain separate because it was more rural and less populated. In this scenario, many services including water and sewerage, planning, and economic development would be regionalized across the three municipalities.

The second option offered by Cormier was a full consolidation of eight of the existing communities into one new city. In this scenario, only Westfield would remain a separate municipality. Full consolidation was unpopular among residents outside the City of Saint John. Suburban residents stated generally that they were pleased with their communities as they were and that they liked their lower tax rates. As Cormier summarized it, residents "perceive Saint John as an expensive, poorly managed bureaucracy that does not serve its citizens well. They fear loss of control, loss of services, and loss of neighbourhood friendliness and sense of community."

Ultimately, neither of the two options was implemented. Rather, the provincial government chose to proceed with partial consolidations and opted to legislate cost sharing for five specific regional facilities. Quispamsis amalgamated on January 1, 1998 with the nearby communities of Gondola Point and Wells to form the present town, covering an area of 60 km^{2} and bordering the town of Rothesay to the southwest with the Hammond River along its northeastern boundary.

Occasional discussion about the possibility of further amalgamating Rothesay with Quispamsis has not proceeded beyond the discussion phase, though the two municipalities do collaborate extensively to share services and facilities. Notably, both towns' boundaries were also left largely unaltered by the 2023 New Brunswick local governance reform.

== Demographics ==
In the 2021 Census of Population conducted by Statistics Canada, Quispamsis had a population of 18,768 living in 6,855 of its 6,985 total private dwellings, a change of 2.9% from its 2016 population of 18,245. With a land area of 56.97 km^{2} (22.00 sq mi), it had a population density of 329.4/km^{2} (853.2/sq mi) in 2021.

Historical population

| Year | Pop. | ±% |
|---|---|---|
| 1981 | 6,022 | — |
| 1986 | 7,185 | +19.3% |
| 1991 | 8,446 | +17.6% |
| 1996 | 8,839 | +4.7% |

| Year | Pop. | ±% |
|---|---|---|
| 2001 | 13,757 | +55.6% |
| 2006 | 15,239 | +10.8% |
| 2011 | 17,886 | +17.4% |
| 2016 | 18,245 | +2.0% |

Source: Statistic Canada

Panethnic groups in the Town of Quispamsis (2001−2021)
| Panethnic group | 2021 | | 2016 | | 2011 | | 2006 | | 2001 | |
| Panethnic group | Pop. | % | Pop. | % | Pop. | % | Pop. | % | Pop. | % |
|---|---|---|---|---|---|---|---|---|---|---|
| European (Note: Statistic includes all persons that did not make up part of a visible minority or an indigenous identity.) | 17,170 | 92.94% | 17,095 | 95.21% | 16,780 | 95.07% | 14,980 | 98.29% | 13,455 | 97.85% |
| East Asian (Note: Statistic includes total responses of "Chinese", "Korean", and "Japanese" under visible minority section on census.) | 490 | 2.65% | 315 | 1.75% | 305 | 1.73% | 40 | 0.26% | 40 | 0.29% |
| Indigenous | 275 | 1.49% | 240 | 1.34% | 195 | 1.1% | 45 | 0.3% | 70 | 0.51% |
| African | 230 | 1.24% | 150 | 0.84% | 170 | 0.96% | 45 | 0.3% | 95 | 0.69% |
| South Asian | 125 | 0.68% | 50 | 0.28% | 90 | 0.51% | 55 | 0.36% | 45 | 0.33% |
| Southeast Asian (Note: Statistic includes total responses of "Filipino" and "Southeast Asian" under visible minority section on census.) | 75 | 0.41% | 20 | 0.11% | 30 | 0.17% | 20 | 0.13% | 0 | 0% |
| Latin American | 30 | 0.16% | 20 | 0.11% | 40 | 0.23% | 50 | 0.33% | 30 | 0.22% |
| Middle Eastern (Note: Statistic includes total responses of "West Asian" and "Arab" under visible minority section on census.) | 10 | 0.05% | 45 | 0.25% | 50 | 0.28% | 10 | 0.07% | 20 | 0.15% |
| Other/multiracial (Note: Statistic includes total responses of "Visible minority, n.i.e." and "Multiple visible minorities" under visible minority section on census.) | 75 | 0.41% | 35 | 0.19% | 0 | 0% | 0 | 0% | 20 | 0.15% |
| Total responses | 18,475 | 98.44% | 17,955 | 98.41% | 17,650 | 98.38% | 15,240 | 100.01% | 13,750 | 99.95% |
| Total population | 18,768 | 100% | 18,245 | 100% | 17,941 | 100% | 15,239 | 100% | 13,757 | 100% |
Note: Totals greater than 100% due to multiple origin responses

== Parks ==
There are a number of recreational parks in the area. Parks open at dawn and closed at dusk. Parks include:

Arts and Culture Park (12 Landing Court) – includes walking trails, WiFi, picnic/chess tables, benches, stage and mezzanine. During the summer months there are outdoor movies and music free of charge and ice skating during the winter months.

Hammond River Park (28 Reynar Drive) – includes 40 acres, a fire pit, barbecue, picnic tables, hiking trails and a log cabin which is available for rent.

Homestar Off Leash Dog Park (222 Vincent Road) – fenced-in area, trails and benches. Dogs are allowed off-leash.

Meenan's Cove Park (199 Model Farm Road) – includes picnic tables, barbecues, beach, boat dock, playground, ball field, walking trails and beach volleyball courts.

Ritchie Lake Park (Cedar Grove Drive) – includes picnic tables, beach and walking trails.

Qplex (20 Randy Jones Way) - includes two soccer fields, a baseball field, tennis courts, an arena, a swimming pool and a playground as well as many varied walking trails.

Gondola Point Beach - Gondola Point Beach is a supervised freshwater beach with changing rooms and picnic areas. It is situated on a sandbar overlooking the Kennebecasis River at the entrance to the Gondola Point Cable Ferry service in Quispamsis. A section of the beach is fenced off to allow dogs off-leash.

== Transport ==
The Gondola Point Ferry, linking Quispamsis with the Kingston Peninsula, was originally installed by William Pitt and is the first underwater cable ferry in the world.

The COMEX bus service run by Saint John Transit runs through the Kennebecasis Valley and shuttles commuters from Quispamsis to Saint John every day, Mondays to Fridays. There are a few "park and ride" locations for commuters to leave their car for the day to take the bus into Saint John and along with other standing bus stops along the way.

== Education ==
Quispamsis has a number of schools from grades K-12, these schools are:

| School | Grades |
|---|---|
| Quispamsis Elementary School | K-5 |
| Lakefield Elementary School | K-5 |
| Chris Saunders Memorial Elementary School | K-5 |
| École des Pionniers | K-5 |
| Origins Academy | K-5 |
| Valley Christian Academy | K-12 |
| Quispamsis Middle School | 6-8 |
| Kennebecasis Valley High School | 9-12 |

== Notable people ==
- Tricia Black - actress known for Pretty Hard Cases and an alumna of The Second City
- Blaine Higgs - Politician and 34th Premier of New Brunswick
- Randy Jones - Former professional ice hockey player who played eight seasons in the National Hockey League (NHL) with the Philadelphia Flyers, Los Angeles Kings, Tampa Bay Lightning and Winnipeg Jets.

== See also ==
- List of communities in New Brunswick
