= William Pitt (engineer) =

Captain William Pitt
- Born: 29 November 1841
- Died: 12 September 1909 (aged 67)
- Cause of death: injuries after falling into machinery of his ferry
- Occupation: ferryman
- Known for: operated a small sail and oars scow ferry in New Brunswick
- Notable work: inventor of the underwater cable ferry

Captain William Abraham Pitt (29 November 1841 – 12 September 1909) was a Canadian ferryman from the Kingston Peninsula of New Brunswick. He was from Reed's Point, Kings County, New Brunswick, and for over thirty years he operated a small sail and oars scow ferry connecting the Kingston Peninsula with the Kennebecasis Valley.

Pitt was the inventor of the underwater cable ferry. His new invention was installed across the Kennebecasis River between Reed's Point and Gondola Point in 1903. Believing that the cable required to operate his new ferry was too heavy and bulky, Pitt decided to lay the cable out during the winter. He ran the ferry cable across the river allowing it to sink into place with the spring thaw. By the middle of the 20th century, New Brunswick's road network improved and cable ferries built to carry passengers and vehicles could be found in many river communities.

Pitt later died from serious injuries after falling into the machinery of his ferry. One of the two cable ferries currently operating at Gondola Point is named the "William Pitt II" in his honour.
