= Paris Crew =

Canadian rowing team

The Paris Crew

The Paris Crew is the name given to a quartet of Canadian sport rowers from Saint John, New Brunswick.

Robert Fulton, George Price, Samuel Hutton, and Elijah Ross, along with reserve oarsman James Price, became Canada's first-ever international sporting champions when they defeated the London Rowing Club to win the World Rowing Championship at the 1867 Paris International Exposition in Paris, France.

Seen as little more than "country bumpkins," Elijah Ross worked as a lighthouse keeper and the others were fishermen. Rowing without a coxswain and with their very unorthodox style and antiquated equipment, the Canadian team had been given no chance at all against their slick European competitors. Their World championship win on the Seine River against four of the top oarsmen from Oxford University, who had been selected from the team that earlier in the year had beaten Cambridge University in The Boat Race, was a shocking upset that made sporting headlines everywhere and the team national heroes.

In 1868, the Paris Crew traveled to Springfield, Massachusetts, where they defeated the vaunted Republican crew to win the Championship of America. Over the next two years they repeatedly beat the American challengers and captured numerous provincial and international titles. At an international competition in Lachine, Quebec, in September 1870 they lost to a British team from Newcastle upon Tyne. In a rematch the following August on the Kennebecasis River, the Paris Crew claimed victory after James Renforth collapsed in the British boat during the race and died from apparent heart failure. The village where the race took place was renamed Renforth, New Brunswick, in his memory.

The Paris Crew raced successfully until disbanding in 1876. Their accomplishments were recognized with their posthumous induction into Canada's Sports Hall of Fame in 1956 and the New Brunswick Sports Hall of Fame in 1972.

== Members ==
Samuel Hutton (July 10, 1845 – August 21, 1894) was an Irish-born Canadian fisherman and boat builder from Saint John. On May 26, 1880, Hutton survived being stabbed by fellow fisherman William Belyea after they had an argument. Hutton drowned on August 21, 1894, when his yacht capsized around Partridge Island during a race.

Robert Fulton died in his Saint John home on February 22, 1906, at the age of 61. George Price died in his Saint John home on the evening of March 26, 1909. Elijah Ross, the last surviving member, died on November 27, 1920, at the age of 75.
