= Rothesay station =

Railway station in New Brunswick, Canada

Coordinates: 45°23′22″N 65°59′57″W

Rothesay
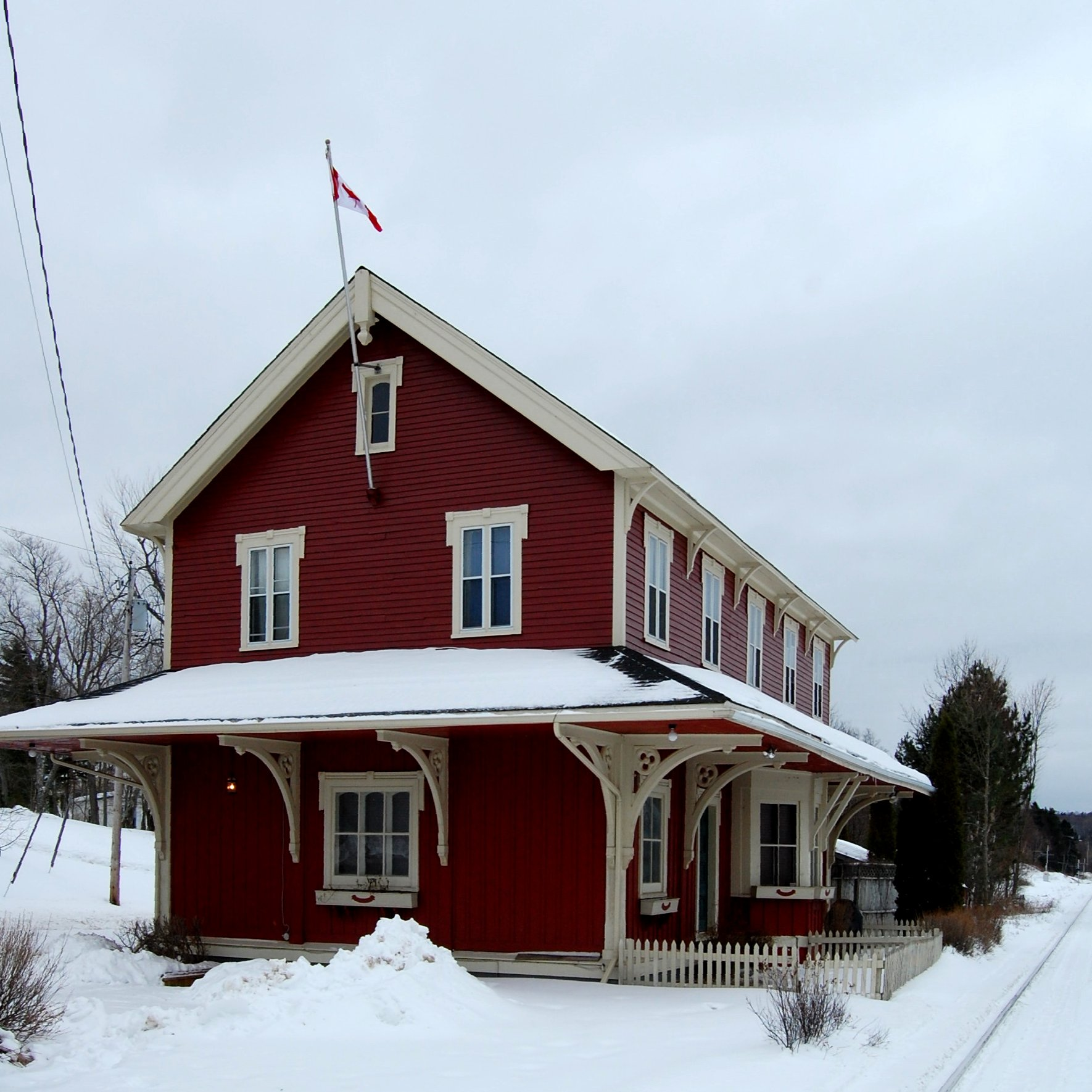
- Rothesay station in December 2007

General information
- Location: Rothesay, New Brunswick; Canada
- System: Historic railway station

History
- Opened: 1860
- Closed: 1975

National Historic Site of Canada
- Official name: Rothesay Railway Station (European and North American) National Historic Site of Canada
- Designated: 1976
Location

The Rothesay station is one of the oldest standing railway stations in Canada, built between 1858 and 1860. It is a National Historic Site of Canada located in Rothesay, New Brunswick. The building offers an example of the standard station design of its era with its wooden two storey configuration.

== History ==
The Rothesay Station was erected during construction of the European and North American Railway which connected Saint John to Shediac, New Brunswick (Pointe-du-Chêne) and was completed in August 1860. The station was originally Kennebecasis Station but was renamed in honour of the visit of the Prince of Wales (Rothesay being one of his titles).

The station was closed in 1975, but the Atlantic still ran as late as 1994. In 1976, the Rothesay Area Heritage Trust was formed to acquire and preserve the structure and continues to manage it today. The tracks are still in use, as Canadian National Railways operate them as a secondary mainline.
