= Qplex =

Sporting facility in Quispamsis, New Brunswick

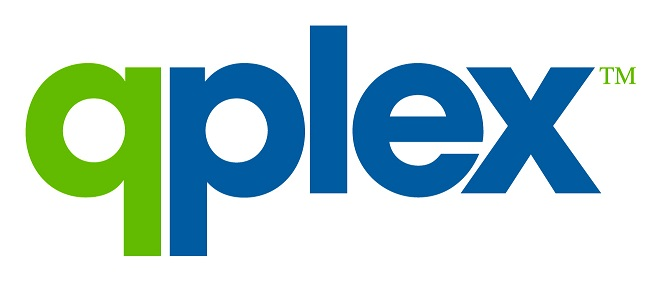

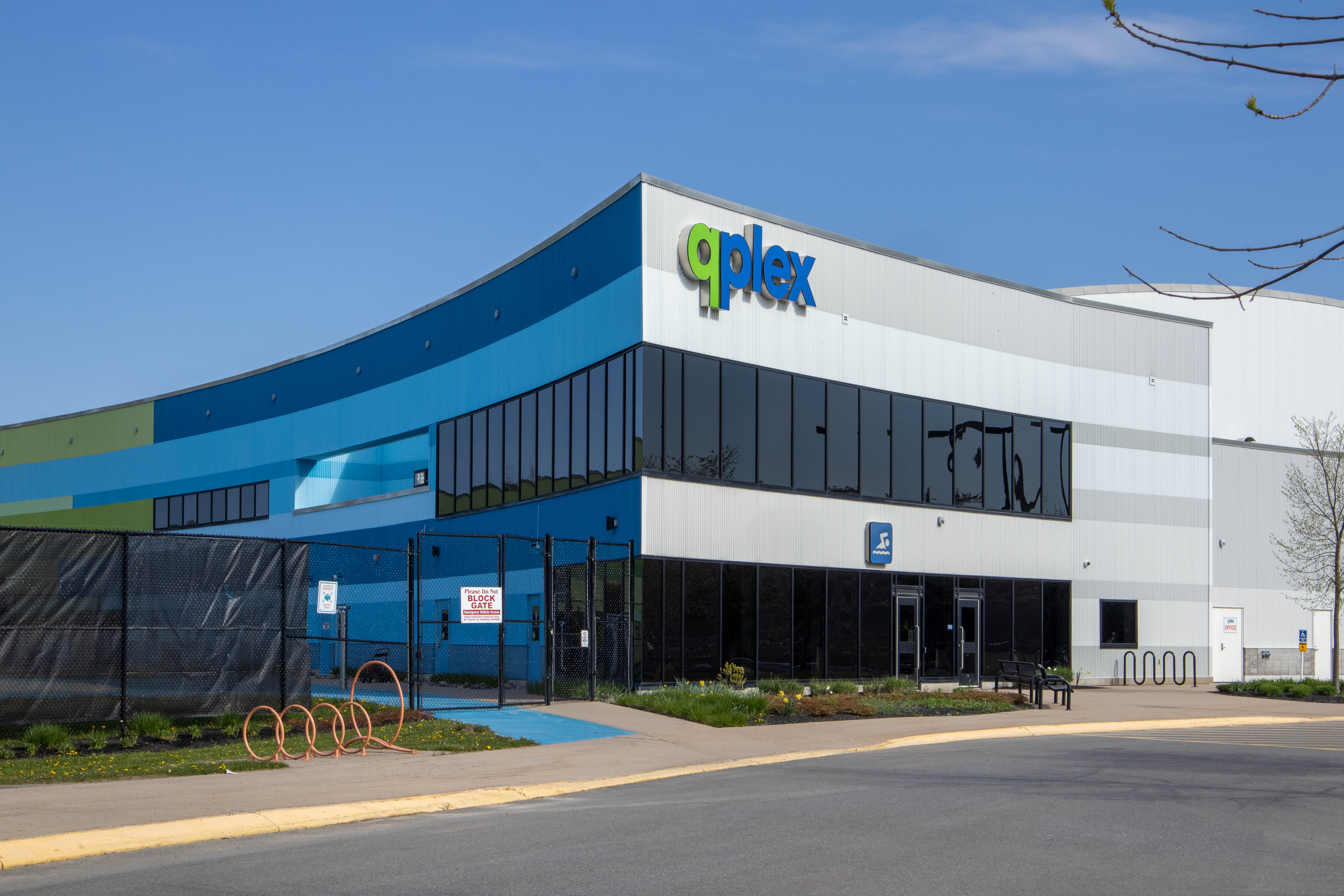
- Qplex in May 2024

- Location within New Brunswick
- Location: 20 Randy Jones Way; Quispamsis, New Brunswick; E2E 0B3
- Coordinates: 45.441°N 65.975°W
- Designation: LEED Gold

Construction
- Opened: April 31, 2011; 15 years ago
- Years active: 2011–present
- Cost: $24.5 million
- Architects: Murdock & Boyd Architects
- General contractor: Marco Maritimes Limited

The Qplex (stylized as "qplex") is a Canadian sporting and recreational facility in Quispamsis, New Brunswick.

== Description ==
The Qplex was one of the first Canadian facilities to receive a LEED Gold certification. It uses the roof to harvest rainwater which is then used for flushing its toilets, as well as geothermal energy for heating the indoor building as well as the outdoor swimming pool. The facility has been described as the "crown jewel" of the town, and was built at a cost of $24.5 million.

The road on which the Qplex is located, Randy Jones Way, is named after former National Hockey League player Randy Jones, who is originally from Quispamsis. The ground floor of the facility contains a small hockey equipment store.

== History ==
Initial planning and proposals for the Qplex began in 2007; at this time, the facility was to have an ice rink as well as a swimming pool. During this early planning stage, the name "QPlace" was also proposed. An architectural rendering of the building was proposed in early 2008, with the facility planning to have a focus on efficient energy use and a "green design." The town further pursued plans for the establishment of the Qplex in mid-2008. On June 2, 2009, the council of Quispamsis awarded the construction contract to Marco Maritimes Limited. The architect chosen for the project was Stephen Kopp of Murdock & Boyd Architects.

The Qplex was officially opened on March 31, 2011. In order to celebrate the opening, it held the Irving Oil Challenge Cup, which was well-received aside from the overflow of parking at the time. The facility opened its swimming pool, namely the 97.3 The Wave Pool due to its sponsorship with radio station CHWV-FM, for the first time on June 6, 2011.

The Qplex has been used to host sporting events such as the 2016 Telus Cup, the 2018 World U-17 Hockey Challenge, practices for the 2019 Canadian Figure Skating Championships, as well as the 2023 Para Hockey Cup. It has also been used to hold several community events, including Remembrance Day ceremonies.
