= Kennebecasis Regional Police Force =

Agency overview
- Formed: 1951 (Rothesay Police Department); 1984 (Rothesay Regional Police Force); 2014 (Kennebecasis Regional Police Force)

Jurisdictional structure
- Legal jurisdiction: Regional

Operational structure
- Headquarters: 126 Millennium Drive, Quispamsis, New Brunswick E2E 6E6
- Sworn members: 46
- Unsworn members: 15
- Elected officer responsible: The Honourable Hon. Robert McKee, K.C., Minister of Public Safety and Solicitor General
- Agency executive: Mike Young, Chief of Police

Facilities
- Stations: 1

Website
- Official website

The Kennebecasis Regional Police Force (KRPF) is the police force responsible for towns of Rothesay and Quispamsis in the province of New Brunswick, Canada. The 46-person force is currently headed by Chief of Police Mike Young with the support of four auxiliary members and five civilian staff members.

The force was originally created in 1951 as the Rothesay Police Department with only one police officer. The department eventually expanded in 1984 to six neighbouring communities and the RRPF was established. The seven communities amalgamated in 1998 into two towns which is the basis of existence of the current KRPF.

The force currently operates with five sections - general investigations, firearms, traffic, identification and court. Additionally, there are victim services unit, a dispatch centre and a public relations department. The force also operates three community policing offices that are run by volunteers.
