= Kennebecasis Valley High School =

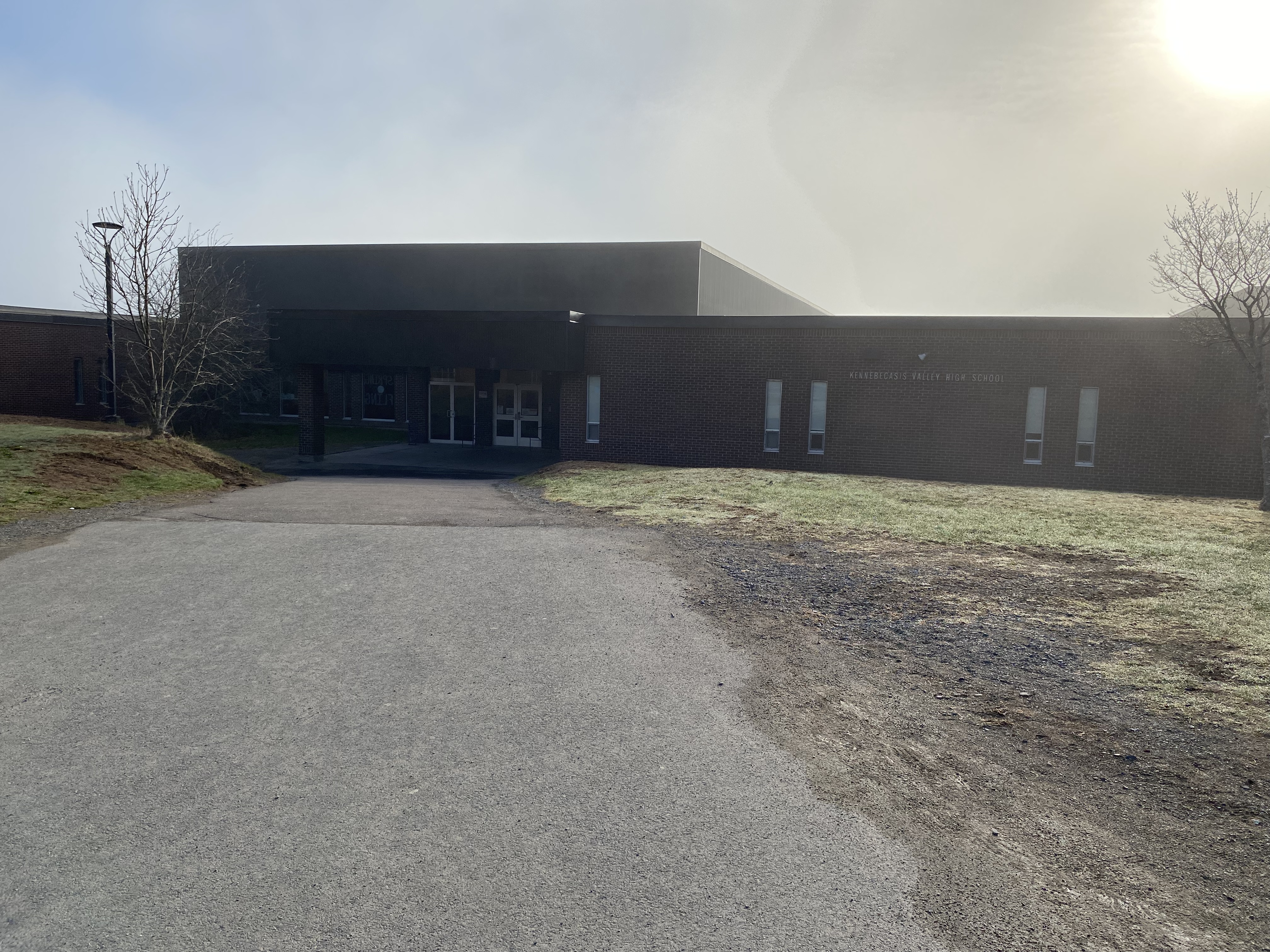

Location
- 398 Hampton Road; Quispamsis, New Brunswick, E2E 4V5; Canada; 45.4243°N 65.9476°W

Information
- Type: Public
- Motto: Crusading for Good
- Established: 1975
- School district: Anglophone South School District
- School number: 1941
- Principal: Peter Smith
- Teaching staff: 71
- Grades: 9-12
- Enrollment: 1,104 (2022-2023)
  - Grade 9: 273
  - Grade 10: 269
  - Grade 11: 280
  - Grade 12: 278
- Colours: Blue and White
- Mascot: Knight (formerly Crusader)
- Team name: Blue Knights
- Rival: Rothesay High School
- Graduates: 236 (2021-2022)
- Nicknames: KVHS, KV High
- Website: kennebecasisvalley.nbed.ca
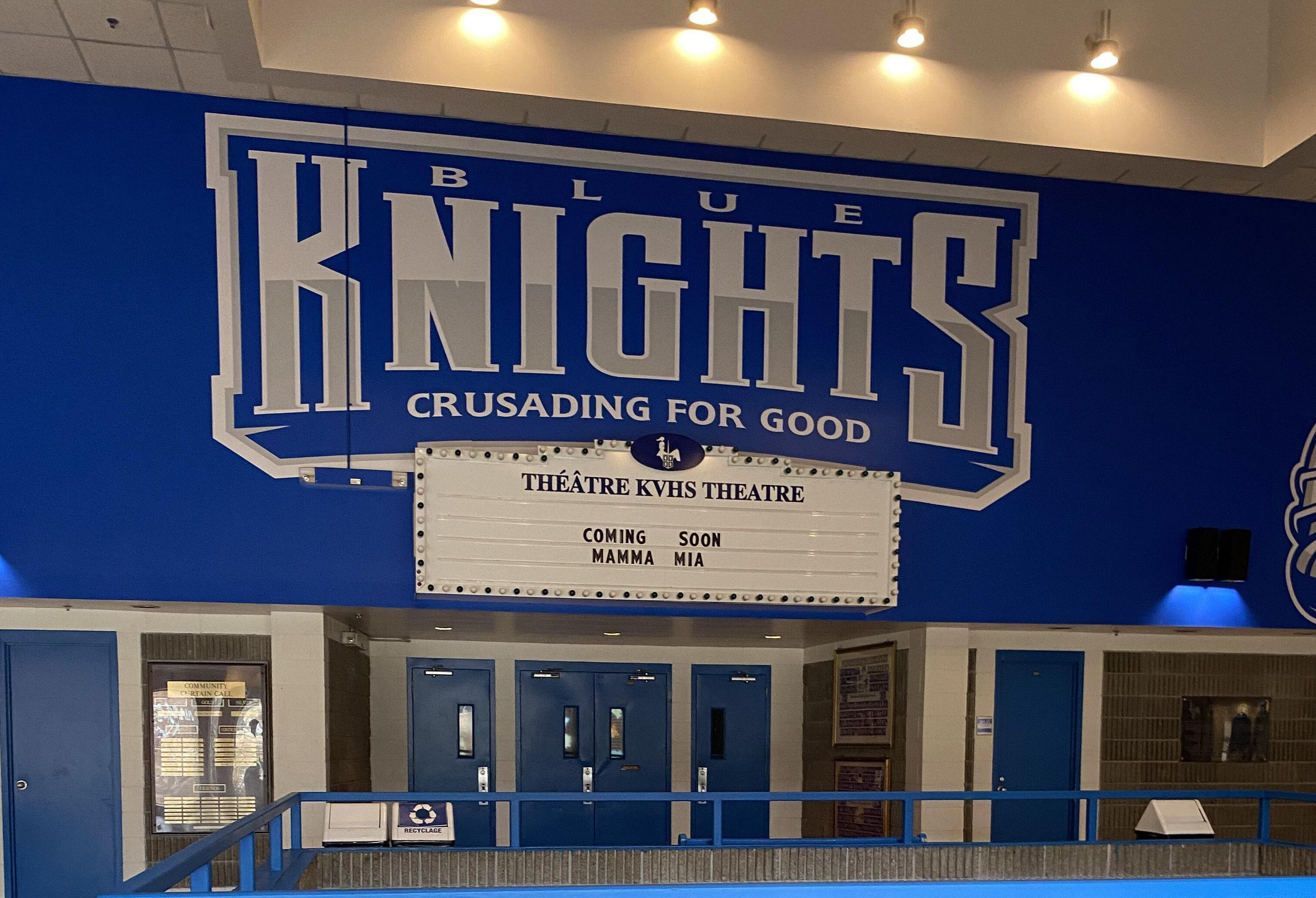
- KVHS's interior lobby displaying its new team name "Blue Knights" along with motto "Crusading for Good"

Kennebecasis Valley High School (KVHS) is a public secondary school located in Quispamsis, New Brunswick, Canada. Established in 1975, it is part of the Anglophone South School District, serving students from grades 9-12. The current principal is Peter Smith.

With a student enrolment of 1,104 during the 2022-2023 school year, Kennebecasis Valley High School is the largest high school in Kings County. Additionally, it is one of six high schools that provides a location for The Work Room, an Anglophone South career consultation and resource centre. The school’s theatre is used outside of school purposes by the KV Players, a community-run performing arts theatre.

== History ==
=== Development ===
The idea for Kennebecasis Valley High School was originated in the early 1970’s by the Board of School Trustees of School District 19, when in October 1972 they announced their plans for the construction of a new senior high school in the village of Quispamsis. The foundation work for the school was scheduled to start before the end of November, extending throughout the winter months, with the remainder of its first phase of construction to be contracted after its completion. The building’s architects, Mott, Myles & Chatwin, estimated that the first phase would take 18 months to finish.

The building was designed to have approximately 32 classrooms, accommodating an expected 700-800 students. The first stage of the building’s area of 130,000 square feet (12,000 m^{2}) also featured an administration area, guidance and health services, a library and a central core serving as a student meeting place and a lobby for a 500-seat theatre. Other amenities within the first phase also included a kitchen facility along with a 400-seat cafeteria, an adjacent area containing spaces for student government, several laboratories for physics, chemistry and biology instruction, as well as dedicated facilities for art and music programs.

The second phase, which the board had envisioned to commence immediately after the completion of the first phase, was to include a large gymnasium along with other sports and physical education facilities, an industrial shop as well as facilities for home economics and business education. Two major sports fields were also planned, with one designated for football and the other intended for soccer and various sporting events.

Despite being built in Quispamsis, the school was designated to serve students from the nearby communities of Rothesay, Kingston, and Hampton as well. A plan was put in place for the school’s name to be chosen in the spring by junior and senior high school students from the district.

Development planning for the new school was initiated to address overcrowded schools and offer home economics and industrial shop programs previously only available in Saint John schools. In April 1974, this first phase of KVHS had an estimated completion date set for August 1975, accommodating a capacity of approximately 1,000 to 1,200 students.

In March 1973, foundation work for the new school was still underway, and it was expected by later that month that specifications for the general construction contract would be ready for tender call. In late 1973, following a several-week long postponement, the Goodyear Paving Company was granted a contract worth $4,861,911 (equivalent to $26,276,588 in 2021) for the first phase of the school's construction. However, in early 1974, the construction progress faced further setbacks due to a shortage of steel, delaying the project for several months. At this point, the total cost of the school's construction was set at $5,166,911 (equivalent to $27,924,985 in 2021).

In May 1974, a year before the school officially opened, William J. Bishop, who served as principal of Simonds High School for the last eight years, was announced as principal of the new high school.

=== Later history ===
Between January 21–22, 1979, English acting partners Eric Sykes and Hattie Jacques visited KVHS to present A Hatful of Sykes.

Beginning in 2004, many KVHS students participate in a free lunch program provided by a nearby Baptist Church. Every Wednesday, church volunteers serve students hundreds’ of boxes worth of Kraft Dinner, along with hundreds of drinks, rolls, and popcorn bags. With 53 students attending the first lunch program, it now serves hundreds of KVHS students, with even some students from Rothesay High School attending.

Kennebecasis Valley High School was part of the former New Brunswick School District 06 until 2012, when it was merged with school subdistricts 8 and 10 to form the super district of Anglophone South School District (ASD-S).

==== Mascot change ====
On March 4, 2022, Kennebecasis Valley High School announced its decision to replace their longstanding mascot “Ken the Crusader” with "Knickie the Blue Knight," marking a transition following nearly 50 years. The change, which had been under consultation by school officials for the last two years beforehand, was implemented with the aim to embrace a more inclusive figure to represent the school. The change was met with outrage by far-right political commentary network Rebel News, who suggested the change resulted from either a Muslim student or parent being "upset over the Crusaders moniker," or from "some atheist progressives" who were "upset on the behalf of Muslim students and parents".

== Enrollment ==
As of the 2022-23 school year, KVHS had 1,104 students, with a teacher faculty count of 71. In the past, prior to the openings of Hampton High School in 1992 and Rothesay High School in 1998, KVHS enrolled over 1,900 students. In its opening year of 1975, the school, also referred to at the time as Kennebecasis Valley Senior High School, enrolled grades 10–12. On its first year, it enrolled over 700 students.

Enrollment in Kennebecasis Valley High School since 2011
Year	2011–2012	2012–2013	2013–2014	2014–2015	2015–2016	2016–2017	2017–2018	2018–2019	2019–2020	2020–2021	2021-2022	2022-2023
Enrollment	1,104	1,120	1,139	1,141	1,098	1,056	1,040	1,036	1,026	1,045	1,093	1,104
2011-2012 • 2012-2013 • 2013-2014 • 2014-2015 • 2015-2016 • 2016-2017 • 2017-2018 • 2018-2019 • 2019-2020 • 2020-2021 • 2021-2022 • 2022-2023

== Athletics ==
=== Rip Seely Challenge ===
Since 1999, Kennebecasis Valley High School's boys' and girls' basketball teams have participated in an annual Rip Seely Challenge basketball tournament against their rival school, Rothesay High School. The event has traditionally taken place every November, with the exception of 2020 and 2021, which were both cancelled as a result of the COVID-19 pandemic.

== Academic achievements ==
Kennebecasis Valley High School has found success in the annual Reach for the Top tournaments, where they often win the provincial championships. In 2024, the school has lost their streak of winning 10 provincial championships in a row, as well as a total of 17 provincial wins out of the last 19 seasons. In the national championships, KVHS has placed first three times in 2010, 2011, and 2016, and has made it to the top five 13 times. Additionally, the school has achieved national champions on CBC's SmartAsk trivia competition in 2002 as well as placed second in 2003.

Kennebecasis Valley High School Reach for the Top placements
Year	Provincial placement	Score	Won National?	Coach	Source
2006	1st place, gold medalist(s)	-	No (5th place)	Jason Thorne	
2007	1st place, gold medalist(s)	-	No	Jason Thorne	
2008	1st place, gold medalist(s)	-	No	Jason Thorne	
2009	1st place, gold medalist(s)	-	No (2nd place)	Jason Thorne	
2010	1st place, gold medalist(s)	-	Yes	Jason Thorne & Sarah Smith	
2011	1st place, gold medalist(s)	-	Yes	Jason Thorne	
2012	2nd place, silver medalist(s)	-	No	Jason Thorne	
2013	1st place, gold medalist(s)	-	No (5th place)	Jason Thorne	
2014	1st place, gold medalist(s)	-	No	Jason Thorne	
2015	1st place, gold medalist(s)	330-310	No (2nd place)	Jason Thorne	
2016	1st place, gold medalist(s)	-	Yes	Jason Thorne	
2017	1st place, gold medalist(s)	-	No	Jason Thorne	
2018	1st place, gold medalist(s)	-	No	Jason Thorne	
2019	1st place, gold medalist(s)	-	No (10th place)	Jason Thorne	
2021	1st place, gold medalist(s)	420-320	No(8th place)	Jason Thorne	
2022	1st place, gold medalist(s)	370-270	No(7th place)	Jason Thorne	
2023	1st place, gold medalist(s)	340-140	No (3rd place)	Jason Thorne	
2024	3rd place, bronze medalist(s)	-	-		

== Artistic achievements ==
KVHS is known in New Brunswick for their success at the New Brunswick Drama festival every year. The theatre program was started by the original principal William Bishop. Suzanne Doyle-Yerxa then ran the theatre program at the school from 1977 to 2010 before her retirement in June 2010. That year, a scholarship was commemorated under her name: The Suzanne Doyle-Yerxa award. It is awarded to a student who plans to pursue the performing arts or creative arts as a post secondary study. KVHS has also received attention for its strong visual arts and music programs.

== Theatrical productions ==
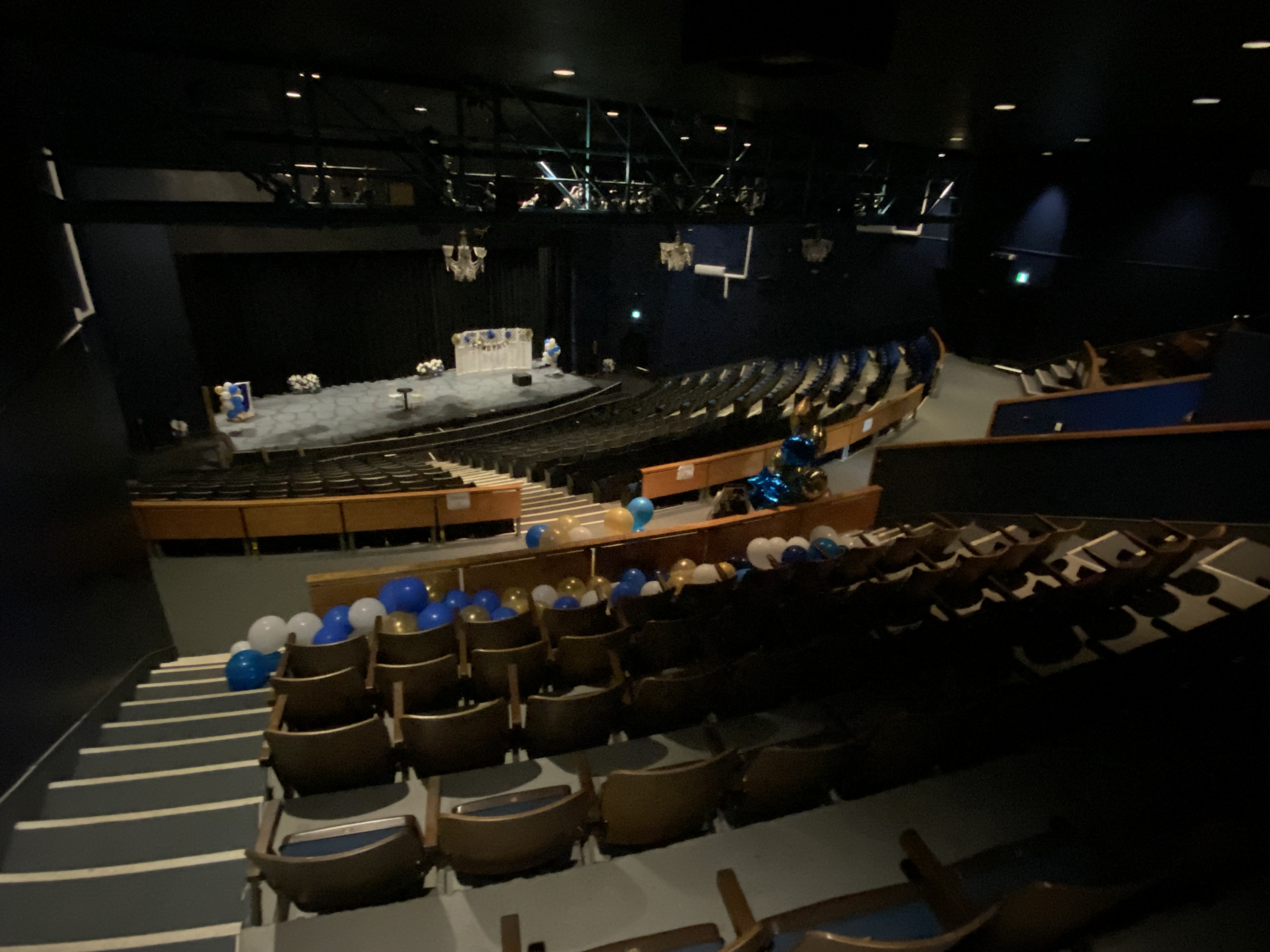
The Kennebecasis Valley High School theatre, as seen from the back row

Kennebecasis Valley High School started working on theatrical productions in 1975, the same year the school first opened. Its drama club was created and organized in October 1975, with its first production, Thornton Wilder's Our Town, which would only be played to staff and students, scheduled for early November. However, the play was later delayed and rescheduled for "some time in January", the following year. Additionally, there were plans underway for the school's first musical production, The King and I, which, following an assembly announcement in January 1976, attracted nearly 200 student volunteers, to be presented "some time in April or May". In January 1976, the production date was scheduled for "sometime in March". The musical, which ended up casting about 60 people, was presented through May 12–15, 1976, at the school's theatre.

=== Musical productions ===
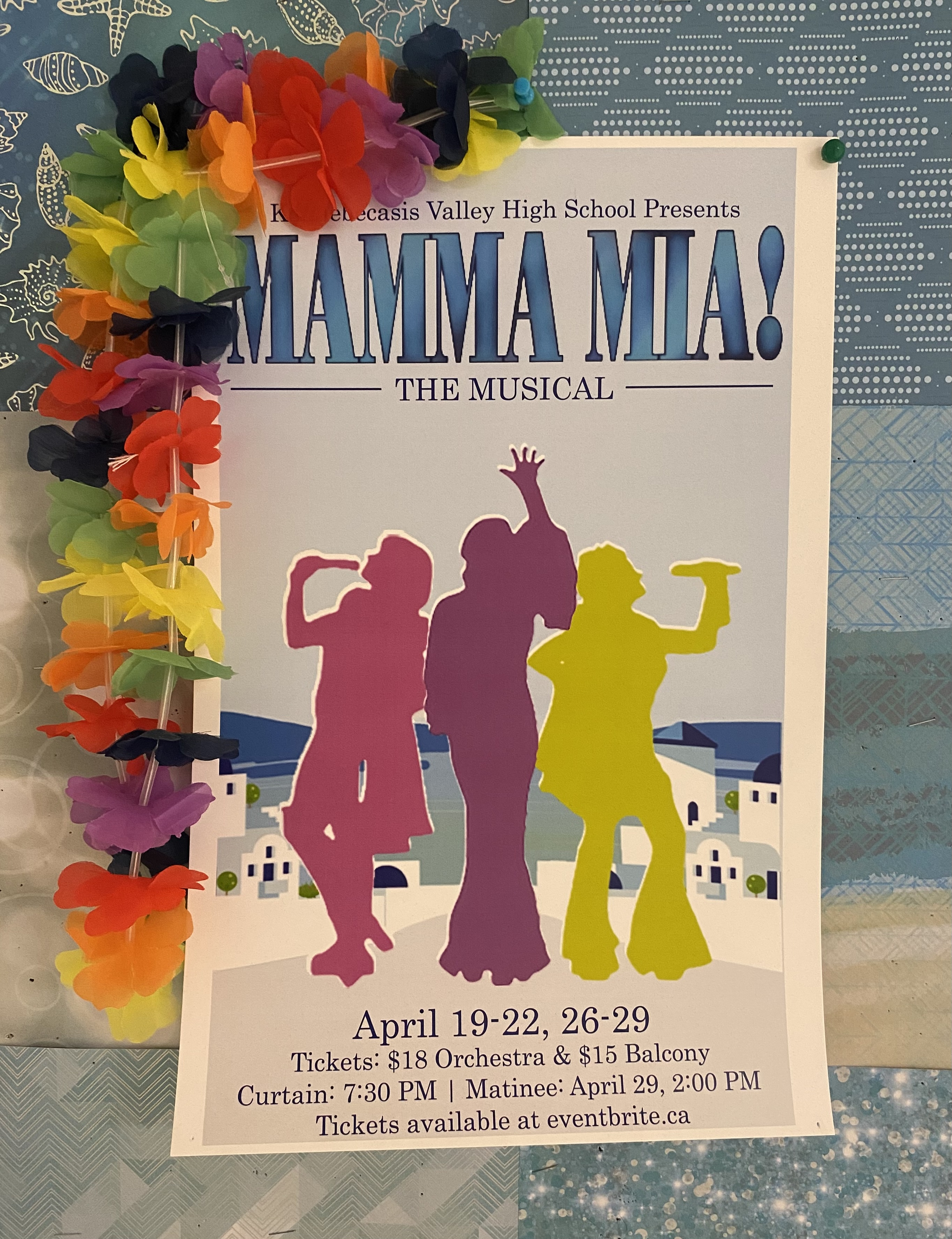
Promotional poster for Mamma Mia!, the subject of the 2023 musical

- 1979: Godspell
- 1992: Bye Bye Birdie
- 1993: Peter Pan
- 1994: Guys and Dolls
- 2003: West Side Story
- 2008: Children of Eden
- 2010: Beauty and the Beast
- 2012: The Music Man
- 2013: Legally Blonde
- 2014: The Wedding Singer
- 2015: Grease
- 2016: Tarzan
- 2017: Footloose
- 2018: The Wizard of Oz
- 2019: Hello, Dolly!
- 2020: Crazy for You
- 2022: High School Musical
- 2023: Mamma Mia!
- 2024: May We All
- 2026: Legally Blonde

=== Dramatic productions ===
- 1975-76: Our Town
- 1976-77: Flowers for Algernon
- 2007: The Laramie Project
- 2017: 7 Stories
- 2019: Night Watch
- 2022: Almost, Maine

== Notable alumni ==
- Tricia Black, actor, comedian
- Randy Jones (ice hockey), former NHL player
- Rob Moore, Member of Parliament for Fundy Royal
- Michael Yerxa, filmmaker
- Cynthia Johnston, basketball player and competitor in the 1996 Summer Olympics
- Rob Cotterill, film producer and assistant director
- Sharon Creelman

== See also ==
- Anglophone South School District (ASD-S)
