= Saint John Transit =

Public transit agency in Saint John, New Brunswick

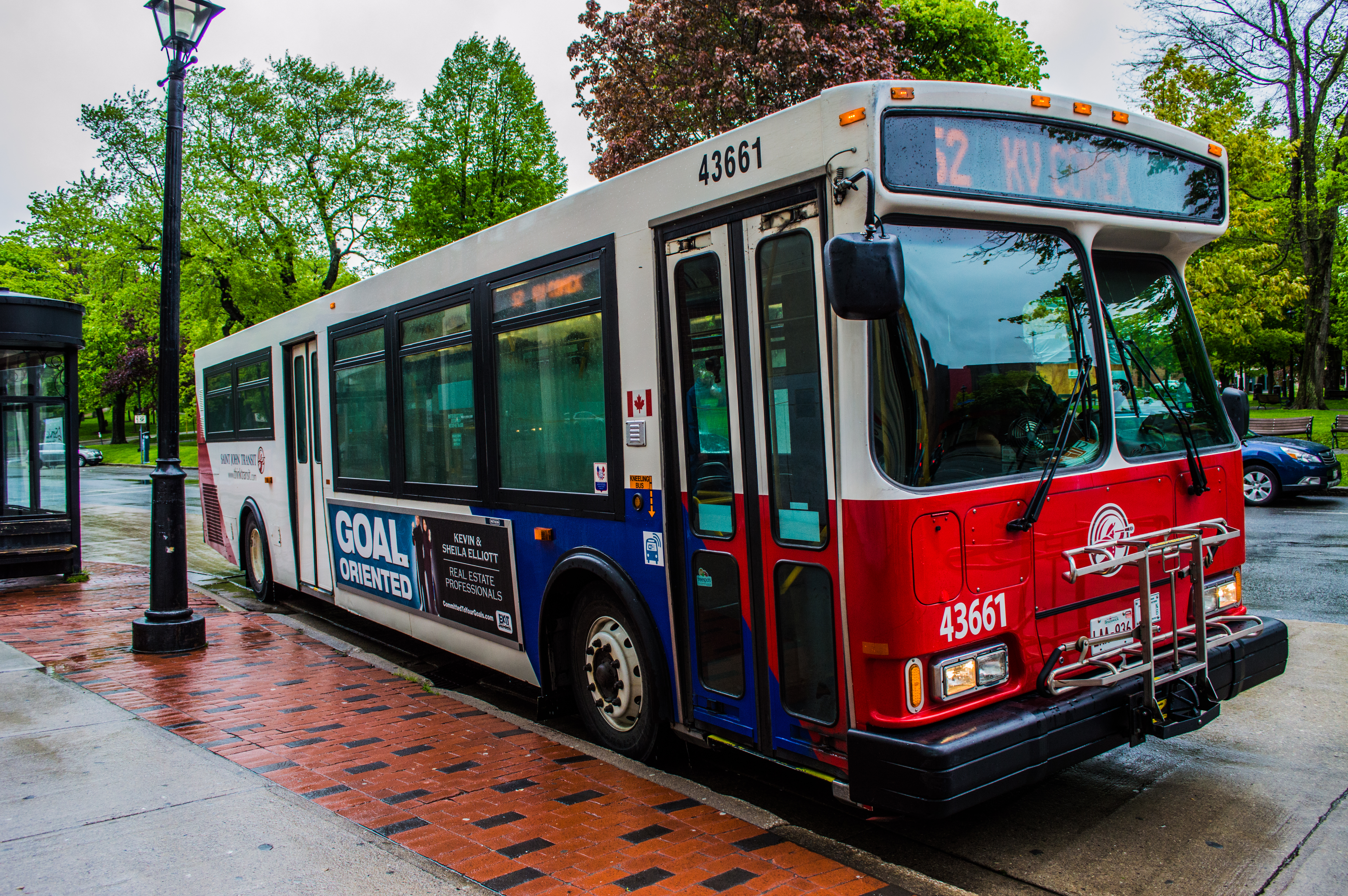
- Founded: 1979
- Headquarters: 55 McDonald Street Saint John
- Service area: Saint John, Rothesay, Quispamsis, Hampton
- Service type: bus service
- Routes: 14 local routes; 1 regional route; 3 FLEX on-demand zones.
- Stops: 723 (2024)
- Hubs: King's Square North; Lancaster Mall; Place 400; Metcalf St; McAllister Place
- Fleet: 40 40-foot diesel buses; 6 mini electric buses; 8 mini diesel buses
- Annual ridership: 2,177,000 (2024)
- Fuel type: Diesel and Electric
- Operator: Saint John Transit Commission
- Website: Official website

Saint John Transit is the public transit agency serving Saint John, New Brunswick, Canada. Established in 1979 to provide scheduled transit service to the city, it is the largest public transit system in the province in terms of both mileage and passengers.

== Services ==
=== Fixed routes ===
Saint John Transit provides 7 day a week service, with a series of Main Line routes that provide the backbone of the system and feeder routes that connect at 4 major hubs throughout the city. Service begins as early as 5:50 am on main routes, and around 6 am for secondary and limited routes and ends as late as 11:10 pm on some of the main routes and around 10 pm on secondary.

| Route No. | Route name | Service type | Sunday Holiday | Note |
|---|---|---|---|---|
| 1 | McAllister Place / Field House | Main Line | YES | |
| 3 | McAllister Place / Regional UNB | Main Line | YES | |
| 9 | McAllister Place / Regional Hospital | Main Line | YES | |
| 12 | Martinon | West-side | | |
| 15 | Harbour Bridge | West-side | YES | |
| 20 | Wright St. / Fort Howe | North and South | | |
| 21 | South End / St. Joseph's | North and South | | |
| 23 | Crescent Valley | North and South | | |
| 24 | North End | North and South | | |
| 30 | Champlain Heights/Silver Falls | East-side | | |
| 31 | Forest Glen | East-side | YES | |
| 32 | Loch Lomond | East-side | | |
| 33 | Champlain Lakewood | East-side | | |
| 35 | NBCC Express | East-side | | |
| 52 | Kennebecasis Valley Comex | Comex | | |

=== FLEX service ===
FLEX service does not operate on a fixed route or schedule. Riders must use a smartphone app or call a dispatcher to schedule a ride from a specified FLEX stop. Riders can travel within a zone, or transfer to routes 1, 12 or 15 at common stops. FLEX service is provided Monday to Friday from 6:30 am to 6:30 pm, and on Saturday from 10 am to 6 pm. Saint John Transit uses six leased Karzan electric buses for FLEX service. The 20-foot (6.1 m) buses can carry 20 passengers.

As FLEX service is rolled out, Saint John Transit has discontinued or rerouted fixed routes.

=== Saint John Accessible Transit ===
The Saint John Accessible Transit service is provided by Independence Plus Inc. for people who cannot use the regular transit system due to disabilities. The service was formerly known as the Handi-bus – this name has been changed due to its 'derogatory and degrading' connotations. The city will gain a new bus for its services, bringing the total of the fleet to six.

== History ==
Saint John Transit had six predecessors:

- People's Street Railway Company (1869–1876): Horsecar operation
- Saint John City Railway Company (1887–1892): Horsecar operation
- Consolidated Electric Company (1892–1897): Streetcar operation (electrified April 12, 1893)
- Saint John Railway Company (1897–1917): Streetcar operator
- New Brunswick Power Company (1917–1948): Streetcar and bus operator (buses since 1936; streetcars until August 7, 1948)
- City Transit Limited (1948–1979?): city bus operator
- Saint John Transit Commission (1979–date): current city bus operator

== See also ==
- Public transport in Canada
