= Rothesay, New Brunswick =

Rothesay
- Town
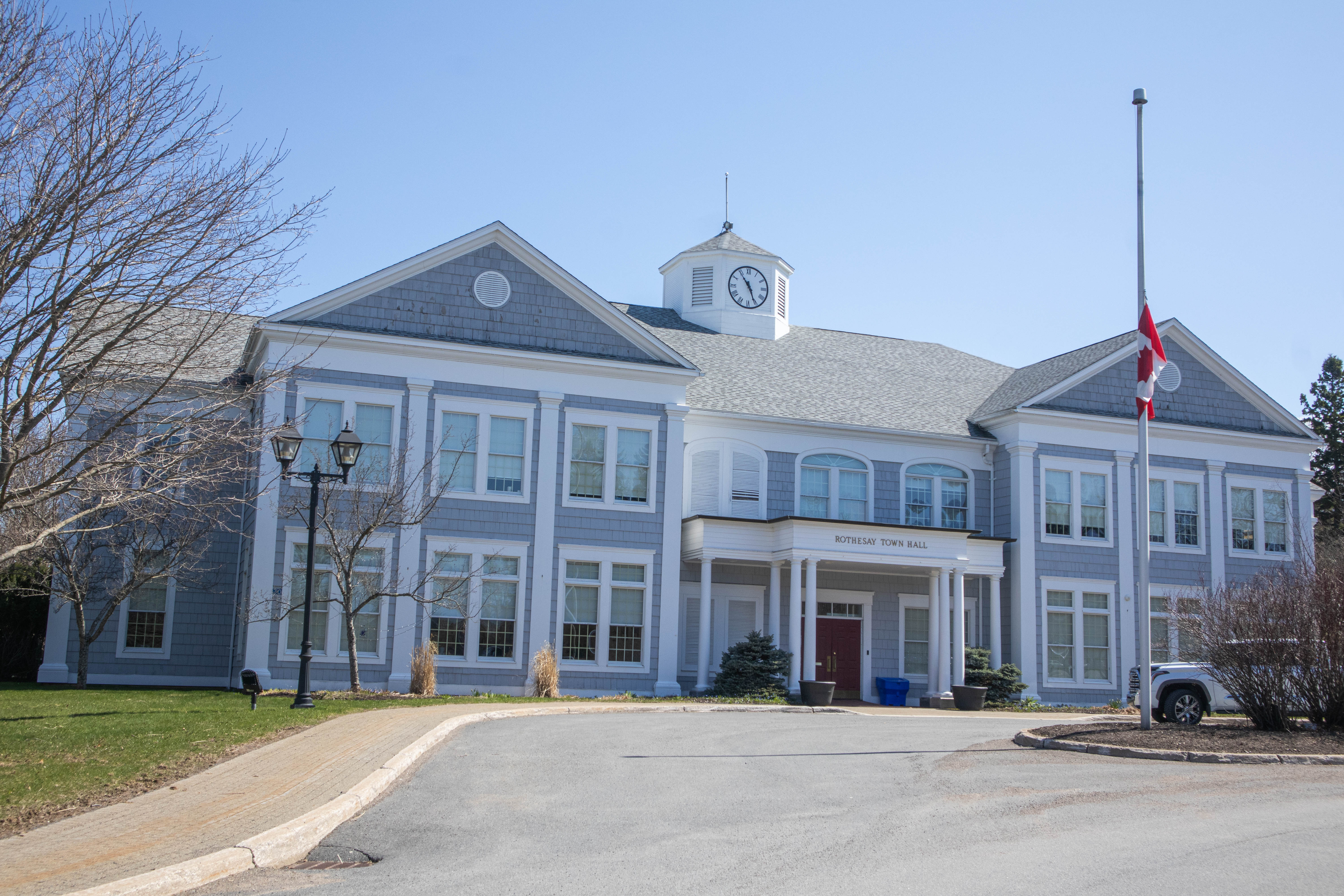
- Rothesay Town Hall

- Flag Coat of arms
- Motto: "Quinque Iuncta In Uno" (Latin) "Five United In One
- Location of Rothesay Rothesay (Canada)
- Coordinates: 45°22′59″N 65°59′49″W
- Country: Canada
- Province: New Brunswick
- County: Kings County
- Founded: 4 August 1860
- Amalgamation: 1 January 1998
- Electoral Districts Federal: Saint John—Kennebecasis
- Provincial: Rothesay

Government
  - Type: Town Council
  - Mayor: Matt Alexander
  - MP: Wayne Long
  - MLA: Alyson Townsend

Area
  - Land: 34.59 km^{2} (13.36 sq mi)
- Elevation: 0 to 75 m (0 to 246 ft)

Population (2021)
  - Total: 11,977
  - Density: 346.2/km^{2} (897/sq mi)
  - Change (2016–21): ▲2.7%
- Time zone: UTC−04:00 (AST)
  - Summer (DST): UTC−03:00 (ADT)
- Canadian postal code: E2E, E2H
- Area code: 506
- Telephone Exchange: 847, 848, 849, 216
- NTS Map: 21H5 Loch Lomond
- GNBC Code: DACOY
- Website: www.rothesay.ca

Rothesay (/ˈrɒ(θ)seɪ/) is a suburban town located in Kings County, New Brunswick, Canada. Located within Saint John's metropolitan area, it borders the town of Quispamsis to form the Kennebecasis Valley and is located along the lower Kennebecasis River. As of 2021, the population of Rothesay was 11,977.

== Geography ==
Located along the lower Kennebecasis River valley, Rothesay borders the city of Saint John to the southwest, and the neighbouring town of Quispamsis to the northeast. It is served by a secondary mainline of the Canadian National Railway, though there is no longer any passenger service on the line.

== History ==
The town of Rothesay developed first as a shipbuilding centre and later as a summer home community for Saint John's wealthy elite with the arrival of the European and North American Railway in 1853. There is a commonly known story that the new town was named in honour of the visiting Prince of Wales, later King Edward VII, in 1860 because the area was said to have reminded him of Rothesay, on the Isle of Bute, in Scotland.

However, an entry made in the diary of William Franklin Bunting, of Saint John, during the same visit refers to the Rothesay train station. It is unlikely that the name would have taken hold less than a day after the prince's passage through the settlement and so it likely predates the visit or was specifically bestowed on the town in the prince's honour as Duke of Rothesay. In 1870, a Saint John-owned ship named Rothesay made a famous voyage when a 20-year-old woman named Bessie Hall took command of the fever-stricken ship and sailed it from Florida to Liverpool, England.

== Present day ==
Many historical landmarks are located in the town of Rothesay, such as the Rothesay Common, the Rothesay Yacht Club, the former train station (one of the last remaining examples of early railway architecture in Canada), many homes that pre-date Confederation, public parks and modern amenities. The community provides numerous places of worship and recreation, along with the convenience of local retail and large-scale commercial developments in the nearby city of Saint John. Police services are provided by Kennebecasis Regional Police Force.

Rothesay lies in the Anglophone South School District. Schools include Rothesay Park School, Rothesay High School, Rothesay Netherwood School, and Fairvale Elementary School. Rothesay was formerly the headquarters of New Brunswick School District 06; both New Brunswick Route 100 and New Brunswick Route 111 run through the town and connect with New Brunswick Route 1. The city is served by Saint John Transit.

== Demographics ==
In the 2021 Census of Population conducted by Statistics Canada, Rothesay had a population of 11,977 living in 4,873 of its 5,007 total private dwellings, a change of 2.7% from its 2016 population of 11,659. With a land area of 34.59 km^{2} (13.36 sq mi), it had a population density of 346.3/km^{2} (896.8/sq mi) in 2021.

Rothesay, NB Historical populations
Year	Pop.	±%
1951	896	—
1956	802	−10.5%
1961	782	−2.5%
1966	893	+14.2%
1971	1,038	+16.2%
1976	1,283	+23.6%
1981	1,784	+39.0%
1986	1,605	−10.0%
1991	1,647	+2.6%
1996	1,695	+2.9%
2001	11,505	+578.8%
2006	11,637	+1.1%
2011	11,947	+2.7%
2016	11,659	−2.4%
2021	11,977	+2.7%
in 1998, the former communities of East Riverside-Kinghurst, Fairvale, Renforth, Rothesay, and Wells amalgamated.

== Amalgamation ==
Following the December 1992 release of a government discussion paper entitled "Strengthening Municipal Government in New Brunswick's Urban Centres", a series of localized feasibility studies were commissioned by the Frank McKenna Liberals targeting six geographic areas: Edmunston, Campbellton, Dalhousie, Miramichi, Moncton, and Saint John. In each instance, a panel composed of local representatives and expert consulting staff made specific recommendations for each urban-centred region. The report for the Greater Saint John area, "A Community of Communities: Creating a stronger future" - often referred to simply as the Cormier Report - offered two potential solutions to the Province for consolidating the many municipalities in Greater Saint John, neither of which was ultimately adopted by government.

Option one offered by the Cormier Report was to create three communities with regionalization of some services. Under this option, the six Kennebecasis Valley communities (East Riverside-Kinghurst, Fairvale, Gondola Point, Quispamsis, Renforth, and Rothesay) plus the local service district of the Parish of Rothesay would be consolidated into one new municipality. The Town of Grand Bay and various unincorporated areas around Saint John would also be consolidated into the City of Saint John to form the second new municipality. The third municipality in this scenario would be Westfield, which would remain separate because it was more rural and less populated. In this scenario, many services including water and sewerage, planning, and economic development would be regionalized across the three municipalities.

The second option offered by Cormier was a full consolidation of eight of the existing communities into one new city. In this scenario, only Westfield would remain a separate municipality. Full consolidation was unpopular among residents outside the City of Saint John. Suburban residents stated generally that they were pleased with their communities as they were and that they liked their lower tax rates. As Cormier summarized it, residents "perceive Saint John as an expensive, poorly managed bureaucracy that does not serve its citizens well. They fear loss of control, loss of services, and loss of neighbourhood friendliness and sense of community." Suburban residents' comments at public meetings support this description. One Fairvale resident stated that he resented the questionnaire Commissioner Cormier had circulated to residents that asked them to rank their order of preference for his five reorganization schemes because it meant that the worst that full amalgamation could do is fifth place. As the resident put it, "full amalgamation into one city would come about three million, nine hundred and fifty-sixth on anybody's choice. That would come just above amalgamation with Red China."

Ultimately, neither of the two options was implemented. Rather, the provincial government chose to proceed with partial consolidations and opted to legislate cost sharing for five specific regional facilities. On 1 January 1998, the former incorporated villages of East Riverside-Kinghurst, Fairvale, and Renforth; the town of Rothesay; and part of the community of Wells in the local service district of the Rothesay Parish were amalgamated to form the town of Rothesay. The town motto, Quinque luncta In Uno (Five United In One), represents the joining together of the five founding communities.

Occasional discussion about the possibility of further amalgamating Rothesay with Quispamsis has not proceeded beyond the discussion phase, though the two municipalities do collaborate extensively to share services and facilities. Notably, both towns' boundaries were also left largely unaltered by the strategic restructuring undertaken during the Higgs-Allain Local Governance Reforms.

== Notable people ==
- Rear Admiral Daniel Lionel Hanington was sunk by a U-boat, participated in the sinking of another U-boat, eventually becoming Deputy Chief of Staff (Support) for NATO's naval command.
- Author of the first draft of the Universal Declaration of Human Rights, John Peters Humphrey attended Rothesay Netherwood School until his graduation in 1920.
- Billionaire industrialist James K. Irving resided in Rothesay until his death, as do some family members, including his niece Sarah Irving.
- Sarah Irving, Executive Vice President and Chief Brand Officer of Irving Oil, educated at and on the Board of Governors for the Rothesay Netherwood School.
- Canadian aviation pioneer Wallace Rupert Turnbull invented the variable-pitch propeller in Rothesay.
- British comedian, James Mullinger moved to Rothesay in 2014. Mullinger continues to pursue his comedy career by selling out shows across Canada and appearing on numerous television shows, movies, festivals, and award shows.
- Former scion of Moosehead Breweries, Richard Oland. He was born and raised in Rothesay alongside his brother, Derek Oland, the successor of Moosehead. He was murdered by bludgeoning in July 2011.

== See also ==
- List of communities in New Brunswick
- Long Island (Kings County)
  - Minister's Face Nature Preserve
- Kings West (New Brunswick electoral district)
- Royal eponyms in Canada
