= Rothesay High School =

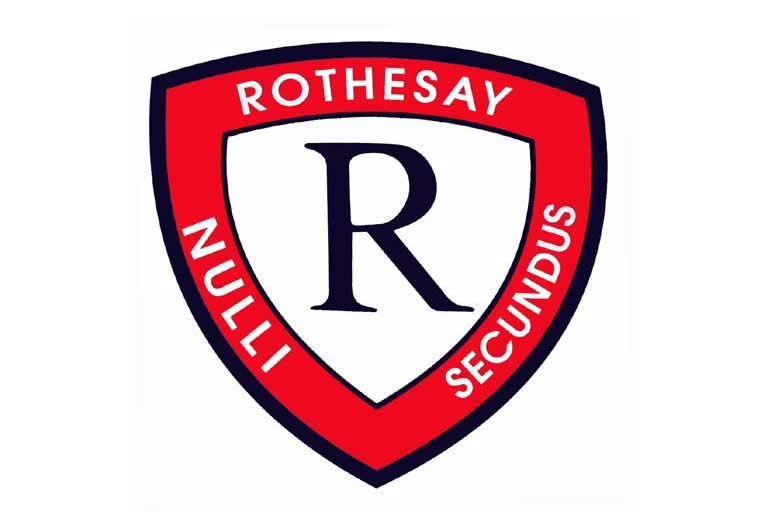

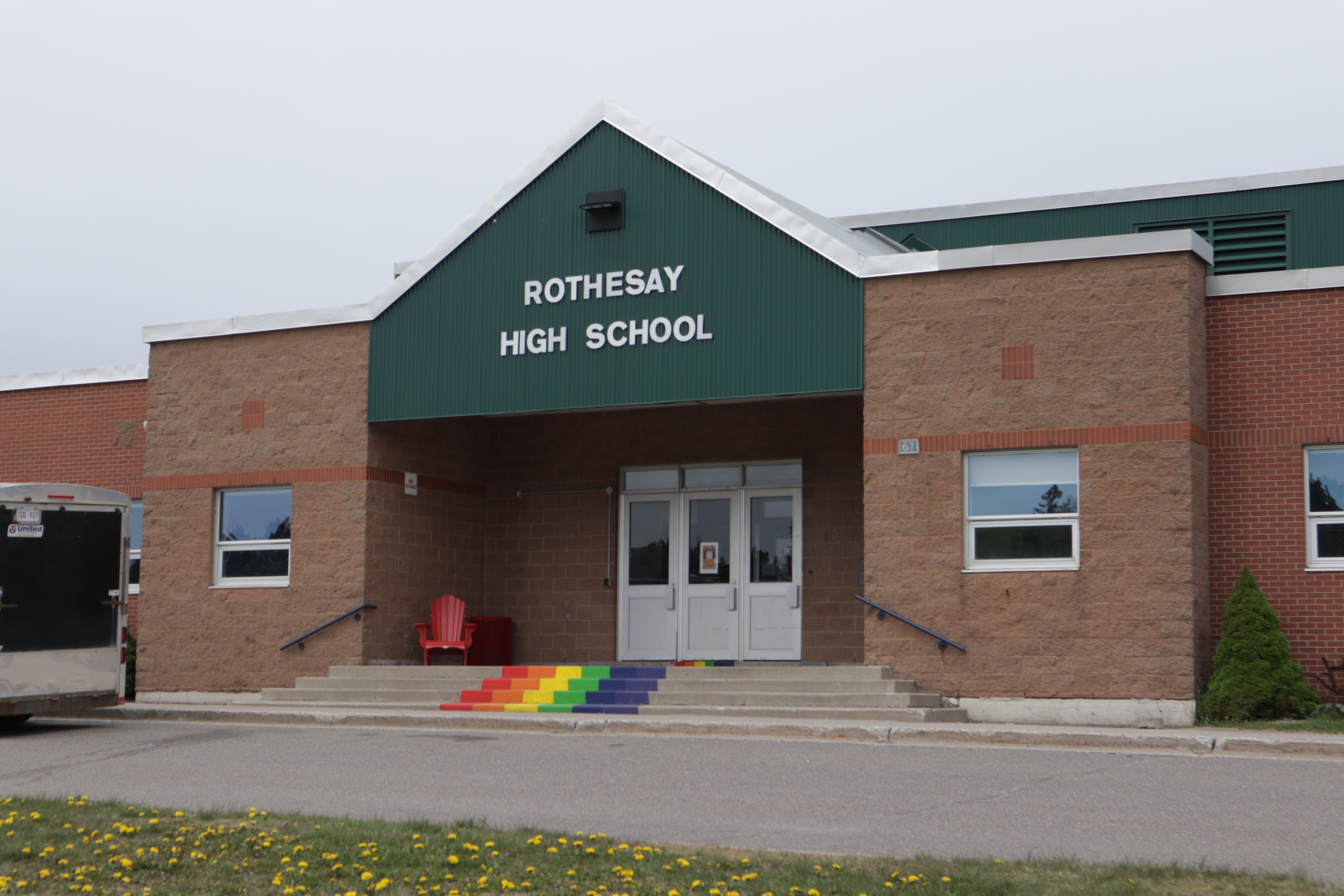

Location
- 61 Hampton Road; Rothesay, New Brunswick, E2E 5L6; Canada; 45.39415°N 65.98835°W

Information
- Type: Public
- Motto: Nulli Secundus ("Second To None")
- Established: 1997
- School district: Anglophone South School District
- School number: 1928
- Principal: B. MacDonald
- Enrollment: 578 (2022-2023)
- Colours: Red, White and Navy
- Mascot: Reggie The Red Hawk
- Team name: Red Hawks
- Rival: Kennebecasis Valley High School
- Website: www.rothesayhigh.ca

Rothesay High School is a high school located in Rothesay, New Brunswick, Canada. It is part of Anglophone South School District.

== History ==
Rothesay High School teaches students in grades 9 through 12. The population of 517 students reside primarily in the town of Rothesay. The school offers instruction in both French Immersion and English. The building itself is one story with a brick façade, located across the street from the former District 6 offices, and near both the Rothesay Arena and Harry Miller Middle School. It was constructed in 1951 and was called Rothesay Regional High School (RRHS), and served students in grades 6–12. In 1963 Rothesay Regional High School relocated in what is now Harry Miller Middle School and this building became Rothesay Junior High School. In 1991 the building was damaged by fire. It was subsequently renovated and expanded, reopening in September 1992 as the new Rothesay Junior High School. In 1997 the building was redesignated as a high school, graduating its first class in 2000. Rothesay High's first principal was Richard Forrester, who retired in 1998, the school's inaugural year. From 1998 to 2012, Roger Brown was principal.
