= Greater Saint John =

Metropolitan area surrounding Saint John, New Brunswick, Canada

Coordinates: 45.3362°N 66.0491°W

- Census Metropolitan Area
- Saint John, N.B. Census Metropolitan Area
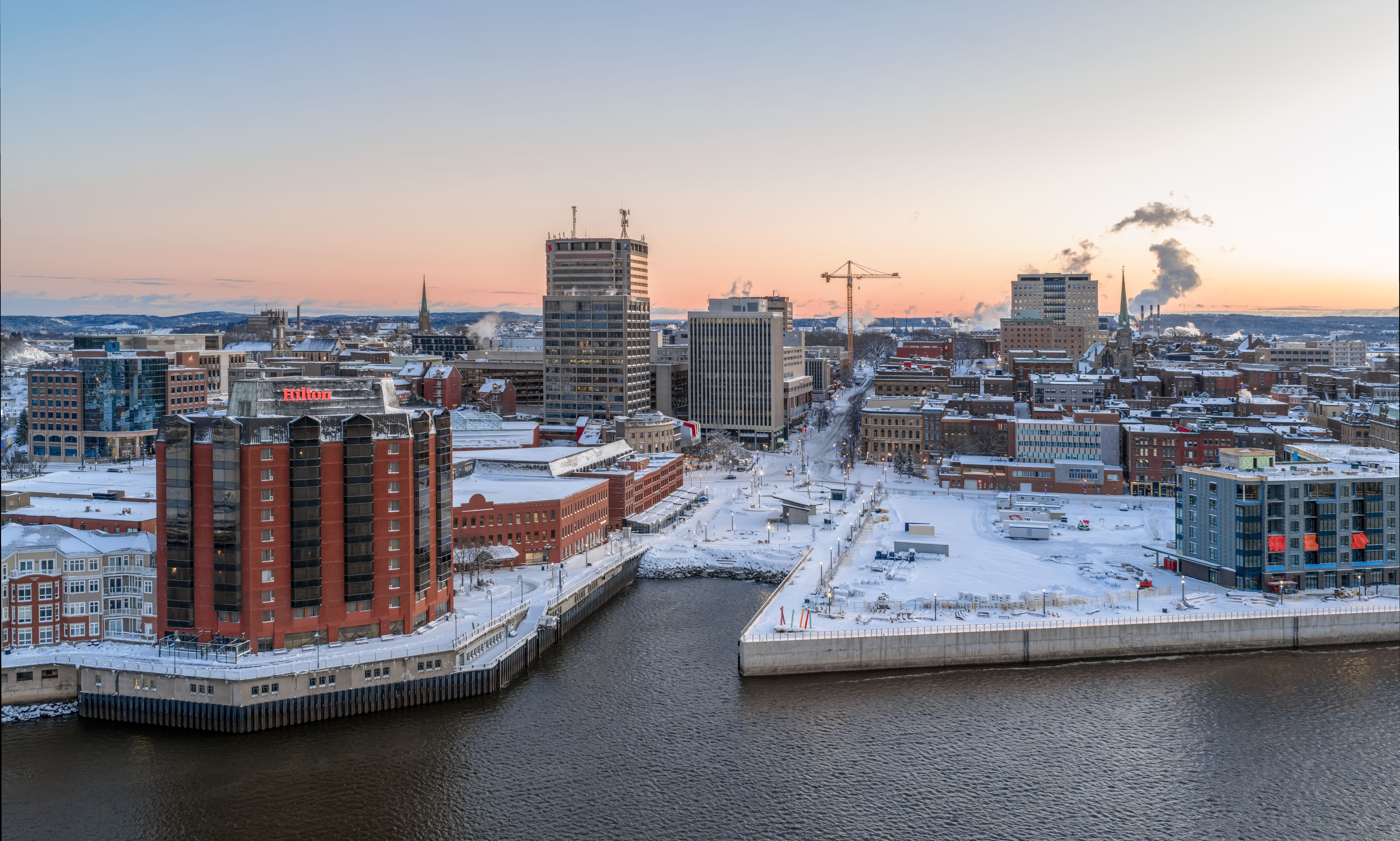
- Skyline of Saint John
- Interactive map of Greater Saint John
- Country: Canada
- Province: New Brunswick
- Principal city: Saint John
- Other cities: Quispamsis; Rothesay

Area (2011)
  - Total: 3,362.95 km^{2} (1,298.44 sq mi)

Population (2011)
  - CMA: 127,761
  - CMA density: 37.9/km^{2} (98/sq mi)

Gross Metropolitan Product
  - Saint John CMA: CA$6.4 billion (2020)
- Time zone: UTC−4 (AST)
  - Summer (DST): UTC−3 (ADT)

Greater Saint John (French: Grand Saint John) is a metropolitan area surrounding Saint John, New Brunswick, Canada. It had a population of 144,543 in 2025. The census metropolitan area of Saint John consists of 17 municipalities and parishes in addition to the City of Saint John.

== List of towns, communities and cities ==
Name	Type	County	Pop (2021)	Pop (2016)	Pop (2011)
Saint John	City	Saint John	69,895	67,575	70,063
Quispamsis	Town	Kings	18,768	18,254	15,239
Rothesay	Town	Kings	11,977	11,659	11,637
Grand Bay-Westfield	Town	Kings	4,967	4,964	4,981
Hampton	Town	Kings	4,395	4,289	4,004
Simonds Parish	Parish	Saint John	3,913	3,843	3,759
Kingston Parish	Parish	Kings	3,202	2,913	2,952
Hampton Parish	Parish	Kings	2,969	2,809	2,724
Westfield Parish	Parish	Kings	2,114	1,962	2,053
Upham Parish	Parish	Kings	1,357	1,269	1,267
Norton Parish	Parish	Kings	1,325	1,301	
Musquash Parish	Parish	Saint John	1,253	1,194	1,235
Saint Martins Parish	Parish	Saint John	1,177	1,132	1,198
Greenwich Parish	Parish	Kings	1,126	1,058	1,043
Lepreau Parish	Parish	Charlotte	803	707	824
Petersville Parish	Parish	Queens	710	681	758
Fundy-St. Martins	Village	Saint John	320	276	386
Rothesay Parish	Parish	Kings	342	325	350

== See also ==
- Transportation in Greater Saint John
