= Renforth, New Brunswick =

Community in New Brunswick, Canada

Coordinates: 45°21′20.6″N 66°0′45.2″W

Renforth is a Canadian suburban community and former village in Kings County, New Brunswick. It is situated on the south bank of the Kennebecasis River northeast of Saint John.

It is named after James Renforth, a rower from Britain who had died of heart failure during a match against Saint John's famous Paris Crew in August 1870 in the waters of the Kennebecasis River off the community. The name was changed to Renforth in 1903. Previously, the resort community was known as "the Chalet".

On January 1, 1998 the village was merged with several other communities situated along the lower Kennebecasis River to become part of an expanded town of Rothesay.

== See also ==
- List of neighbourhoods in New Brunswick
