= Gondola Point =

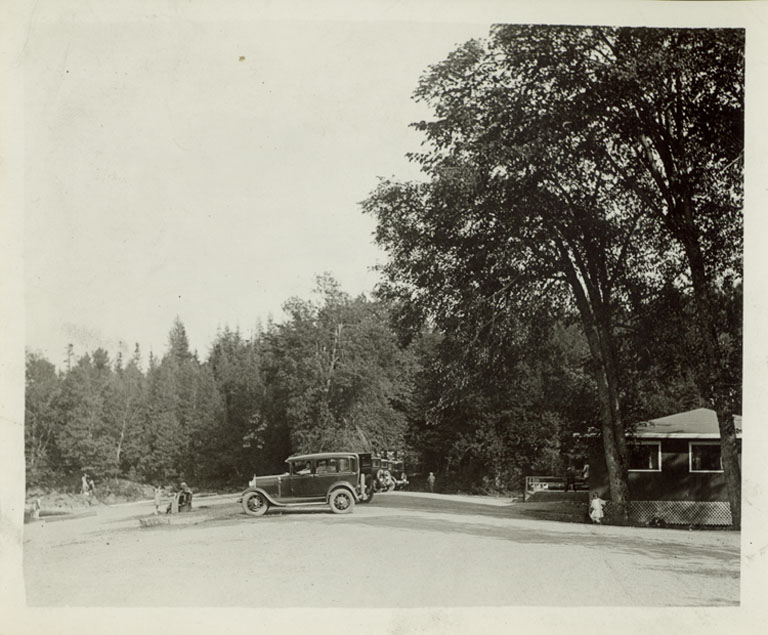

- Gondola Point (New Brunswick) Location of Gondola Point in New Brunswick
- Coordinates: 45.438875°N 65.995388°W
- Country: Canada
- Province: New Brunswick
- Town: Quispamsis

Area
  - Land: 9.12 km^{2} (3.52 sq mi)

Population (2001)
  - Total: 4,411
  - Density: 483.7/km^{2} (1,253/sq mi)
- Time zone: UTC−4 (Atlantic)
  - Summer (DST): UTC−3 (ADT)
- Area code: 506

Gondola Point is a former Canadian village and current neighbourhood of the town of Quispamsis located in Kings County, New Brunswick. It was amalgamated with the town of Quispamsis in 1998.

It is the location site of the Gondola Point Ferry, a cable ferry crossing that connects the Gondola Point Arterial to Route 845 at Reed's Point on the Kingston Peninsula.

It is also the location site of the St. Luke's Anglican Church. Built in 1833, the church is a National Historic Site of Canada and was registered in 2009.

== History ==
Between May 31 - June 1, 1937, the former Gondola Point schoolhouse was destroyed by a fire, which started around 11 p.m. on the night of May 31. At the time of the fire, the schoolhouse had been unused for multiple years. The origin of the fire was unknown.

On January 1, 1998, the village of Gondola Point, the town of Quispamsis, as well as a portion of the community of Wells merged to form an expanded version of Quispamsis. The former mayor of Gondola Point at the time, Leslie Hamilton-Brown, was named the mayor of the expanded town of Quispamsis.

== See also ==
- List of Neighbourhoods in New Brunswick
