= East Riverside-Kinghurst =

Coordinates: 45.373°N 66.004°W

East Riverside-Kinghurst was an incorporated village in Kings County, New Brunswick, Canada. It was amalgamated with the town of Rothesay on January 1, 1998, which it is now a neighbourhood of. Although the second half of the name was originally Kingshurst, the first 's' was dropped when the village was incorporated.
