= Wells, New Brunswick =

Coordinates: 45°23′N 65°55′W

Former location of Wells in New Brunswick

Wells was a community in Kings County, New Brunswick, Canada. It was incorporated into the town of Rothesay on January 1, 1998. The townsite is located 6.51 km east of Rothesay.

A post office was established in 1880 and removed in 1930.

In 1898, Wells was a farming settlement with a population of 40.
