= Fairvale, New Brunswick =

Urban community in New Brunswick, Canada

Fairvale
- Neighbourhood
- Location within New Brunswick
- Coordinates: 45°24′5.3″N 65°58′31″W
- Country: Canada
- Province: New Brunswick
- County: Kings County

Fairvale was an incorporated village in Kings County, New Brunswick, Canada. After settlers first arrived in 1819, it was used as a farming region until the early 20th century. On January 1, 1998, Fairvale was amalgamated with the town of Rothesay.

== History ==
Settlers first arrived in Fairvale in 1819, after which it was used as a farming region until the early 20th century. Previously known as Fairleigh around the 1880s, it was later renamed to Fairvale at an unknown date. Throughout the early 20th century, Fairvale became a summer community as well as later a dormitory community for people from Saint John. Fairvale, which also included a community known as Rosedale, was incorporated as a village in 1966, and later became disestablished after it was amalgamed with the town of Rothesay on January 1, 1998.

== See also ==
- List of neighbourhoods in New Brunswick
