= List of televised academic student quiz programs =

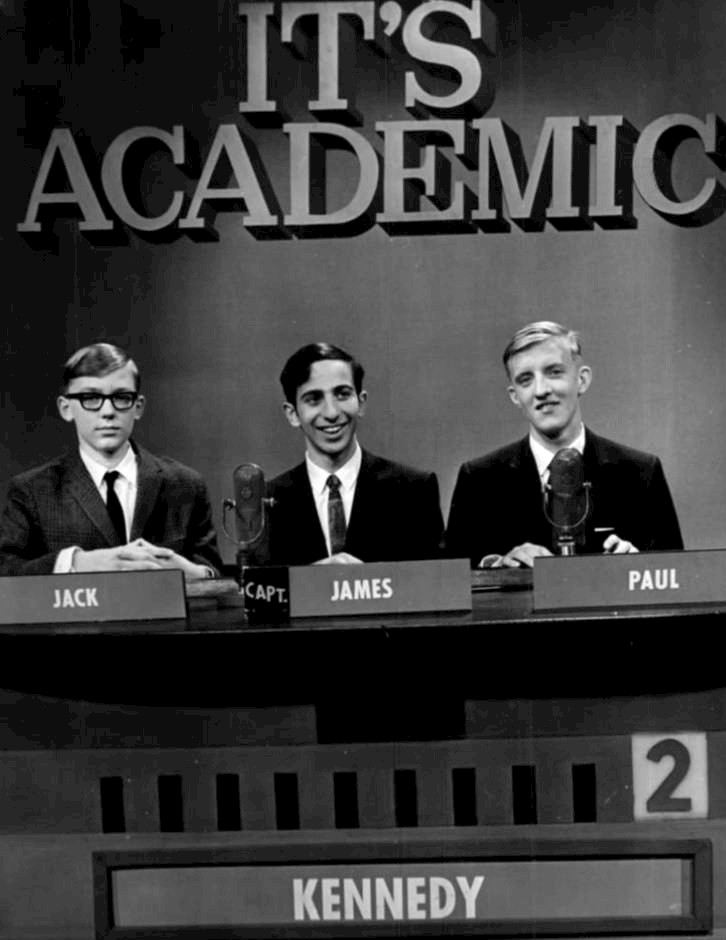
Kennedy High School on WMAQ-TV's It's Academic in 1967

Student quiz shows have appeared on television as both local and national programs since the second half of the 20th century. The following quiz programs have aired on local or national television, featuring teams from schools, colleges, or universities in academic competition.

== Shows on television ==
Title	Station / Network	Region / Media market	Premiere Year	Timeslot
Academic Bowl	WCTE	Cookeville, Tennessee	1986	daily, 11 am and 5 pm, March 18 – April 10
Academic Challenge	WSRE	Pensacola, Florida	2013	
Academic Challenge	WEWS	Cleveland, Ohio	1964	Saturdays, 11:30 am
Academic Challenge	KOBI; KOTI	Medford, Oregon; Klamath Falls, Oregon	2005	Sundays, 6:30 pm
Academic Decathlon SuperQuiz and Banquet	KLCS	Los Angeles, California	?	
Academic League	SDCOE ITV	San Diego, California	1991	live, late April,
Academic Quiz Bowl	PCTV	Pottstown, Pennsylvania	2012	Tuesdays, 6:30 – 7 pm
Arkansas Governor's Quiz Bowl	AETN	Arkansas	1985–present	live 9 am and 1:30 pm, Saturday, late April
As Schools Match Wits	WWLP (1961–2006); WGBY (2007–present)	Springfield, Massachusetts	1961	Saturdays, 7 pm
Battle of the Brains	WCVE (1978–2002); WAVY (2004–2009); WTVR (2003–present)	Richmond, Virginia	1978	Saturdays, 10 am
Bay Area Quiz Kids	Peninsula TV Channel 26 (–Present); KRON (?–?)	San Mateo County, California; San Francisco Bay Area (participants)	1999	Saturdays, 8 am, 4 pm, and 7:30 pm
Black College Quiz	Syndication 19??-2013; Bounce 2014–2016, 2020–present Aspire 2014–2016; Up 2014	Chicago, Illinois (origin); United States	2007	weekly
Bournvita Quiz Contest	Zee TV; Sony Entertainment Television	India	1972	Sundays
Brain Busters	WGAL	Lancaster, Pennsylvania; Harrisburg, Pennsylvania	2000	Sundays, 12 pm – 1 pm
Brain Game	WTHR	Indianapolis, Indiana	1972 or 1973	Saturdays, 7 pm
Brain Game	WRAL	Raleigh, North Carolina	1997	
Brain Game (previously Academic Challenge)	WBGU	Bowling Green, Ohio	2012	Thursday, 9 pm
CBSE Heritage India Quiz	History TV18	India	2001	
De Campus Cup	VRT Canvas; VRT 1	Flanders	2019	
The Challenge	MSG Varsity	New York; New Jersey; Connecticut	1996	daily, 6:30 pm
Double Down	WCNY	Syracuse, New York	~2009	Sundays, 6 pm (re-aired 11 pm)
Gettu betur	RÚV	Iceland	1986	
Golden Bell	KBS	South Korea	200?	
Granite State Challenge	NHPTV	New Hampshire	1983	
HDFC Life School Quiz (formerly ESPN School Quiz)	ESPN Star Sports	India		
High Five Challenge	KPTV 1993–19?? KWPB; KOIN; OPB 2006–2008; KPDX 2008–present	Oregon and Washington	1993	
High Q	WSB	Atlanta, Georgia	1986	Saturdays, 12:30 pm
High Q	KCOS	El Paso, Texas	1984	Saturdays, 11:30 am and 12 pm
High School Bowl	WNMU	Marquette, Michigan	1977	
High School Challenge	WFUM	Flint, Michigan	1984	
High School Quiz Bowl	Cox Channel 4	Baton Rouge, Louisiana		Annual
High School Quiz Show	WGBH	Massachusetts	2009	
Hispanic College Quiz	Syndication	Chicago, Illinois (origin); United States	2008	October
Histrionics	TVS	Sydney, Australia	2009	
Hometown High-Q	KDKA	Pittsburgh, Pennsylvania	2000	
In the Know	WBNS (1970s–80s); WOSU; WPBO	Columbus, Ohio; Portsmouth, Ohio	1964	Tuesdays, 7:30 pm
It's Academic	WRC; WETA-TV	Washington, D.C.	1961; 2022	
It's Academic	WBAL-TV (1971–89); WJZ (1989– )	Baltimore, Maryland	1971	
It's Academic	Seven Network	Australia	1968; 2005	
It's Academic Hawaii	KFVE	Honolulu, Hawaii	2013	Wednesdays, 7 pm
KEDT-TV Challenge (formerly Challenge!)	KEDT	Corpus Christi, Texas	2005	
Quiz Bowl	KTIV (?–2013(?); KCAU 2013–present	Sioux City, Iowa	2007?	Saturdays, 11 am
KYVE Apple Bowl	KYVE	Yakima, Washington; Central Washington	1980	
Mahindra Auto Quotient	NDTV	New Delhi, N.C.R.	2009	
Making the Grade	WYIN	Gary, Indiana	2011	
Malarvadi Little Scholar	Media One TV	Kerala	20??	various
Masterminds	TW3	Albany, New York; Upstate New York	?	
Masterminds	KRGV	Weslaco, Texas	1986	
MAX STAR Quiz Challenge	Star Plus	United Arab Emirates	2015	
Mind Games	KSBI	Oklahoma City, Oklahoma	2012	
Minnesota High School Quiz Bowl	BCTV 14	Burnsville, Minnesota	?	
National Geographic Bee (formerly National Geography Bee)	Syndication	United States	1989	Annual Tournament
National Super Quiz Bee	IBC 13; Studio 23	Philippines	1977	
News Channel 3 Knowledge Bowl	WREG	Memphis, Tennessee	?	
North County Academic League	ITV channel 16	San Diego County, California	1991	
Quest	KTWU	Topeka, Kansas	1984	
Quiz Bowl	GCTV	Guilford, Connecticut	2011	
Quiz Bowl	SETV	Stafford County, Virginia	2014	Saturdays, 7 pm
QuizBusters	WKAR	East Lansing, Michigan	1989	
QuizBusters	WNAB	Nashville, Tennessee	2008	
Quiz Central	WCMU	Central Michigan		
Quiz Mania	Kantipur Television; Nepal Television	Nepal	2012	
Quizmaster Challenge	MCPS 34	Montgomery County, Maryland	1988	
Quiz Show	KPBT	West Texas	2008	
Reach for the Top	CBUT; CBMT; CLT; CBC	Canada	1961	
Scholars' Bowl	East Tennessee PBS	Knoxville, Tennessee; Sneedville, Tennessee	1984	Weekdays, 5:30 pm
Scholastic Hi-Q	WSIU; WUSI	Carbondale, Illinois; Olney, Illinois	1986	Sundays 5:30 pm
Scholastic Scrimmage	WPSU; WLVT; WVIA	University Park, Pennsylvania; Lehigh Valley, Pennsylvania; Scranton/Wilkes-Barre area, Pennsylvania	1975	
School Duel	WBEC	Broward, Dade, Palm Beach Counties, Florida	2010	Thursdays 7 pm, January–June
Schools' Challenge Quiz	TVJ	Jamaica		
The Smart Brain	Flowers	Kerala	2016	
South Louisiana Quiz Bowl	KWBJ; KFOL	Morgan City, Louisiana; Houma, Louisiana	1987	Saturdays, Sundays; High schools, 5 pm, Junior Highs, 5:30 pm
Star Quiz Challenge	STAR India	Mumbai, Maharashtra	2011	
Stateline Quiz Bowl	WTVO; WQRF	Rockford, Illinois	2015	Saturdays 6:30 pm Sundays 8:30 am Sundays, 9:30 pm
Superkids	Arirang	South Korea	200?	
Tata Crucible Campus Quiz	CNBC TV18	India	2013	
University Challenge	ITV; BBC2	United Kingdom	1962 (original); 1994 (revival)	Mondays, 8 pm
Varsity Quiz	KLVX	Las Vegas, Nevada	1969	
WGEM Academic Challenge Quiz Bowl	WGEM	Quincy, Illinois		
Whiz Quiz	WPBS; WNPI	Watertown, New York; Norwood, New York		
Whiz Quiz	WTLW	Lima, Ohio		
U-Genius quiz	CNBC TV18	India	2024	
YSU Academic Challenge	WYTV; WNWO	Youngstown, Ohio; Toledo, Ohio	2002; 2010	

Shows broadcast in the United States

== Shows no longer on television ==
Title	Network	Region / Media Market	Original Run	
1 2 Stri	Grampian Television	Scotland	2005	
Academic Challenge	KRCR	Redding, California	1998–2005?	
Academic Challenge	WTVW	Evansville, Indiana	2012	
Academic Competition	unknown	Mississippi		
Academic Varsity Bowl (formerly Whiz Quiz)	WFAA	Dallas-Fort Worth, Texas	1977–1985	
Africa Challenge (formerly Zain Africa Challenge)	Syndication	Africa	2007–2011	
Alumni Fun	ABC; Syndication	United States	1963–1966	
Answers Please ("Little Red Schoolhouse" through 1970's)	WRGB	Albany, New York	1963–1989	
Battle of the Brains	RPN; PTV	Philippines	1992–2001	
Bible Bowl	Syndication; TLC	United States	197?–198? 2015	
Bracket Genius	ESPN2	United States	2017	
Brain Blasters	MPT	Maryland	1998 (pilot)	
Brain Brawl	unknown	Duval County, Florida	1997?–2013?	
Brain Game	WBNS	Columbus, Ohio	?	
Brainstorm	WGTE	Toledo, Ohio	2001?	
Brainstorm	Cox Cable Channel 7	Phoenix, Arizona	2007–2009	
Brainstormers	WLIW	Long Island, New York	1987–1991	
Braintrust	unknown	Central Illinois	?	
Brainwave	Channel 4 San Diego (cable)	San Diego, California	2008–2009	
City Smarts	WNYE	New York City	2002 (single season)?	
The Challenge	KTBU	Houston, Texas		
Challenge Trophy	Anglia	East Anglia	1965–1967	
Challenging Times	RTÉ	Ireland	1991–2001	
College Bowl	CBS; NBC; Syndication; Syndication; NBC; Disney Channel	United States	1959–1963; 1963–1970; 1978; 1979; 1984; 1987	
Comcast Academic Challenge	Comcast CN8	Delaware	1986–2008	
Cox Academic Tournament (previously Cox Communications Academic Tournament)	Cox-4	Escambia and Okaloosa counties, Florida	2001?–2011?	
Face Off Minnesota	TPT	Minneapolis-St. Paul, Minnesota	2006	
Fast Money MBA Challenge	CNBC	United States	2008	
Génies en herbe	Radio-Canada	Québec	1973–1997	
The Great India Quiz Show	Times Now	Singapore	2012–2013	
Honda Campus All-Star Challenge	BET; Syndication	United States	1990–1995	
High Five	WFRV	Green Bay, Wisconsin	late 60s	
Hi-Q	CKEM	Edmonton, Alberta		
High Q	WHIO	Dayton, Ohio	1993–2011	
High Q	WAVE	Louisville, Kentucky	1960–2000?	
High Q	WOWK	Charleston, West Virginia	1979–1998	
High Q	KGW	Portland, Oregon		
High Q	KWCH	Wichita, Kansas		
High Q (picked up by KTWU and known as Quest)	WIBW	Topeka, Kansas		
High-Q	WCVB	Boston, Massachusetts; Massachusetts	?–?	
High-Q	WTVT	Tampa Bay, Florida	1971–1977	
High Quiz Bowl	WSAW; WKBT	Wausau, Wisconsin	1985?	
High School Bowl	KHNL	Honolulu, Hawaii	1962–?	
High School Bowl	KSTP	Minneapolis-St. Paul, Minnesota	196?–1982	
High School Bowl	WTNH	New Haven, Connecticut	1980–91	
High School Bowl	KHQ	Spokane, Washington	1970s	
High School Bowl	WWBT	Richmond, Virginia	1960s–70s	
High School Bowl	WCHS	Charleston, West Virginia	1970s	
High School Quiz Bowl	WKAR	East Lansing, Michigan	1970s	
High School Quiz	WSPD	Toledo, Ohio	1948–1988	
INL Scholastic Tournament	IPT	Idaho	?–2012	
Idea Brand Equity Quiz	Times Now	Mumbai, Maharashtra	?	
Inquizitive	WLYH	Lancaster, Pennsylvania	2004–2009	
It's Academic	WBEN (1968–86); WGRZ (2008, 2013–14)	Buffalo, New York	1968–86; 2008; 2013–14	
It's Academic	WNBQ; WMAQ	Chicago, Illinois	1962–1977	
It's Academic	WLWT; WCPO-TV; WCET	Cincinnati, Ohio	1963–82	
It's Academic	WNBC	New York City	1963–1971	
It's Academic	WCVB	Boston, Massachusetts	?	
It's Academic	KOA	Denver, Colorado	?	
It's Academic	WTLV	Jacksonville, Florida	1967–1974	
It's Academic	KNBC	Los Angeles, California	?	
It's Academic	WRAL	Raleigh, North Carolina	?	
It's Academic	TVNZ	New Zealand	198?	
It's Academic	KYW	Philadelphia, Pennsylvania	1964–1967	
Jersey Knockout Quiz	Channel Television	Jersey	1970–1972	
Junior High Quiz Show	WTAE	Pittsburgh, Pennsylvania	1962–1979	
KidQuiz	KCBS	Los Angeles, California	198?–1992	
Klassroom Kwiz	WDBJ	Roanoke, Virginia	1964–1980 & 1993–1999	
Know Your Heritage	WLS; WBBM; WPWR; WCIU	Chicago, Illinois	1980–2010	Sundays 10:30 am
M. I. Four: The Ultimate Intelligence Quiz	ZeeQ	India	2012	
Matchwits	Rocky Mountain PBS	Colorado	1977	
McDonald's High School Challenge	KXJB	Fargo, North Dakota	2004–2012	Saturdays, 6:30 pm
National Quiz	Infoplus	Nepal	2013	
The New Quiz Kids	Global Television Network	Canada	1978	
NTV Peace Quiz	Nepal Television	Nepal	2014	
On Your Marks	Yorkshire Television	Yorkshire	1994–1995	
Piedmont Quiz Bowl	SCETV	South Carolina		
Pop Quiz	WVPT	Harrisonburg, Virginia; Shenandoah Valley	1979–2013	
Prep Quiz Bowl	WDSU	New Orleans, Louisiana	197?	
Public Library Quiz Bowl	UNC-TV	North Carolina	1981–2006	
Quiz '88	Community Access	Ottawa, Ontario	1988	
Quiz Kids	Syndication; CBS Cable	United States	1949–1956; 1981–1982	
Quiz Kids	WNAC	Boston, Massachusetts	1978	
The Quiz Kids	ATN-7; GTV-9	Australia	1957	
The Quiz Kids Challenge	Syndication	United States	1990	
Quiz Whiz Junior	Arirang TV	South Korea	2017	
Remember This?	MSNBC	United States	1996–1997	
Rutgers Academic Challenge (previously New Jersey Bowl)	NJN	New Jersey		
Sabado en Grande	WAPA; WJNX; WTIN	Puerto Rico	198?	
Scholars' Bowl	unknown	Virginia		
Scholars' Bowl	unknown	Quad Cities, Illinois, Iowa		
Scholars' Cup	WTVP	Peoria, Illinois	197?–2011	May
Scholars for Dollars	WCFE	Plattsburgh, New York	1982?-1993?	
Scholarship Bowl	WNEP	Scranton, Pennsylvania; Wilkes-Barre, Pennsylvania	1990–1991?	
Scholar Quiz	KMOX-TV	St. Louis, Missouri	c. 1964 – c. 1976	
Scholastic Scoreboard	WHNS	Greenville, South Carolina		
Scholastic Bowl	KET	Kentucky		
Schools Challenge	Granada Television	United Kingdom	1997	
Sixth Form Challenge	ITV	United Kingdom	1966–1967	
SmartAsk	CBC	Canada	2001	
Sports Challenge	Syndication; CBS	United States	1971; 1973	
Star Quiz Challenge	Star TV	United Arab Emirates	2018	
Teen Challenge	WMAZ	Macon, Georgia		
Texaco Star Academic Challenge	KPRC	Houston, Texas		
Texaco Star National Academic Championship	Discovery Channel	United States	1989	
Tidewater Challenge	WHRO	Norfolk, Virginia		
Top of the Form	BBC 1	United Kingdom	1962–1975	
Trivia Plus	Cable Atlantic Public Access	Newfoundland; Labrador	1991–1992	
TV-3 Challenge	TV-3	New Jersey	1970s	
TV Honor Society	WTAP	West Virginia	1980s	
Ulster Schools Quiz	Ulster Television; BBC Northern Ireland	Northern Ireland	198?–1992; 1999	
De Universiteitsstrijd	NTR	Netherlands	2016	
University Challenge	ABC	Australia	1987–1989	
University Challenge	TVNZ; Prime	New Zealand	1976–1989; 2014–2016	
University Challenge	BBC World	India	2003–2005	
Varsity Quiz Bowl	WYES	New Orleans, Louisiana	1957–1994?	
VIPS Battle of the Books	WYES	Providence, Rhode Island	2005?	
Virgin Islands Quiz Bowl	WTJX	US Virgin Islands	2012	
Whiz Bang Quiz Gang	WWOR	New York City	1992–199?	
Winthrop Challenge	SCETV	South Carolina	1979–?	
Your Turn	Ulster Television	United Kingdom	1960–1961	

=== Quiz bowl in name only ===
Although Channel 4 in the UK broadcast a game show titled Quiz Bowl for one series in 1991–92, this was not a quiz bowl per se, but rather a quiz designed to reflect the flow and scoring of the sport of American football.
