= Robert Jeffrey =

Singer, actor, director, producer, and writer

Robert Latham Jeffrey
- Born: Robert Latham Jeffrey; May 3, 1934; Winnipeg, Manitoba, Canada
- Died: September 17, 2004 (aged 76); Toronto, Ontario, Canada
- Occupation: Entertainer

Robert Latham Jeffrey (May 3, 1934 – September 17, 2004) was a Canadian singer, actor, director, producer and writer. He was known for his tenor range and lively interpretations for concert and musical stage.

== Early life ==
Robert Latham Jeffrey was born on May 3, 1934, in Winnipeg's North Kildonan neighbourhood, in Manitoba, to parents William & Nellie Jeffrey. He was the first born, later joined by two brothers; Donald and Martin. It seemed that Robert (Bob) Jeffrey had always been interested in singing. His vocal talent was appreciated at an early age when the eight-year-old Jeffrey was appointed head chorister at St. John's Cathedral in Winnipeg. His singing led to juvenile guest spots on CBC radio's "Sunday School of the Air."

By the time his voice changed and he was an up-and-coming tenor, the new medium of television had come to Winnipeg. Robert became a regular on CBC variety shows broadcast from his home town.

== Emerging vocal artist: the 1950s ==
In his late teen years he began a stage career with Winnipeg's new Rainbow Stage summer theatre company, performing in "Guys and Dolls", "Annie Get Your Gun" and taking the role of Lieutenant Cable in "South Pacific".

Then in 1957 Ettore Mazzoleni heard him sing at the Manitoba Music Festival and a scholarship sent him to The Royal Conservatory of Music in Toronto. While studying at the conservatory, Jeffrey took the tenor role in the Canadian premiere of Michael Tippett's "A Child of Our Time", under Mazzoleni's direction, at the University of Toronto's Convocation Hall. He also undertook classical repertoire with choirs throughout Ontario, including the tenor roles in Handel's "Messiah" and Mendelssohn's "Elija", in Sudbury. In 1958 he won the Kiwanis Music Festival Award in the 'Male Lieder' category, for a performance at Eaton Auditorium.

In the late 1960s, he was cantor at St. Thomas's Anglican Church (Toronto), under the direction of Walter MacNutt. At this time he also researched a CBC radio programme on religious music, under the direction of Brian Freeland. Jeffrey's last appearance on the concert stage was in a 1994 production of "Amahl and the Night Visitors" for music director Lloyd Bradshaw at St. Anne's Anglican Church in Toronto.

== 1960s and 70s: international stage ==
In 1960 he was invited to join the Stratford Shakespeare Festival production of "H.M.S. Pinafore", under the direction of Sir Tyrone Guthrie, as chorus and understudy to the leading role. Guthrie recognized an emerging acting presence and encouraged the singer's interest in the musical stage. Pinafore was a great success in Stratford and was transferred to New York for a limited engagement at the Phoenix Theatre. Jeffrey was back in Stratford in 1961 for the Guthrie production of "Pirates of Penzance". This was another success with a return to New York and a three-month U.S. tour.

These U.S. visits exposed the singer to American audiences. Mr. Jeffrey was highlighted during the Pinafore run at New York's Phoenix Theatre as 'One to Watch' in Dan Blum's noted "Theatre World" publication.

"H.M.S. Pinafore" then went on to London in 1962 for a Command Performance before Queen Elizabeth II at Her Majesty's Theatre.

While in the British capital, Robert Jeffrey was offered the role of Tony in H. M. Tennent's Scandinavian tour of "West Side Story". He replaced David Holliday in Copenhagen and went on to plaudits, opposite Jill Martin as Maria, in Oslo, Goteborg, Stockholm and Helsinki.

In 1963, back in London, he appeared in the new musical "House of Cards", at the Players' Theatre.

Returning to Toronto in 1964, he appeared as Mr. Ringo in one of the early productions of Susan Douglas Rubeš' Young People's Theatre, "The Dandy Lion". This was his second stage appearance in the city. He had previously starred in a new Bernard Slade musical "The Gay Chaperone" (The Duenna) at Toronto's Crest Theatre in January 1961.

In 1968 Jeffrey joined a roster of Canadian musical comedy stars (including Jack Creley and Rita Howell) in the annual touring revue "Spring Thaw," established him as a stage presence across the country for the next three years (1968, 69, 70). These tours led to a return to Winnipeg's Rainbow Stage for two seasons, in "Finian's Rainbow" (1964) with Burt Wheeler and "Mame" (1972), in the role of Patrick Dennis, with Libby Morris.

In the summer of 1968 Jeffrey landed a role in the Toronto production of "Your Own Thing" at the Bayview Playhouse. In November he was back on that stage as one of the quartet of performers for the Canadian premiere of "Jacques Brel is Alive and Well and Living in Paris" (with Stan Porter, Arlene Meadows and Loro Farrell). The successful run of this production led to an invitation to open in the show in Boston with Arlene Meadows, Robert Guillaume and Judy Lander, at the Charles Playhouse. Jeffrey remained in Boston for two years, joined in the Brel show by such artists as Denise LeBrun, Sally Cooke, George Ball and Shawn Elliott. He went on to join productions in Montreal (at Place des Arts), Ottawa (in the recently opened National Arts Centre) and Philadelphia (with Elly Stone), with a return to Boston in 1981. In 1972 he joined the large cast of Brel interpreters in a Carnegie Hall fifth anniversary presentation of the hit show, a "Homage a Jacques", with the celebrated Jacques Brel in attendance.

On his return to Toronto from Boston in 1973, Jeffrey continued in the world of cabaret inspired by the Brel show. "Of Moon & June & Honeymoon," a song revue which Jeffrey co-devised with director Ron Ror, set to music by Doug Randle, opened at Old Angelo’s cabaret on Elm Street with a cast of Christine Chandler, Brian McKay and Barbara Barsky. The show was re-packaged for Cleveland in August and opened Hamilton's new Hamilton Place Theatre in September.

At the end of the Toronto run, artistic director Michael Ayoub saw the show and invited the production to open his Muskoka Festival (re-staged by Bernard Hiatt), based in Gravenhurst, Ontario, that summer.

His arrival in Muskoka in 1973 led to a long-term affiliation with that company which included roles in Muskoka Festival productions of Dames at Sea, Flicks, I Do! I Do!(1974) with Jamie Ray, and Eight to the Bar (1979) with Nancy Palk. In 1983 he directed Michael Burgess and Kate Hennig in Side by Side by Sondheim. In 1984 he co-directed (with Paul Russell) a workshop production of a new Adamo and O'Donnell musical, Robin for Good. The following year saw a fully staged production with Marianne Woods, Jonathan Whittaker and James Fagan Tait.

In 1972 he played Sancho Panza in Heinar Piller's Grand Theatre (London, Ontario) production of "Man of La Mancha"(with Michael Fletcher and Denise Ferguson). He also directed a production of "Jacques Brel is Alive and Well and Living in Paris" for The Playhouse (Fredericton). This led to directing (and performing in) another revival of the show for Marlene Smith and Strut Productions, at the Teller's Cage in Toronto (1975).

The 1970s were the years of cabaret in Toronto, and across Canada. Jeffrey was booked solid. After "Moon & June" in Toronto, he was invited to be part of Roderick Cook "One More Time"(1974) with Connie Martin and David Brown at the Colonial Tavern. This was followed by "In Gay Company" with Susan Keller at the Teller's Cage (1975).

In 1976 Jeffrey appeared in David Y.H. Lui's Vancouver production of Ben Bagley's "The Decline and Fall of the Entire World as Seen through the Eyes of Cole Porter" with Ross Petty and Roma Hearn.

Back in Toronto in 1977 he directed and appeared in another revival of "Jacques Brel," with Barbara Collier, Nora McClellan and Rudy Webb, at the Bayview Playhouse. This production continued with an extended run at the city's Prince Hotel followed by performances at the Sly Fox Cabaret in Ottawa. In 1980 he directed "To Eternity through Noise & Smoke" for Magda Zalan's Podium Productions, which featured Nancy Palk, Sean Hewitt, Marcia Tratt and Joe Zeigler, at Toronto's St. Lawrence Centre for the Arts.

In 1979 Tony Lloyd, artistic director of Theatre Sudbury invited Jeffrey to direct Peter Mews, Marylu Moyer and Pam Hyatt in "Anne of Green Gables: The Musical"(1980). He had previously appeared in Sudbury in classical concerts and as Mack the Knife in "The Threepenny Opera" (1972) and was delighted to return. This directorial project was followed by Theatre Sudbury roles in 1982 productions of "Oliver!" (Mr. Bumble) and "The Sound of Music" (Max). This was followed in 1983 with the title role in "You're a Good Man, Charlie Brown", with Grant Cowan and Marcia Tratt. In 1984 he appeared in "Flicks" and in 1986 he was Captain Andy in "Show Boat".

In the early eighties, he also returned to productions for Toronto's Young Peoples Theatre, where he had earlier success in "The Dandy Lion." He played a lively Tigger in 1973's "Winnie the Pooh" with Don Francks as Pooh, at the St. Lawrence Centre. In 1980 he was offered the title role in "The Popcorn Man" and in the next year returned for "The Threepenny Opera" with Salome Bey (1981). These last two productions were at Young People's Theatre's new venue on Toronto's Front Street.

Mr. Jeffrey's last stage appearance was in the Ontario Tour of Walter Learning and Alden Nowlan's "A Gift to Last" (1991).

== Television ==
Robert Jeffrey had been introduced to television in the 1950s in Winnipeg, as soon as the Winnipeg studios of CBC opened.

After 1958, during his Toronto studies, he appeared on CBC's "Hit Parade", with Robert Goulet and Giselle Mackenzie, recorded at the CBC Jarvis Street studios. Both of Guthrie's Gilbert and Sullivan productions for Stratford Festival had been adapted for television by Norman Campbell, in 1960 and 61.

When Jeffrey returned from Europe in 1964, he was interviewed by Fred Rogers for his new CBC children's show and made appearances on the new "Mister Rogers' Neighborhood". He followed this with guest spots on "Butternut Square" and then on Ernie Coombs' "Mr. Dressup." In 1972 he was invited to appear on several episodes of TVOntario's "Polka Dot Door."

He was frequently cast on variety shows such as "Music Album" and there were several appearances on Elwood Glover's Luncheon Date during the 1970s. In 1979 he undertook the title role of Dodi Robb and Pat Patterson's "The Popcorn Man" in a CBC children's music special. This led to repeating the role on stage.

== Later years and legacy ==
In his later years, passing the spotlight to the next generation, Robert Jeffrey joined with Sandy Stewart (producer), Pat Stewart and Paul G. Russell (1985) to adapt the classic television quiz show Reach for the Top for in-school play as "Schoolreach." Reach for the Top had launched the career of Jeopardy!'s Alex Trebek years before. Reach was privately produced by Sandy Stewart from 1985 to 1996.

In 1996, Jeffrey and Russell, as Paulus Productions Inc., acquired Reach for the Top. In the year 2000, they re-established "Reach" on television, first with Canadian Learning Television, then with Access TV (now CTV Two Alberta), Knowledge Network and TVOntario. The Reach Organization (Reach for the Top and Schoolreach) continues to sponsor student co-curricular play in the format made popular on television, across Canada.

To honour the 50th anniversary of the National Finals of Reach for the Top (2016), the estate of Robert Jeffrey contributed to the establishment of the Reach for the Top Foundation, offering cash awards to celebrate student achievement.

In the 1990s, Robert Jeffrey, through Paulus Productions Inc., was a founding member of PFG (the Paulus Film Group), which nurtured a younger generation of Canadian filmmakers whose output included feature films and award-winning videos for broadcast on the Bravo (Canada) network. Besides Jeffrey, PFG was made up of Daniel Hill, Robert Crossman, Drew Mullin, David Greene, Aaron Woodley and Paul G. Russell.

Robert Jeffrey served as executive producer on a number of these projects and was often cast in cameo roles by the directors. Several PFG films, such as "Bed & Breakfast," won recognition at film festivals in Atlanta, Columbus, Houston, Los Angeles, Palm Springs, Chicago and Toronto.

Robert died of heart failure at his home in Toronto, on September 17, 2004. His archive is at the University of Guelph.
