= List of academic knowledge competitions =

The following is a list of games and competitions that test knowledge about primarily academic subjects.

- Quiz bowl
- Knowledge Bowl
- National History Bee and Bowl
- Reach for the Top
- College Bowl
- Academic Decathlon
- National Tournament of Academic Excellence (NTAE)

== See also ==
- List of televised quiz bowl programs
