= Trevor Scott =

American football player (born 1984)

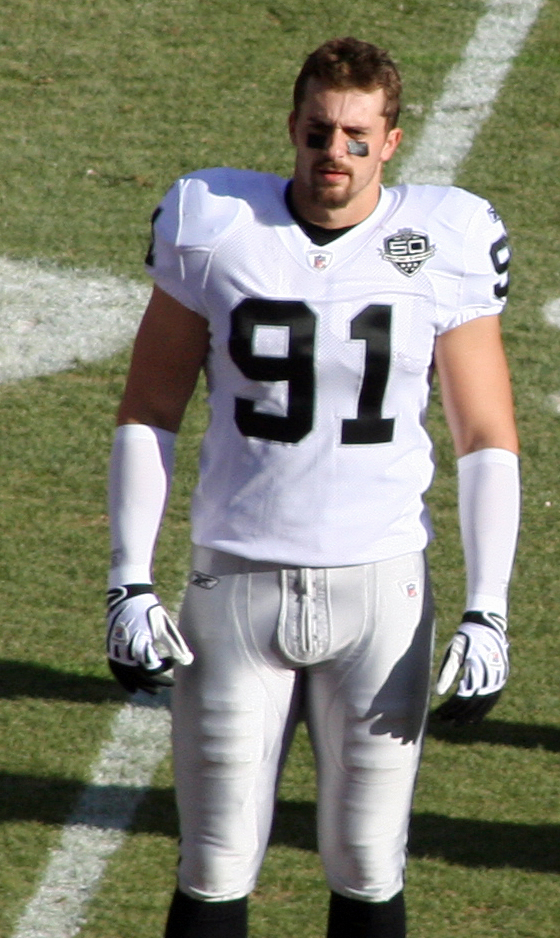
- Scott in 2009

No. 91, 99, 71, 76
- Position: Defensive end

Personal information
- Born: August 30, 1984 (age 42); Potsdam, New York, U.S.
- Listed height: 6 ft 5 in (1.96 m)
- Listed weight: 260 lb (118 kg)

Career information
- High school: Potsdam
- College: University at Buffalo (2004–2007)
- NFL draft: 2008: 6th round, 169th overall pick

Career history
- Oakland Raiders (2008−2011); New England Patriots (2012); Tampa Bay Buccaneers (2013); Chicago Bears (2014)

Awards and highlights
- First-team All-MAC (2007)

Career NFL statistics
- Total tackles: 116
- Sacks: 16.5
- Forced fumbles: 2
- Stats at Pro Football Reference

Trevor John Scott (born August 30, 1984) is an American former professional football player who was a defensive end in the National Football League (NFL). He played college football for the Buffalo Bulls and was selected by the Oakland Raiders in the sixth round of the 2008 NFL draft.

== Early life ==
Scott was twice an All-Northern selection at Potsdam High School playing tight end and outside linebacker. He earned two letters and was twice a captain and was team MVP as both a junior and senior and was a Watertown Daily Times First-team selection. He also earned four letters in track and field and two in basketball.

== College career ==
At the University at Buffalo, Scott was an All-Conference selection as a senior he started all 12 games at left end for the Bulls.

== Professional career ==
=== Oakland Raiders ===
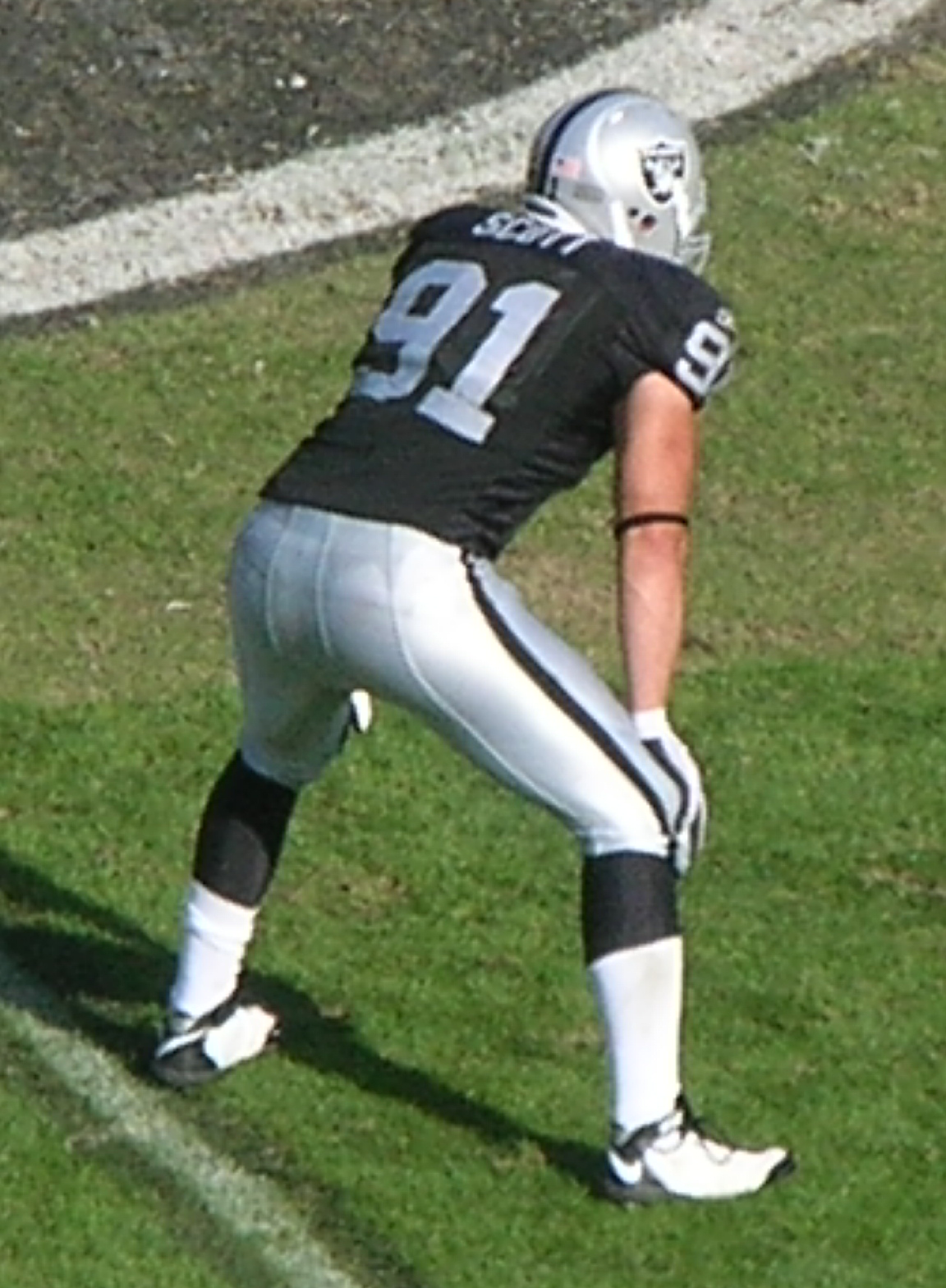
Scott in November 2008

He was a sixth round pick (169th overall) in the 2008 NFL draft. Scott recorded his first and second career NFL sack on October 19, 2008, when he brought down Brett Favre. That performance earned him a nomination for the NFL Rookie of the Week award, but the award was given to Chris Johnson. Scott finished the 2008 season with 24 tackles, a forced fumble, and tied two others for the most sacks by a rookie with 5.0.

On, November 25, 2010, Scott was placed on injured reserve by the Raiders, due to an injured anterior cruciate ligament in his left knee, ending his season after 10 games, 22 tackles, and 1.5 sacks. He played in all 16 games the following season.

=== New England Patriots ===
Scott signed with the New England Patriots on March 17, 2012. Played the 2012 season with the New England Patriots and recorded 3 sacks, 5 tackles, and a forced fumble.

=== Tampa Bay Buccaneers ===
Scott signed with the Tampa Bay Buccaneers on August 20, 2013.

=== Chicago Bears ===
Scott was signed by the Chicago Bears on March 6, 2014.

== NFL career statistics ==
Legend
**Bold**	Career high

=== Regular season ===
Year	Team	Games		Tackles					Interceptions					Fumbles			
Year	Team	GP	GS	Cmb	Solo	Ast	Sck	TFL	Int	Yds	TD	Lng	PD	FF	FR	Yds	TD
2008	OAK	**16**	0	24	19	5	5.0	6	0	0	0	0	0	**1**	0	0	0
2009	OAK	**16**	6	**43**	**38**	5	**7.0**	**11**	0	0	0	0	0	0	0	0	0
2010	OAK	10	**10**	23	14	**9**	1.5	1	0	0	0	0	**1**	0	0	0	0
2011	OAK	**16**	0	7	6	1	0.0	1	0	0	0	0	0	0	0	0	0
2012	NWE	14	2	14	7	7	3.0	2	0	0	0	0	0	**1**	0	0	0
2013	TAM	4	0	3	2	1	0.0	0	0	0	0	0	0	0	0	0	0
2014	CHI	9	0	2	1	1	0.0	0	0	0	0	0	0	0	0	0	0
		85	18	116	87	29	16.5	21	0	0	0	0	1	2	0	0	0

=== Playoffs ===
Year	Team	Games		Tackles					Interceptions					Fumbles			
Year	Team	GP	GS	Cmb	Solo	Ast	Sck	TFL	Int	Yds	TD	Lng	PD	FF	FR	Yds	TD
2012	NWE	**2**	0	**1**	**1**	0	0.0	0	0	0	0	0	0	0	0	0	0
		2	0	1	1	0	0.0	0	0	0	0	0	0	0	0	0	0

== Personal life ==
Scott is married to Dana Scott. They have a son named Jack Christopher Scott, who was born in November of 2014.
