= High Q =

Quiz show

High Q is the name of various local television student quiz shows broadcast throughout the United States. While the formats vary, all featured two or three teams representing high schools from the station's coverage area, which would compete against each other by answering questions over subjects taught in school. Similar shows have been produced by many local stations under other names.

== Known programs ==
- KD QUIZ, broadcast by KDKA-TV in Pittsburgh, Pennsylvania.
- A long-running version by WAVE-TV in Louisville, Kentucky. Its format was licensed by and nearly identical to the NBC show GE College Bowl. This show is no longer produced; its sponsor, Ashland Oil, now sponsors Kentucky's Governors Cup academic competition. A similar game called High School Bowl has since replaced High Q.
- WDKY-TV/FOX 56 in Lexington, Kentucky is currently on their second season of their version of the show, titled "Home Team Hi-Q." in partnership with the Kentucky Association for Academic Competition, a local quizbowl league. The version airs on their TV and on the YouTube channel.
- A long-running version was produced in the 1980s and early 1990s by WOWK in Huntington, West Virginia. This version was hosted by local radio personality Ernie G. Anderson. A revamped version, called "The All New High Q", began in 2009. The revamped version is a slightly different format from the original but is still hosted by Anderson and is being produced at the Ohio University Southern Campus in Ironton, Ohio. This version airs on both CW-affiliate WQCW-TV on Saturday afternoons and OUSC's Public-access television cable TV channel.
- High-Q was Produced for a number of years by WCVB-TV 5 in Boston, Massachusetts. Sports Anchor Mike Lynch was the host of this version. In its last season, the championship was won by Wahconah Regional High School in western Massachusetts, far from the station's advertising base.
- A version produced by WHIO-TV in Dayton, Ohio. This version features a unique format, not seen in any other show.
- A version from WSB-TV in Atlanta, Georgia. Its format appears to be similar, though not identical to the WHIO version. Meteorologist Katie Walls is the host of the WSB version. Both WHIO and WSB are both owned by the Cox Media Group.
- A version from KCOS in El Paso, Texas had been hosted by Sara Lindstrom for the past 5 years. It is now hosted by Dr. Richard Pineda of the University of Texas at El Paso. The show is in its 35th season on air in El Paso starting in October 2018. Show airs weekly on Thursdays at 8:00 p.m. with a repeat on Saturdays at 11:30 a.m.
- A version from WIBW-TV in Topeka, Kansas, cosponsored with Washburn University was broadcast from 1985 to 2005. In 2005 the format changed and program was renamed Quest and is now broadcast on KTWU-TV.
- A long-running version by KGW-TV in Portland, Oregon was broadcast in the 1960s and 1970s.

== See also ==
- List of televised quiz bowl programs
