= Frontenac Secondary School =

Location
- 1789 Bath Road; Kingston, Ontario, K7M 4Y3; Canada; 44.2372°N 76.5770°W

Information
- School type: Public, Secondary
- Motto: Latin: Ad Optima Nitamur
- Founded: 1956; 70 years ago
- School board: Limestone District School Board
- Superintendent: Richard Holmes
- Area trustee: George Beavis
- School number: 911135
- President: Sam Coffey and Kerry Readwin
- Principal: Shannon Tyner
- Grades: 9–12
- Enrollment: 1,106 (September 2011)
- Language: English
- Area: Auden Park
- Campus type: Suburban
- Colours: Grey; Garnet
- Mascot: Freddy the Falcon
- Team name: Falcons
- Affiliations: KASSAA, EOSSAA, OFSAA
- Website: hcss.alcdsb.on.ca

Frontenac Secondary School is a high school in the west end of Kingston, Ontario, Canada. The Limestone District School Board operates it. The team plays under the nickname "Frontenac Falcons".

== History ==
Frontenac Secondary School was founded in 1957 as Collins Bay High School and adopted its current name in 1964. In 2006, construction began on a major extension, which includes a new library, a media room, an elevator, and several additional computer labs and classrooms.

== Programs ==
Frontenac has junior and senior teams that compete in the Canadian game show Reach for the Top. In 1998–99, the senior team was the national champion. The team had qualified for the American game show Whiz Quiz. In 2007 and 2008, the senior REACH team was the international Whiz Quiz champions, and in 2006, 2007, and 2025 they attended the provincial REACH Championships.

== Notable alumni ==
- Rob Bagg, former CFL player
- Wayne Cashman, former NHL ice hockey player and head coach.
- Taylor Hall, NHL hockey player and number 1 draft pick in the 2010 NHL entry draft
- Dee Sterling, former CFL player
- John Tripp, professional ice hockey coach and former player.
- Dylan Wykes, long-distance runner, qualified for the marathon in the 2012 Summer Olympics in London.
- Rick Smith, retired professional hockey player for the Boston Bruins
- Amanda Leveille, former professional hockey player, two-time Isobel Cup champion, and NWHL all-time record holder in wins
- Aaliyah Edwards, WNBA basketball player

== See also ==
- Education in Ontario
- List of secondary schools in Ontario
