= Génies en herbe =

Canadian quiz show

Génies en herbe (Budding Geniuses) is a Radio-Canada television program in which students representing their école secondaire (Quebec high schools) participated in trivia tournaments. Tournaments also took place in French-speaking communities outside Quebec, such as Saint Boniface, Manitoba. Reach for the Top is an English Canadian equivalent. It was the French Canadian equivalent to the American game show It's Academic.

After the end of the television series, the tournaments continued under the aegis of several regional school organizations.

In January 2011, the show was started once more on Radio-Canada in a pan-Canadian format. This newer version was called "Génies en herbe: l'aventure" ("Budding Geniuses: Adventure") in which four teams travel around Canada to discover seven different cities. The quiz was then heavily oriented on the culture and history of the cities visited in the current episode. The four teams are the Maritimes, Ontario, Quebec and Western Canada.

== Finals ==
These are the finals of the Génies en herbe tournaments, with the victors placed first.

=== 1972-75 ===
- Not available

=== 1975-76 ===
- Polyvalente Monseigneur-Richard (Verdun, now part of Montreal)
- École Secondaire Charlebois (Ottawa)

=== 1976-77 ===
- Collège Notre-Dame (Montreal)
- Polyvalente de Matane (Matane)

=== 1977-78 ===
- Polyvalente de L'Ancienne-Lorette (L'Ancienne-Lorette)
- École secondaire Charlebois (Ottawa)

=== 1978-79 ===
- École secondaire Le Campus (Sainte-Foy, now part of Quebec City; school now called École secondaire de Rochebelle)
- École secondaire J.-H.-Picard (Edmonton, Alberta)

=== 1979-80 ===
- Polyvalente de Matane (Matane)
- École secondaire Le Campus (Sainte-Foy)

=== 1980-81 ===
- Not available

=== 1981-82 ===
- École secondaire Le Campus (Sainte-Foy)
- Polyvalente Paul-Hubert (Rimouski)

=== 1982-83 ===
- École secondaire Le Campus (Sainte-Foy)
- Séminaire Sacré-Cœur (Grenville-sur-la-Rouge)

=== 1983-84 ===
- Polyvalente Louis-J.-Robichaud (Shediac, New Brunswick)
- Collège Saint-Maurice (Saint-Hyacinthe)

=== 1984-85 ===
- Polyvalente Mathieu-Martin (Dieppe, New Brunswick)
- Collège Saint-Charles-Garnier (Quebec City)

=== 1985-86 ===
- Polyvalente de Grande-Rivière (Grande-Rivière)
- Collège Saint-Charles-Garnier (Quebec City)

=== 1986-87 ===
- Collège Saint-Charles-Garnier (Quebec City)
- Collège des Eudistes (Montreal, now called Collège Jean-Eudes)

=== 1987-88 ===
- Collège Saint-Charles-Garnier (Quebec City)
- École secondaire Antoine-Brossard (Brossard)

=== 1988-89 ===
- Collège Saint-Charles-Garnier (Quebec City)
- Polyvalente Paul-Hubert (Rimouski)

=== 1989-90 ===
- Institut Keranna (Trois-Rivières)
- Collège de Lévis (Lévis)

=== 1990-91 ===
- Collège Saint-Charles-Garnier (Quebec City)
- Séminaire Saint-Joseph (Trois-Rivières)

=== 1991-92 ===
- Collège Jean-Eudes (Montreal)
- Collège Saint-Charles-Garnier (Quebec City)

=== 1992-93 ===
- Collège Saint-Charles-Garnier (Quebec City)
- Séminaire Saint-Joseph (Trois-Rivières)

=== 1993-94 ===
- Collège Saint-Charles-Garnier (Quebec City)
- Collège Jean-Eudes (Montreal)

=== 1994-95 ===
- Collège Saint-Alexandre (Gatineau)
- Collège Jean-Eudes (Montreal)

=== 1995-96 ===
- Collège Saint-Charles-Garnier (Quebec City)
- École secondaire Marcellin-Champagnat (Saint-Jean-sur-Richelieu)

=== 1996-97 ===
- École secondaire Marcellin-Champagnat (Saint-Jean-sur-Richelieu)
- École secondaire Sophie-Barat (Montreal)

== See also ==
- List of Quebec television series
- Television of Quebec
- Culture of Quebec
- Quebec education system
- Academic games
- Mathcounts
- Quizbowl
