= Whiz Quiz =

- Genre: Game Show, Educational
- Presented by: Mel Busler
- Country of origin: United States
- Original language: English
- No. of seasons: 29

Production
- Producer: Tracy Duflo
- Production location: Watertown, New York
- Running time: 30 minutes (standard play); 60 minutes (championships)

Original release
- Network: WPBS-TV
- Release: 1980

Whiz Quiz is a local TV program produced by WPBS-TV in Watertown, New York. It invites over 30 high-schools from across the North Country to participate in a quizbowl-style tournament. It debuted in 1980, and has been on the air since. The show airs on WPBS Mondays through Thursdays at 7:30 p.m in the months of October and November. The American Championship Game starts at 8:00 p.m. The Championship Match is an hour-long show, with double the amount of questions.

Whiz Quiz was hosted by Glenn Gough, a former sports anchor for WWNY-TV. In the fall of 1979, Glenn joined WPBS as a producer. In 1980, when Whiz Quiz premiered, he was co-host alongside Eddie Carvin. Glenn was on the show from its inception until his retirement in 2018. Glenn was replaced by Jeremy Graves for the 2018 season. Graves was replaced by Joleene DesRosiers for the 2019 season. Mel Busler is the host starting in October 2024.

== Format ==
Whiz Quiz is a knock-out bracket style tournament. A school progressively competes against other schools until that school loses. One loss means elimination from the competition. The team that competes on television consists of four players. However, a school's entire team may have many more alternates and also includes the advisor(s).

The team of four stands behind a booth with four buzzers. In 2007 the booths were painted orange, an endorsement of WPBS's support for Syracuse University. The game lasts for 25 minutes and is divided into four rounds. Correct answers score ten points, Bonus questions score 15. The winner and runner-up of the entire competition receive trophies as well as cash scholarships granted by the Rotary Club.

The Canadian and American Finals as well as the international finals are hour-long games. The first and second International Finals were won by Carthage Central High School (of Carthage, NY, US, led by coach Jennifer Hanno) in 2001 (team members: Justin Rielly, Aaron Kratzat, Dustin Lackey, Joshua Pucci) and 2002 (team members: Justin Rielly, Aaron Kratzat, Nathan Wakefield, Robert Newton, Erik LaLone, Lauren Streeter). The 2024 American champions were Hugh C. Williams High School (of Canton, NY, US, led by coach David Dufrane and consisting of Lexi Stuntz, Sophia Tartaglia, Ciaran O’Brien, David Cheng, and alternates Aurora Casserly and Eliza Creurer). The 2024 Canadian and International champions were Lisgar Collegiate Institute (of Ottawa, ON, Canada, led by coach Ruth Crabtree and consisting of Tristan Scarlett, Jamie Drysdale, Gilbert Cormie-Waters, and Gavin Chiu).

=== Round 1: Smart Start ===
The teams are individually asked questions. The other team cannot answer the question. Five seconds are given to teammates to converse with each other and ring in to give an answer. Around 12 questions are asked in this round. Questions are worth 10 points each.

=== Round 2: One-on-One ===
The players are matched up against corresponding position players on the other team. Chair 1 against chair 1, Chair 2 against Chair 2, etc. Talking with teammates is not allowed in this round. 12 questions are asked in this round; 3 to each chair. Questions are worth 10 points each.

=== Round 3: Know-And-Tell ===
Know-And-Tell is a toss-up round, in which either team can answer. Tossups are worth 10 points each. Conversations with team members are allowed. Some questions have bonuses attached to them. Bonus questions are worth fifteen points and awarded to the team that gets the related question right. This round concludes with a section called four of a kind. Four questions of a common topic are asked.

=== Round 4: Think Fast ===
In this round, wrong answers now yield a free question for the other team that the incorrect team cannot answer. Originally, the rules stated that wrong answers would yield a deduction of points from a team's score. If a tie results at the end of this round, the game continues in a sudden death format. The next team to answer correctly wins. Questions are worth 10 points each.

== Whiz Quiz Canada ==
During December after the conclusion of the American Championship is the airing of Whiz Quiz Canada, a two-week competition involving students from eight schools in the Kingston and Ottawa areas; the rules of the game are the same as the American competition. That series concludes with an hour-long competition between the Canadian and American champions, which airs late in December. Debuting in 2001, the Canadian version generally runs for one week (Monday to Friday), followed by a Canadian championship tournament the following week and the international tournament the night after.

== Participating high schools ==
- Alexandria Bay High School
- Bayridge Secondary School
- Beaver River High School
- Belleville-Henderson High School
- Carthage High School
- Clifton Fine Central School
- Colton-Pierrepont Central School
- Copenhagen Central School
- Edwards Knox Central School
- Franklin Academy
- Frontenac Secondary School
- General Brown High School
- Gouveneur High School
- Harrisville Central School
- Hermon Dekalb Central School
- Heuvelton Central School
- Holy Cross Catholic Secondary School
- Canton High School
- Immaculate Heart Central
- Indian River High School
- LaFargeville Central School
- LaSalle Secondary School
- Lisbon Central School
- Lisgar Collegiate Institute
- Lowville Academy
- Loyalist Collegiate and Vocational Institute
- Lyme Central School
- Madrid-Waddington Central School
- Massena Central High School
- Morristown Central School
- North Addington Education Centre
- Norwood Norfolk Central School
- Ogdensburg Free Academy
- Potsdam High School
- Sackets Harbor Central School
- Saint Lawrence Central School
- Sandy Creek High School
- South Jefferson High School
- South Lewis School
- Sydenham High School
- Thousand Islands Central School
- Watertown High School
