= KYVE Apple Bowl =

Defunct American high school competition

The KYVE Apple Bowl was a televised competition between high school students in Central Washington. Over a period of one to five weeks, 20 to 30 high schools in Central Washington competed at the Apple Bowl studio, located on the Central Washington University campus in Ellensburg, Washington. Co-produced by Central Washington University, the competition aired on the former PBS-affiliate station KYVE in Yakima each spring. The program reached an audience of over 200,000 families in the region.

== Format ==
The single-elimination competition format included lightning, tossup, and bonus rounds. The first and second place team members received checks from Washington Apple Education Foundation, and the two-foot tall traveling Apple Bowl Cup was displayed at the first place school until the next competition season. Seniors on the first, second, and third place teams also won $3,000 or $2,000 tuition waivers for CWU. Many of the teams also participated in Knowledge Bowl and Quiz Bowl.

== History ==
Apple Bowl first began in 1980. The program did not have a regular host. KNDO news anchor Dave Ettl was the longtime host for a stint ending with the 2003 tournament. The 2004 event also brought about other changes, including the relocation of tapings from the KYVE studio in Yakima to Central Washington University and had the team members play standing where previously they sat.

The winning team for the 2012 season was from West Valley High School, the winning school from 2011. Team members received $1500 in personal checks. The runner-up team of Prosser received $500 in checks. Before 2008, first and second place teams received savings bonds from the Washington Apple Education Foundation.

== Winners ==
Year	Winner	Runner-up
2012	West Valley High School	Prosser High School
2011	West Valley High School	Moses Lake High School
2010	Ellensburg High School	Riverside Christian School
2009	Wenatchee High School	Riverside Christian School
2008	Wenatchee High School	Zillah High School
2007	Riverside Christian School	Sunnyside High School
2006	Moses Lake High School	Eastmont High School
2005	Riverside Christian School	
2004	Sunnyside High School	West Valley High School
2003	West Valley High School	Sunnyside High School
2002	Wenatchee High School	Eisenhower High School
2001	Ellensburg High School	Wenatchee High School
2000	Ellensburg High School	Prosser High School
1999	Ellensburg High School	Westside Christian School
1998	Cle Elum/Roslyn High School	Ellensburg High School
1997	Sunnyside High School	
1996	Sunnyside High School	
1995	Wenatchee High School	
1994	Wahluke High School	
1993	Toppenish High School	
1992	Liberty Bell Junior-Senior High School	
1991	Wenatchee High School	
1990	Sunnyside High School	
1989	Grandview High School	
1988	Selah High School	
1987	Naches Valley High School	
1986	Wenatchee High School	
1985	Highland High School	
1984	Ellensburg High School	
1983	Ellensburg High School	
1982	A.C. Davis High School	
1981		
1980	Carroll High School	A.C. Davis High School
