= Colton-Pierrepont Central School =

Location
- 4921 State Highway 56; Colton, New York 13625; United States
- Coordinates: 44°33′28″N 74°56′53″W

Information
- Type: Public
- School district: Colton-Pierrepont Central School District
- Superintendent: Jennifer McKinley
- NCES School ID: 360810000576
- Principal: Emilyann McGregor
- Teaching staff: 35.50 (on an FTE basis)
- Grades: PK-12
- Enrollment: 381 (2023-2024)
- Student to teacher ratio: 10.73
- Campus: Rural: Distant
- Colors: Purple and Gold
- Athletics conference: Section X, East Division
- Mascot: Colts
- Yearbook: Coltonian
- Website: www.cpcs.us

Colton-Pierrepont Central School (CPCS) is a public school in Colton, New York, United States. It consists of grades pre-kindergarten through 12, and enrolls around 390 students.

== Curriculum ==
CPCS offers all levels of the education ladder in one building (elementary, middle, and high school). Studies include the core subjects of English, math, science, and history. CPCS also offers optional creative arts courses including band, chorus, and studio art. The school currently has one foreign language options, Spanish. There is an after-school program, the Foreign Language club. The Foreign Language club has taken annual trips to Montreal, QC, Canada since 2006. In 2009 the club started taking trips to Europe. The club has traveled to England, France, Spain, Italy, the Netherlands and Belgium.

CPCS offers Advanced Placement courses in all the core subjects. These classes are usually sponsored by the College Board and are given AP tests in May that may end up counting for one semester of the class at the college level. There are several "College in High School" courses offered through SUNY Potsdam and Paul Smiths College where students earn college credit.

CPCS also has ties with New York's BOCES program.

== Athletics ==
CPCS has three sports teams (one for each gender makes six in total): soccer, basketball, and lacrosse/softball. In 2007, the school opted to drop the baseball program and replace it with lacrosse. Lacrosse was initially dropped in 2014 but was reinstated in 2023. The teams play in NYS Section X, East Division, which includes about seven other teams.

The 1974 boys' varsity soccer team became the Division II champions and the first champion of the newly formed Northern Athletic Conference when they defeated Ogdensburg Free Academy 3-1 in the Section X championship game to complete a perfect 18-0-0 season.

The 1979 girls' varsity soccer team earned the title of Section 10-7 Class C Girls' Soccer Champions with a perfect 17-0-0 season.

The boys' varsity soccer team won the NYS Section X championship and qualified for states in 2003, 2005, and 2006. In 2006, the boys' soccer team won the New York State class D soccer crown. The boys went on to the Final Four in Oneonta, New York, at the National Soccer Hall of Fame. They advanced to finals on penalty kicks against Laurens Central of Section IV, winning the championship game 1-0 against SS Seward School from Section IX.

== Facts ==
In 2006 Colton-Pierrepont upgraded its facilities by building a new gymnasium, library, lobby, and band room as well as touching up its older parts. The facilities are now in good condition. A new school sign was generously donated by the Colton-Pierrepont Teachers' Association.

Colton is within 15 miles of four colleges: St. Lawrence University, Clarkson University, SUNY Canton, and SUNY Potsdam. All have offered out-of-school activities for students at Colton.

Important trips are the Foreign Language Club trip, the Holocaust trip. Close Up, the Senior Trip, and Project Adventure for 7th graders.
