= Sandy Stewart (producer) =

Andrew "Sandy" Stewart (22 February 1930 – 5 August 1998) was a Canadian television producer and writer. He was the producer of Reach for the Top, a CBC high school quiz show that continues today as an off-air competition.

== Early life and career ==
Sandy Stewart was born in Calgary, and in his childhood moved to Montreal and London, Ontario. His first job was as a technician at London's CFPL radio in 1948. He joined the Canadian Broadcasting Corporation in 1952 with the Toronto outlet, and had a posting in the Northwest Territories. He later moved to television and helped with the production of Razzle Dazzle and The Friendly Giant.

== Reach for the Top ==
Stewart brought Reach for the Top, a televised quiz show for high school students, to a national audience in 1966, bringing teams from Vancouver, Edmonton, Regina, Saskatoon, Winnipeg, Toronto, and Ottawa to Montreal for a national final. When Stewart needed a new host for the show he selected a young CBC announcer named Alex Trebek who later became famous as the host of the long-running Jeopardy!. Stewart produced Reach for the Top until 1985, when it was cancelled by the CBC. He retained some rights to Reach for the Top, however, and continued to run a school-based version until his retirement in 1995. His final year was marred by job action in Ottawa that led Ontario schools to threaten to boycott the tournament if a team from Bell High School was allowed to participate.

== Other pursuits ==
Stewart served as president of the Canadian Science Writers' Association and held regular dinner lectures up until his death in 1998. He wrote Here's Looking at Us, a book about Canadian television. He also wrote a strong criticism of CBC management during cuts to English programming in the 1990s. Author of "A Pictorial History of Radio in Canada" published by Gage Publishing Limited, Toronto, 1975. ISBN 9780771599484
