= Reach for the Top =

Canadian high school quizbowl

- Final moments of an episode of the Montreal version of Reach for the Top, as aired on CBMT-6 in the late 1970s
- Genre: Game show
- Directed by: Paul Russell
- Presented by: Ryan Vickers
- Country of origin: Canada
- Original language: English

Original release
- Network: CBUT (1961–1966); CBC (1966–1985)
- Release: 1961 – 1985
- Release: 2000 – 2010

Reach for the Top (also known simply as Reach) is a Canadian trivia-based academic quiz competition for high school students. In the past, it has also been a game show nationally broadcast on the CBC. Matches are currently aired online through Reach for the Top's official YouTube channel. Teams qualify for national rounds through several stages of non-televised tournaments held at high schools throughout Canada during the year which are known as Schoolreach.

== History ==
The televised Reach for the Top series was first shown on CBC Television affiliate CBUT in Vancouver, British Columbia, in 1961. It was based on the BBC program Top of the Form. In that first year, a team from three high schools in Burnaby, British Columbia — Fred Affleck, Robert French, Lynne Mader and Marilyn Pelzer — defeated every other team and took all the prizes. The first national Reach for the Top tournament took place in 1965, and was won by Vincent Massey Collegiate Institute from Etobicoke, Ontario. The series was filmed at locations across Canada with the national championships held in Montreal, Quebec. In 1968, a joint effort by CBC and BBC led to the short-lived Trans-World Top Team in which teams from the United Kingdom played teams from Canada.

Alex Trebek hosted the Toronto version for several years, and was succeeded by Jan Tennant in 1973. In Vancouver, the show was hosted by Terry Garner (1961–1982). For many years the Edmonton host was Colin MacLean. In Windsor, the show was hosts were Don Daly and Marty Adler. In London, the show was hosted by Mark Lade, with judge Steve Officer. In Montreal, the show was hosted by Bob Cadman and by Marc Coté. Shelagh Rogers, later a host for CBC Radio, was a contestant on the original broadcasts of the show. Bill Guest (Winnipeg) hosted the National Finals on CBC from 1969 to 1985.

The CBC stopped airing Reach for the Top in 1985, but the contest continues to be played under the aegis of Reach for the Top Inc. CFPL-TV, the former CBC affiliate station in London, continued to air local competitions for several years, and hosted the provincial and national competitions. From 2000 to 2008, the national finals were aired by Canadian Learning Television (now OWN: the Oprah Winfrey Network), hosted by Graham Neil of CFRN-TV in Edmonton. In 2009, the national finals were not aired except for the final game, which was filmed in the TVOntario studio. Until 2009, games at the provincial level were broadcast on stations unique to their respective provinces, among them Ontario on TVO with Nicole Stamp of TVOKids (and produced and directed by Sidney M. Cohen), British Columbia with Tamara Stanners on Knowledge, and Alberta with Graham Neil on Access.

In 1985, Reach for the Top Inc., a private company, was established by Sandy Stewart, with agreement from the CBC. Stewart then joined with his wife, Patricia Stewart, in partnership with Robert Jeffrey and Paul Russell of Paulus Productions Inc. to create Schoolreach, an in-school version of Reach for the Top available across Canada by subscription. Schoolreach is organized among the different school boards in Canada, and monthly tournaments are played, culminating in a district final each spring. The winner in each district participates in the provincial finals (which are televised in Ontario), and the provincial winner competes in the national championship.

Reach for the Top Inc. produced a season of programming in Toronto in 1986 and 1987. The Reach for the Top National Finals were revived in 1988. In 1995, Sandy and Pat Stewart retired from Reach For The Top. Reach for the Top and Schoolreach were then taken over by Paulus Productions Inc. under the direction of Paul Russell and Robert Jeffrey.

CBC created a similar program, SmartAsk, which aired for three seasons before being cancelled in 2004. From 1973 to 1997 the CBC's French language network, Radio-Canada, aired a program called Génies en herbe ("Budding Geniuses"), which was the French language equivalent of Reach for the Top. Competitions continued after the cancellation of the program, and teams from other francophone countries around the world often participated.

For the 1990-91 television season, Hamilton, Ontario's CHCH channel 11 broadcast a regional version of Reach for the Top hosted by broadcaster Alan Cross. At the time, Cross was a DJ at CFNY radio, but would later be well known as musicologist and host of his own radio show The Ongoing History of New Music.

Since 2014, the national finals are uploaded to their official YouTube channel.

== Format ==
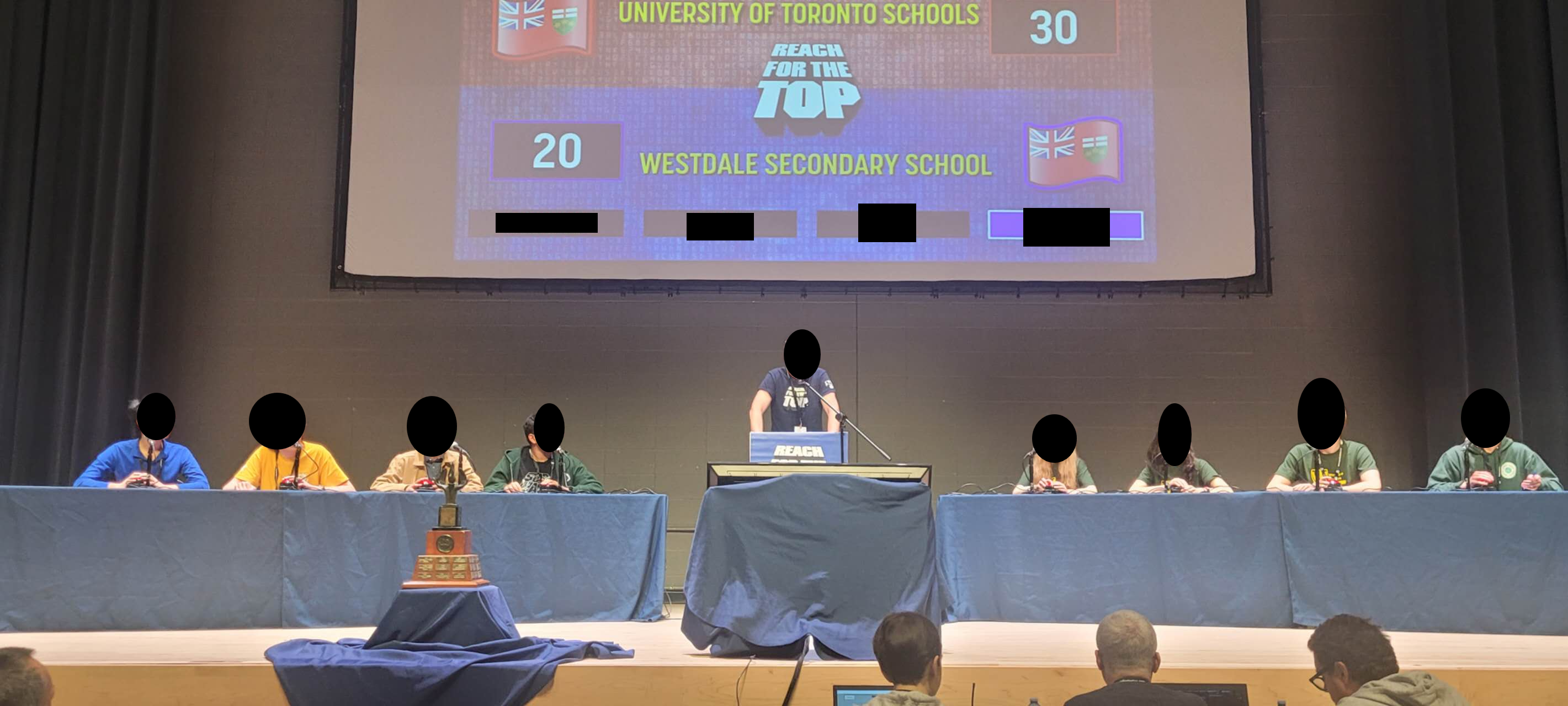
A provincial finals game in Ontario, 2025

Reach questions include "snappers" that open and close each round of gameplay, which can be answered by any of the four players on either team. There are also "Who am I?" or "What am I?" questions and "shootout" questions, also open to any player. "Relay" questions are directed at only one of the teams, and "assigned" questions are directed to a single player. Questions are typically worth ten points, but can be worth up to forty points. Points are not deducted for a wrong answer. If a player on one team answers incorrectly, the question is then open for only players of the opposite team to answer.

Each game lasts for three rounds, with one-minute breaks in between. As of 2009–2010, each game consists of 86 questions, plus four sudden-death tiebreakers in the case of a tie game after regulation. Contestants may answer a question before the reading of it is completed. A correct but anticipated guess does not earn extra points.

The tournament is divided into three different levels. At the regional level, local high school teams compete against each other to determine who goes on to the provincial level. The winners of the provincial championships then go on to the National Reach for the Top tournament. The winning team is then declared the national champions.

Some districts also have "Intermediate" level competitions, where the questions are written with a lower level of difficulty to provide experience to new, younger players. Intermediate level champions do not move on to national finals.

== Types of questions ==
- Snappers: Snappers begin and end every round, and are called "snapstarts" and "snapouts" respectively, and are of miscellaneous category. Four snappers, worth ten points each, begin the first three rounds, and end the first two. To end the third round and the game, there are usually 10-12 snappers worth ten points each. The tiebreaker questions are also snappers.
- Open Questions: These types of questions are open to both teams. Open questions are found in sets of two, three or four, and all relate to the same topic. Each correct answer is worth 10 points, and there is no penalty for a wrong answer. Audio and visual questions follow the same rules. Under the rules of the 2007 and 2008 National tournaments, incorrect answers given before questions in this category were finished resulted in a five-point penalty (a 'neg 5').
- Team Questions: A Team Question is actually a set of questions, worth a possible total of 40 points. When a team question is announced, both teams have an opportunity to answer the first question, called a "scramble". The team that answers the scramble first will have an opportunity to answer the remaining three questions, whereas the opponent will not. In the event that neither team answers the scramble, the remaining questions are open to both teams. In some leagues, the team question is forfeited completely. This is much like the tossup/bonus format played in quizbowl.
- Who/What/Where/What Word am I? Questions: The purpose of a Who/What/Where/What Word am I? question is to guess a person/place/thing/word. Clues are provided by the reader, and are read, one at a time. Between clues, both teams have an opportunity to guess the person/place/thing. If both teams provide incorrect guesses, the next clue will be read. This continues until the fourth and final clue is read. If neither team can provide a correct answer, the answer will be revealed, and no points will be awarded. What Word am I? questions provide up to four quotes with a missing word common to each. If a team provides the correct answer after being provided with one clue, that team will earn 40 points. Each subsequent clue reduces the question's value by 10 points. Unlike a good multi-clued pyramidal quizbowl tossup, the clues in a Who/What/Where/What Word am I? question do not necessarily give one unique answer, and sometimes the 40 point clue can be quite vague, e.g. "I am a European Country that has experienced war".
- Chain Snappers: Chain snappers are similar to snappers, but each question is somehow related to the preceding answer. These are usually found in groups of 6, and can replace a snapper set to end a round.
- Assigned questions: Assigned questions are found in sets of eight—four questions per team. A question is assigned to each person; if the person cannot answer the question correctly, his/her opponent (sitting directly across from him/her) will have an opportunity to answer. Players may not consult with their teammates when they are assigned a question.
- Relay questions: Each team is presented with four questions, one team at a time. The first three questions are worth 10 points each, while the last question is worth 20. If a team provides an incorrect answer at any point in the relay, the remaining questions assigned to that team are forfeited. Consultation is allowed.
- 20-point special: A correct attempt at a 20-point special will earn 20 points. Some 20-point specials require more than one answer while others are a bit more difficult than the regular 10-point questions.
- Shootout questions: Shootouts consist of 12 snappers, and are open to both teams. If a participant provides a correct answer, he/she may not answer any further questions in the shootout. In this way, all four team members must answer a question to complete the shootout. A team will be awarded 40 points if they provide four correct answers before their opponents do. This will end the shootout. If neither team provides four correct responses before the end of the shootout, no points are awarded. Prompting and consultation amongst the players is forbidden. A shootout sometimes replaces a set of snappers to end a round.
- List questions: List questions are open to both teams, and are worth a possible 50 points. The reader will introduce the theme of the question, and ask for five items relating to that theme. For example, if the theme were "Chemical elements", the reader could ask for the first five elements of the periodic table. Teams alternate responses; if one team provides an incorrect response or repeats an answer, then the other team shall have an opportunity to name the remaining items in the list unless they too make a mistake in giving a wrong answer or repeating.

== Eligibility ==
Participants must be "continuously enrolled in a secondary school" to be eligible for participation in Reach for the Top. The age limit restricts participants to those who are 19 or younger at the beginning of the school year. There are no rules about the language of instruction in a school or that a school must be in Canada, but the vast majority of teams come from anglophone schools in provinces with established leagues.

In theory, Quebec colleges, distinct post-secondary institutions, do not meet eligibility requirements. In practice, because the first year of college is mostly equivalent to Grade 12 in other Canadian provinces, these players have been allowed.

== Select teams ==
In 1978, Vincent Massey Collegiate Institute (now separately Michael Power/St. Joseph High School) became the first high school to win the National Championship twice. They played their first game in March 1978 against Richview Collegiate Institute and future Prime Minister of Canada Stephen Harper in the first game of the Etobicoke, Ontario, flight. Vincent Massey Collegiate easily won by a score of 445–160, with Harper scoring 80 points for Richview Collegiate in his first and only appearance on the show. Nicole Stamp, who was the host of Reach For The Top's Ontario Championships from 2004 to 2009, is also an alumna of Richview Collegiate.

In 2003, University of Toronto Schools (UTS), based in Toronto, Ontario, became the first school in Reach for the Top history to win back-to-back national titles. In 2012, it also became the first school to have won the competition three times. UTS then defended its title in 2013 successfully for a record fourth time. In 2018, UTS extended its record to five by defeating London Central Secondary School in the final.

In 2016, Kennebecasis Valley High School in Quispamsis, New Brunswick, defeated Eric Hamber Secondary in Vancouver, British Columbia and became the second school to win three championships, with earlier victories in 2010 and 2011. Lisgar Collegiate Institute in Ottawa, Ontario, became the third three-time winner in 2017, having previously won in 2015 and 2008. St. George's School in Vancouver, British Columbia, became the fourth three-time winner in 2025, having previously won in 1991 and 2004.

Schools that have won the championship twice include Cobequid Educational Centre in Truro, Nova Scotia (1981 and 2005),Saunders Secondary School in London, Ontario (1992 and 1996), Gloucester High School in Ottawa, Ontario (1998 and 2001), London Central Secondary School in London, Ontario (2007 and 2009), and Glebe Collegiate Institute in Ottawa, Ontario (2021 and 2022).

In 1990, the champions from Memorial High School in Sydney Mines, Nova Scotia defeated the National Academic Championship team from Collegiate School of Richmond, Virginia 305–280.

Lorne Jenken High School in Barrhead, Alberta, which won in 1973 and made six other nationals appearances in the 1970s, was considered "the series' most successful competitors" in the 1985 edition of the Canadian Encyclopedia.

St. George's High School in Vancouver, British Columbia, qualified for the national finals every year from 1989 to 2007, except in 1994 when Magee Secondary School represented British Columbia. In 1991, 2004, and 2025 St, George's were the national champions.

== National champions ==
Following is a full list of national champions of Reach for the Top since its inception in 1965, as published on their official website.

Season	Champion	Location
1965–1966	Vincent Massey Collegiate Institute	Etobicoke, Ontario
1966–1967	Rideau Collegiate Institute	Ottawa, Ontario
1967–1968	Oak Bay High School	Victoria, British Columbia
1968–1969	Neil McNeil Catholic Secondary School	Toronto, Ontario
1969–1970	Kelvin High School	Winnipeg, Manitoba
1970–1971	River East Collegiate Institute	Winnipeg, Manitoba
1971–1972	Archbishop O'Leary Catholic High School	Edmonton, Alberta
1972–1973	Lorne Jenken High School	Barrhead, Alberta
1973–1974	Gonzaga Public High School	St. John's, Newfoundland
1974–1975	Queen Elizabeth High School	Halifax, Nova Scotia
1975–1976	Central Peel Secondary School	Brampton, Ontario
1976–1977	Glenlawn Collegiate Institute	Winnipeg, Manitoba
1977–1978	Vincent Massey Collegiate Institute	Etobicoke, Ontario
1978–1979	Banting Memorial High School	Alliston, Ontario
1979–1980	Hillcrest High School	Ottawa, Ontario
1980–1981	Cobequid Educational Centre	Truro, Nova Scotia
1981–1982	Dakota Collegiate Institute	Winnipeg, Manitoba
1982–1983	Roland Michener Secondary School	South Porcupine, Ontario
1983–1984	Deloraine Collegiate Institute	Deloraine, Manitoba
1984–1985	Kate Andrews High School	Coaldale, Alberta
1985–1986	No national tournament held	
1986–1987	No national tournament held	
1987–1988	No national tournament held	
1988–1989	Tagwi Secondary School	Avonmore, Ontario
1989–1990	Memorial High School	Sydney Mines, Nova Scotia
1990–1991	St. George's School	Vancouver, British Columbia
1991–1992	Saunders Secondary School	London, Ontario
1992–1993	St. Joseph's High School	Renfrew, Ontario
1993–1994	Bell High School	Nepean, Ontario
1994–1995	Fredericton High School	Fredericton, New Brunswick
1995–1996	Saunders Secondary School	London, Ontario
1996–1997	Earl Haig Secondary School	Toronto, Ontario
1997–1998	Gloucester High School	Gloucester, Ontario
1998–1999	Frontenac Secondary School	Kingston, Ontario
1999–2000	Merivale High School	Ottawa, Ontario
2000–2001	Gloucester High School	Gloucester, Ontario
2001–2002	University of Toronto Schools	Toronto, Ontario
2002–2003	University of Toronto Schools	Toronto, Ontario
2003–2004	St. George's School	Vancouver, British Columbia
2004–2005	Cobequid Educational Centre	Truro, Nova Scotia
2005–2006	Woburn Collegiate Institute	Toronto, Ontario
2006–2007	London Central Secondary School	London, Ontario
2007–2008	Lisgar Collegiate Institute	Ottawa, Ontario
2008–2009	London Central Secondary School	London, Ontario
2009–2010	Kennebecasis Valley High School	Quispamsis, New Brunswick
2010–2011	Kennebecasis Valley High School	Quispamsis, New Brunswick
2011–2012	University of Toronto Schools	Toronto, Ontario
2012–2013	University of Toronto Schools	Toronto, Ontario
2013–2014	Martingrove Collegiate Institute	Etobicoke, Ontario
2014–2015	Lisgar Collegiate Institute	Ottawa, Ontario
2015–2016	Kennebecasis Valley High School	Quispamsis, New Brunswick
2016–2017	Lisgar Collegiate Institute	Ottawa, Ontario
2017–2018	University of Toronto Schools	Toronto, Ontario
2018–2019	Westmount Secondary School	Hamilton, Ontario
2019–2020	No national tournament held due to the COVID-19 pandemic	
2020–2021	Glebe Collegiate Institute	Ottawa, Ontario
2021–2022	Glebe Collegiate Institute	Ottawa, Ontario
2022–2023	University of Toronto Schools	Toronto, Ontario
2023-2024	University of Toronto Schools	Toronto, Ontario
2024-2025	St. George's School	Vancouver, British Columbia
2025-2026	University of Toronto Schools	Toronto, Ontario

There are national championships held at the elementary or junior level (grades 7/8). There have been 5 of these championships, and 4 have taken place online, but were hosted alongside the senior nationals in 2026. There is spirit award which recognizes the team(s) that show the most spirit. These tournaments are commonly referenced in local papers or Reach for the Top's official Facebook and Instagram account.

Season	Champion	Location	Finalist	Location	Spirit Award	Location
2021-2022	Charles Howitt PS	Richmond Hill, Ontario	Renert School	Alberta	Unknown	Unknown
2022-2023	Webber Academy	Calgary, Alberta	St Mark High School	Manotick, Ontario	Maplehurst MS	Moncton, New Brunswick
2023-2024	Charles Howitt PS	Richmond Hill, Ontario	St Mark High School	Manotick, Ontario	Maplehurst MS, École Lansdowne	Moncton, New Brunswick, Winnipeg, Manitoba
2024-2025	Renert School	Calgary, Alberta	St Mark High School	Manotick, Ontario	Maplehurst MS, St Mark High School	Moncton, New Brunswick, Manotick, Ontario
2025-2026	Renert School	Calgary, Alberta	Gray Academy	Winnipeg, Manitoba	Unknown	Unknown

== Notable alumni, hosts, and coaches ==
- Kim Campbell, former prime minister of Canada
- Lucie Edwards, Canadian diplomat
- Bill Guest, TV host
- Stephen Harper, former prime minister of Canada
- Tom Harrington, Canadian journalist; member of 1974 national champion team
- Bill Hastings, Chief Justice of Kiribati
- Mark McDowell, Canadian diplomat and first resident Ambassador of Canada to the Union of the Republic of Myanmar.
- Shelagh Rogers, Canadian journalist
- Nicole Stamp, Canadian journalist
- Jan Tennant, TV host
- Alex Trebek, TV host
- Chimwemwe Undi, Parliamentary poet laureate of Canada
- Andrew Unger, Canadian author

== In popular culture ==
- The Frantics included a sketch mimicking "Reach For The Top" (as hosted by Jan Tennant) on their CBC Radio program and 1984 debut album, Frantic Times.
- In 1989 CBC Television produced Pray for Me, Paul Henderson about a Reach for the Top team striving to reach the national finals.
- Reach for the Top is mentioned in Miriam Toews's 2004 novel A Complicated Kindness.
- In 2018, Newfoundland author Joan Sullivan published Game, an oral history of Gonzaga High School's 1974 national finals win over Archbishop O'Leary Catholic High School.
- In 2022, Reach for the Top was satirized on The Daily Bonnet.
- The second episode of season 3 of the CBC comedy Son of a Critch is based on the competition.
- In season 3 of Shoresy, a prison version of Reach for the Top is based on the competition.

== See also ==
- List of academic knowledge competitions
- College Bowl, a former American television quiz show for college students
- Academic games
- MathCounts
- SmartAsk, CBC television show that was spun off from Reach
- Schools' Challenge, the UK schools national quiz.
- Génies en herbe, French-language schools quiz on Radio-Canada
- University Challenge, a university student quiz show in the UK
