= KCTS-TV =

Television station in Seattle

- Seattle–Tacoma, Washington; United States
- City: Seattle, Washington
- Channels: Digital: 9 (VHF); Virtual: 9
- Branding: Cascade PBS

Programming
- Affiliations: 9.1: PBS; for others, see § Subchannels

Ownership
- Owner: Cascade Public Media

History
- First air date: December 7, 1954
- Former call signs: KUOW-TV (CP, 1953–1954); KCTS (1954–1959)
- Former channel numbers: Analog: 9 (VHF, 1954–2009); Digital: 41 (UHF, 1999–2009)
- Former affiliations: NET (1954–1970)
- Call sign meaning: Community Television Service

Technical information
- Licensing authority: FCC
- Facility ID: 33749
- ERP: 21.7 kW
- HAAT: 249 m (817 ft)
- Transmitter coordinates: 47°36′57″N 122°18′32″W

Links
- Public license information: Public file; LMS
- Website: www.kcts9.org

KCTS-TV (channel 9), branded Cascade PBS, is a PBS member television station in Seattle, Washington, United States, owned by Cascade Public Media. The station's studios are located at Broadway and Boren Avenue in Seattle's First Hill neighborhood, and its transmitter is located at 18th Avenue and East Madison Street on the city's Capitol Hill.

KCTS-TV is the primary PBS member station for the Seattle–Tacoma market, serving alongside Tacoma-licensed KBTC-TV (channel 28), which is owned by Bates Technical College. KCTS-TV also services parts of British Columbia, Canada.

Originally owned and operated by the University of Washington, KCTS-TV became a community licensee in 1987. In 2015, it was announced that the station would merge with Crosscut.com to form Cascade Public Media.

KYVE (channel 47) in Yakima operates as a semi-satellite of KCTS-TV, serving as the PBS member station for the western portion of the Yakima–Tri-Cities market. KYVE's transmitter is located on Ahtanum Ridge.

== History ==
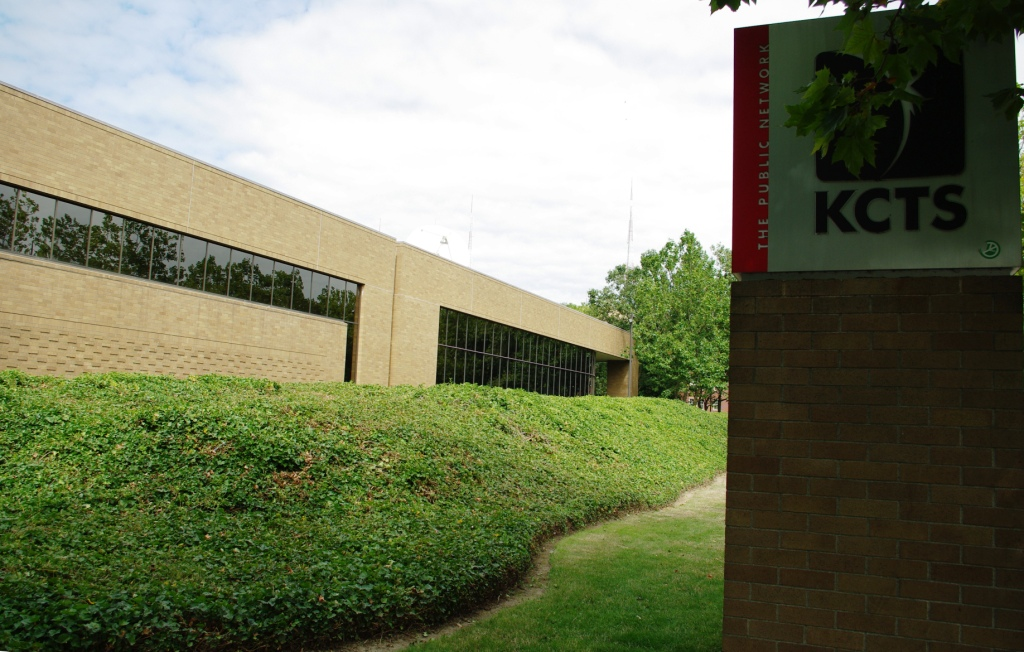
Former studios of KCTS at Seattle Center from 1986 to 2024

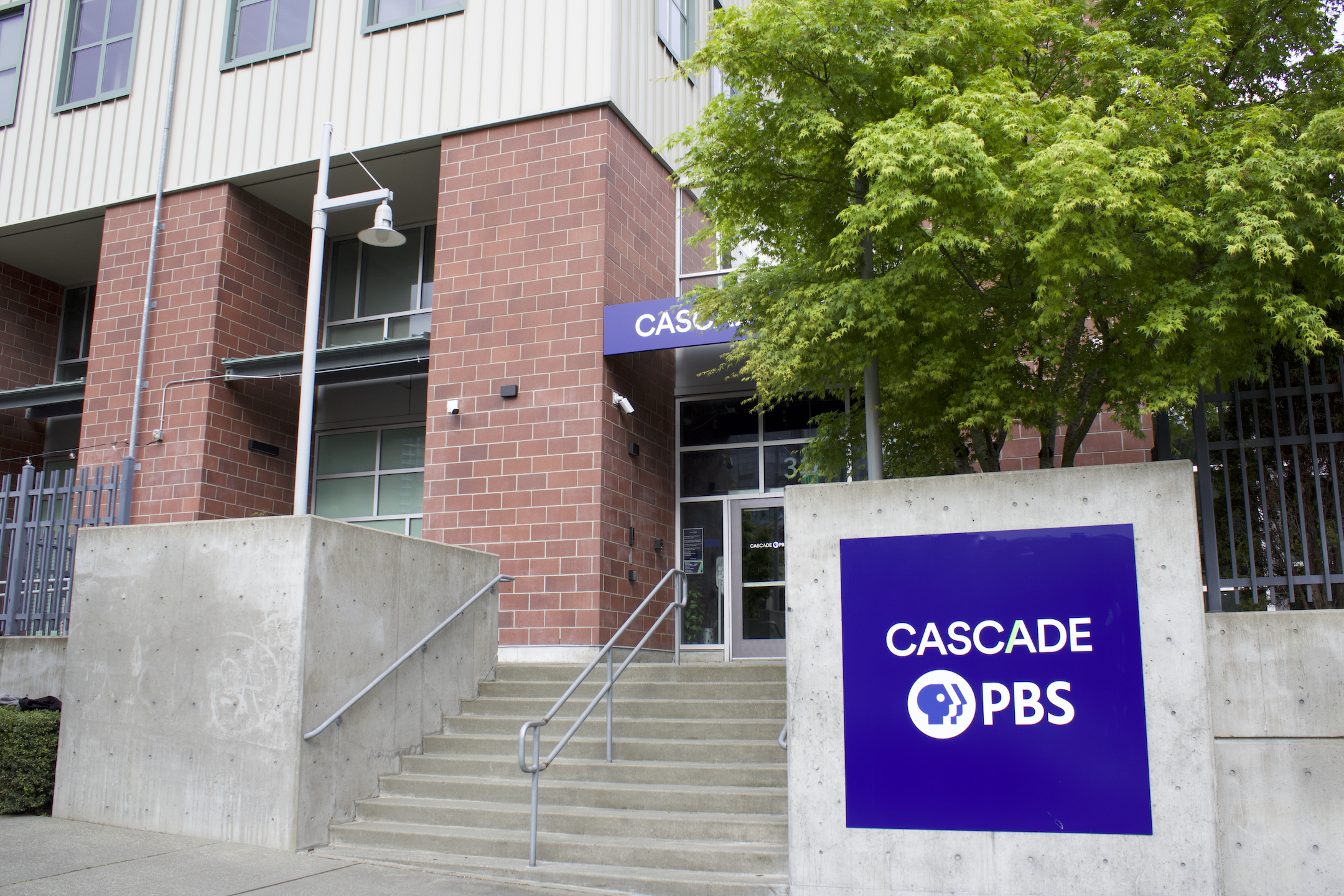
The station's new home in First Hill, to which the combined Cascade PBS relocated in 2023.

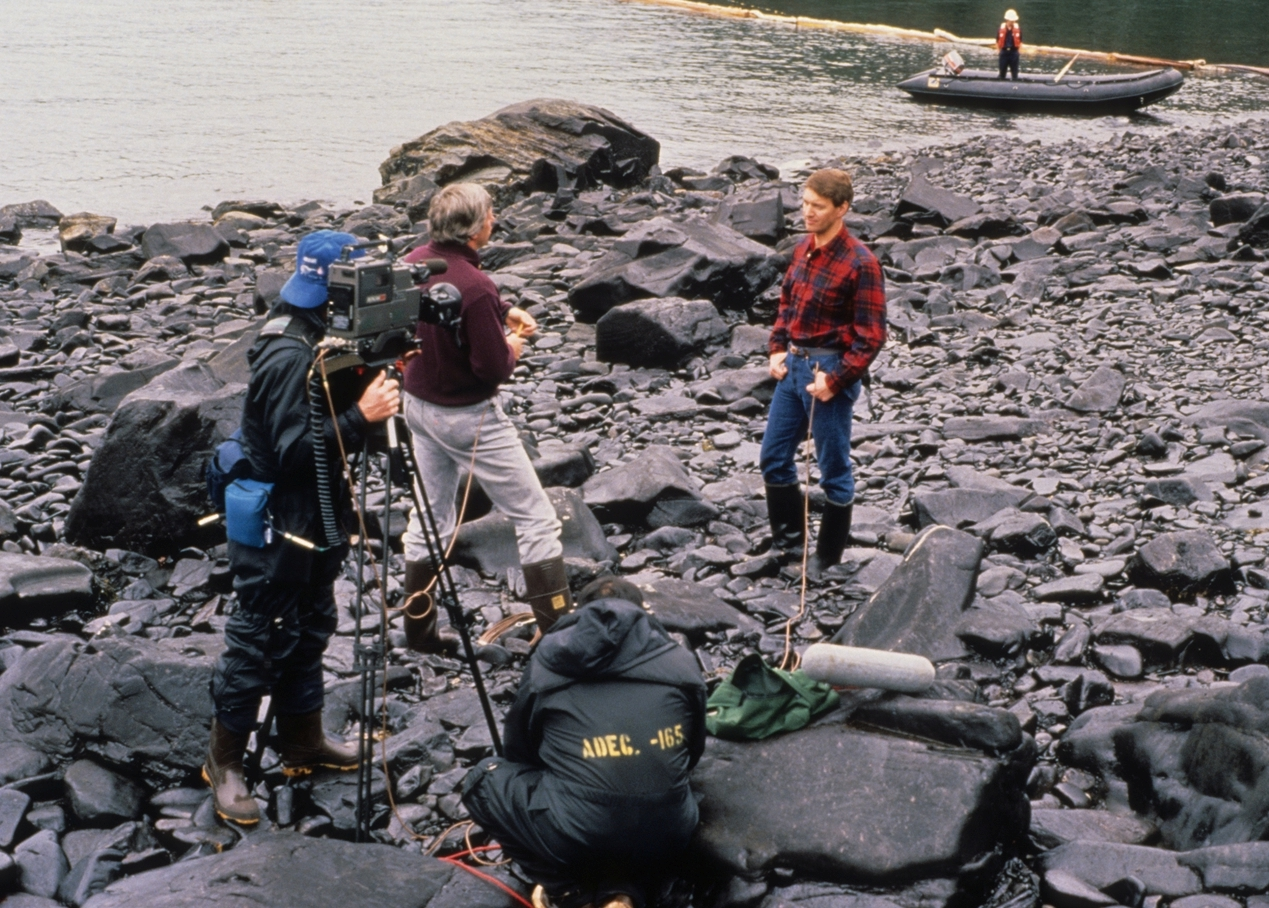
KCTS crew recording an interview with Dennis Kelso, then-commissioner of the Alaska Department of Environmental Conservation, during the cleanup of the Exxon Valdez oil spill in 1989.

KCTS was founded by the University of Washington (UW), the station's original licensee. It was a sister station to KUOW-FM, which UW put on the air in 1951. It was originally to have gone on the air under the callsign KUOW-TV, but it instead assumed the callsign KCTS, meaning Community Television Service, to avoid singling out a member of its initial sponsoring group. Sponsors at the time included UW, Seattle Public Schools, King County Public Schools, Seattle University, Seattle Pacific College, and the Seattle Public Library. A studio for KCTS was set up on the UW campus at 15th Avenue NE and NE Campus Parkway, with equipment donated by KING-TV owner Dorothy Bullitt.

The station aired its first test pattern on November 18, 1954; a fire at its studio the following day caused extensive damage to its equipment, but suppliers expedited shipments of replacement equipment such that they all arrived within a week after the fire, avoiding a potential delay to its planned regular programming. KCTS began broadcasting at 7 p.m. on December 7, first airing a five-minute program preview hosted by UW professor and program director Milo Ryan before switching to an abridged performance of Felix Mendelssohn's Elijah by the Seattle Pacific College Choir. Initially, it aired only two preview programs weekly; however, regular programming did not commence until nearly a month later on January 5, 1955, with the inaugural program featuring Governor Arthur B. Langlie as principal speaker. It had three telecast periods throughout the afternoon and evening during weekdays.

During the 1950s and 1960s, KCTS primarily supplied classroom instructional programs used in Washington State's K–12 schools, plus National Educational Television (NET) programs. Outside of schoolrooms, KCTS's audience among the general public was somewhat limited, and most programming was in black-and-white until the mid-1970s (although the station did install color capability in 1967). In 1970, NET was absorbed into the newly created Public Broadcasting Service (PBS), which commenced broadcasting on October 5. As a PBS member station, KCTS began offering a vastly enhanced scope of programming for the general public, including British programming.

Thanks to a major fundraising drive during the mid-1980s, KCTS moved to new studio space on the Seattle Center campus in October 1986 and would remain there until 2024. In 1987, UW spun off KCTS, and the station became a community licensee, thus separating it from KUOW-FM.

KCTS is seen throughout southwestern British Columbia on local cable systems, as well as across Canada on the Bell Satellite TV and Shaw Direct satellite providers, as well as on many other Canadian cable TV systems. By 1996, a third of KCTS's audience resided in British Columbia; after it was removed from its channel number (9) on basic cable systems in the province, donations declined by $1.2 million. KCTS continues to receive financial support from its Canadian audience, which was processed through the Pacific Coast Public Television Association from 1987 until its dissolution in 2017 amid a crackdown on similar charities from the Canada Revenue Agency.

KCTS switched to a digital transmission signal from its Capitol Hill tower in March 1999, becoming the third television station in the Seattle area to make the transition. The station had been an early adopter of high-definition television programming and used its new digital signal to simulcast several programs. In January 2016, as part of a broader strategy to redefine itself as a content provider for various platforms other than television, the name of the licensee, KCTS Television became Cascade Public Media; its properties included KCTS-TV, Crosscut, a non-profit daily news site, and Spark Public. Cascade Public Media currently consists of KCTS, Crosscut and Piranha Partners.

In July 2022, Cascade Public Media purchased Childhaven's longtime facility in First Hill for $23 million and announced that it would move its operations there by the end of 2023; the organization stated on its website that the city of Seattle declined to renew the 40-year ground lease for the Seattle Center facility. It retained architectural firm JPC Architects, general contractor Abbott Construction, and project manager OAC Services as part of a capital campaign to purchase and renovate the property.

In October 2023, KCTS announced that it and Crosscut would merge under the new unified brand of Cascade PBS. It also announced plans for a new streaming app, expanding on a service that launched in 2020, that would be used by other PBS member stations. KCTS and Crosscut moved into the First Hill facility in January 2024, with both subsequently adopting the Cascade PBS name on March 1.

After the Rescissions Act of 2025 was passed, Cascade PBS lost $3.5 million in annual federal funding and laid off 17 staffers as a result.

== KYVE history ==
KYVE
Satellite of KCTS-TV
- Yakima, Washington; United States
- Channels: Digital: 21 (UHF); Virtual: 47

Programming
- Affiliations: 47.1: PBS; for others, see § Subchannels

History
- First air date: November 1, 1962
- Former call signs: KYVE-TV (1962–1985)
- Former channel numbers: Analog: 47 (UHF, 1962–2009)
- Former affiliations: NET (1962–1970)
- Call sign meaning: Yakima Valley Educational

Technical information
- Licensing authority: FCC
- Facility ID: 33752
- ERP: 50 kW
- HAAT: 280 m (919 ft)
- Transmitter coordinates: 46°31′57.5″N 120°30′37.2″W
- Translator(s): see § KYVE translators

Links
- Public license information: Public file; LMS
- Website: www.kcts9.org/about/kyve47

In 1994, KCTS merged with KYVE, which has served central Washington since November 1, 1962. However, this was not the first time that the two stations had partnered together; during the early 1960s KYVE's engineers switched to and from KCTS's signal until the station's owners, the Yakima Board of Education, got enough funding for the station to be self-supporting. The station became a community licensee in 1984, but found the going difficult until its merger with KCTS. KYVE did produce a few local programs, including the KYVE Apple Bowl with host Tony Leita, a high school quiz competition; Northwest Outdoors with Wally Pease, an outdoors program; and Country Roads with Gwyn Gilmore, a showcase of country music videos.

During the mid-1990s to the early 2000s, some programs included a combined "KCTS/KYVE" visual bug in the lower-right corner of the screen, indicating they were simulcast to both markets. However, since the early 2000s, KYVE has largely been a straight simulcast of KCTS, so the screen bug was dropped. Combined, the two stations serve 2.4 million people, accounting for almost two-thirds of Washington state's population.

Its former studios were located at Braeburn Hall at Yakima Valley Community College. But since the start of the millennium, local origination was severely reduced, and eventually, Braeburn Hall was torn down. KYVE later moved to a small office on 2nd Street (at the bottom of the Larson Building). KYVE struggled with financial instability in the late 2000s, eventually discontinuing local programming in May 2014 and rebranding as KCTS Yakima, maintaining a direct feed of KCTS; the office was closed in October 2014 after the station's sole employee left his position as station manager. This office is now home to the ticket office and administration for the Yakima Valley Pippins baseball team, and aside from the Ahtanum Ridge transmitter and the legal hourly station ID, KYVE no longer has any presence in Yakima.

== Programming ==
KCTS is perhaps best known for producing/distributing the popular PBS Kids show Bill Nye the Science Guy, as well as other programs such as Students by Nature (not a PBS-distributed program), The Miracle Planet, cooking shows by Nick Stellino, Chefs A' Field, and the annual televised high school academic competition KYVE Apple Bowl.

KCTS produced KCTS Connects, a weekly half-hour public affairs program hosted by longtime personality Enrique Cerna, from 2000 until its 2012 cancellation. After the merger with Crosscut, KCTS started airing a weekly one-minute news report named Crosscut Now circa 2019; it was increased to 10 minutes in 2023 and was renamed The Newsfeed the following year upon the branding unification into Cascade PBS.

KCTS also collaborated with Talaris Research Institute to produce Parenting Counts: A Focus on Early Learning: a series of 1-minute informational shorts on a child’s first five years of learning to air between programs on select PBS stations.

KCTS was among a number of PBS member stations to air the controversial "Sugartime!" episode of Postcards from Buster, a spinoff of Arthur about a cartoon rabbit named Buster Baxter, who travels the country with his father and interacts with children from different cultures and in different family structures. The episode had been removed from PBS Kids Go!'s national broadcast schedule after PBS received a critical letter from then-newly-appointed Education Secretary Margaret Spellings, who was upset that Buster was visiting a Vermont family headed by two women. WGBH, the Boston-based PBS affiliate and original producer of the program, subsequently made the episode available to stations that still wished to air it on an individual basis.

== Technical information ==
=== Subchannels ===
The stations' signals are multiplexed:

Subchannels of KCTS-TV and KYVE
Subchannel		Res.	Short name		Programming
KCTS-TV	KYVE	Res.	KCTS-TV	KYVE	Programming
9.1	47.1	1080i	KCTSHD	KYVE-HD	PBS
9.2	47.2	480i	KIDS		PBS Kids
9.3	47.3	480i	CREATE		Create
9.4	47.4	480i	WORLD		World Channel

=== Analog-to-digital conversion ===
KCTS-TV shut down its analog signal, over VHF channel 9, on June 12, 2009, as part of the federally mandated transition from analog to digital television. The station's digital signal relocated from its pre-transition UHF channel 41 to VHF channel 9.

=== KYVE translators ===
- K17IL-D Ellensburg
- K18AD-D East Wenatchee

== See also ==
- Institute for Nonprofit News (member)
