= Music Album (TV program) =

Canadian music television program

- Genre: Music
- Country of origin: Canada
- Original language: English
- No. of seasons: 1

Production
- Producer: Neil Andrews
- Running time: 30 minutes

Original release
- Network: CBC Television
- Release: 17 September 1970 – 28 June 1971

Music Album is a Canadian music television program that aired on CBC Television from 1970 to 1971.

== Premise ==
This program featured Canadian musical performers in the popular, light classic and show tune genres. Toronto-produced episodes featured Lucio Agostini conducting the show orchestra while the conductor for the Vancouver-produced episodes was Ricky Hyslop. Wally Koster was a frequent guest artist and Howard Cable was a guest conductor.

== Scheduling ==
This half-hour program was broadcast Thursdays at 9:30 p.m. (Eastern) from its debut on 17 September 1970. On 4 February 1971, Music Album moved to a Thursday 10:00 p.m. time slot, then finally a Monday 7:30 p.m. time slot from 24 May until its concluding episode on 28 June 1971.
