= Naches Valley High School =

- Emblem and crest of Naches Valley High School

Location
- 101 W 5th Street; Naches, Washington; 46°44′11″N 120°42′11″W

Information
- Teaching staff: 22.56 (FTE)
- Enrollment: 418 (2023-2024)
- Student to teacher ratio: 18.53
- Color
- Mascot: Ranger
- Website: www.nachesvalley.org/High%20School/highschool.html

Naches Valley High School is a public high school located in Naches, Washington. It serves 350 students in grades 9–12. 80% of the students are White, while 16% are Hispanic, 2% are two or more races, 1% are American Indian, 1% are Black and 1% are Asian.

The Naches mascot is the Ranger Bear . The busing areas stretch from the areas of Gleed and the Naches Heights, to the tops of both White and Chinook Pass.

== Post Graduation ==
Students at Naches range in their post-graduation plans. Several graduates join the workforce, others join the military, some attend technical colleges. The majority of graduates ultimately attend 2 or 4-year university programs upon graduation.
