= WNMU (TV) =

Television station in Marquette, Michigan

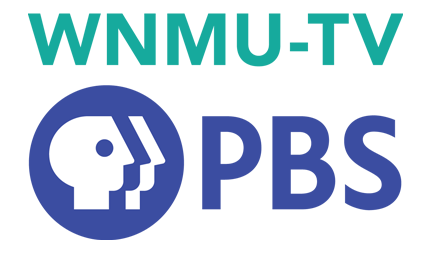
- Marquette, Michigan; United States
- Channels: Digital: 8 (VHF); Virtual: 13
- Branding: WNMU-TV PBS

Programming
- Affiliations: 13.1: PBS; for others, see § Subchannels

Ownership
- Owner: Northern Michigan University; (Board of Control, Northern Michigan University)
- Sister stations: WNMU-FM

History
- First air date: December 28, 1972
- Former call signs: WNPB (1972–1975); WNMU-TV (1975–?)
- Former channel numbers: Analog: 13 (VHF, 1972–2009); Digital: 33 (UHF, until 2009), 13 (VHF, 2009–2020)
- Call sign meaning: Northern Michigan University

Technical information
- Licensing authority: FCC
- Facility ID: 4318
- ERP: 15.5 kW
- HAAT: 323 m (1,060 ft)
- Transmitter coordinates: 46°21′10″N 87°51′15″W

Links
- Public license information: Public file; LMS
- Website: wnmutv.nmu.edu

WNMU (channel 13) is a PBS member television station licensed to Marquette, Michigan, United States, serving the Central and Western Upper Peninsula of Michigan. It is owned by Northern Michigan University alongside NPR member WNMU-FM (90.1). Both outlets share studios at the Edgar L. Harden Learning Resource Center on the university's campus on Presque Isle Avenue in Marquette; the television station's transmitter is located in Ely Township southwest of Ishpeming.

== Overview ==
WNMU first went on the air in 1972, under call sign WNPB. The call signs of WNPB and what had been WNMR-FM were changed to WNMU in December 1975, two weeks apart.

WNMU serves all communities in the UP, over the air on channel 13 in the central UP, and on cable regionwide, including portions of northern Wisconsin not served by PBS Wisconsin stations WPNE-TV or WLEF-TV.

It is also seen on Charter Spectrum cable in Sault Ste. Marie, Michigan, instead of WCMU-TV, which the rest of the market receives via transmitters throughout the Northern Lower Peninsula of Michigan. In most of the Eastern UP, cable or satellite are required to receive any PBS service; when the digital conversion took place in 2009, the Eastern UP lost terrestrial PBS service when WCMU satellite WCML in Alpena lowered its transmitter power for its digital broadcasts. Neither WCMU nor WNMU currently have plans to expand into the Eastern UP to fill the void left by the departure of WCML from the Eastern UP airwaves.

WNMU was part of the Shaw line-up on its Sault Ste. Marie, Ontario, system until 2002, when it was replaced with Detroit's WTVS.

The transmitter for WNMU-TV is located just outside Ishpeming in Ely Township. The antenna is 1,000 feet (300 m) tall.

The future of WNMU radio and TV was threatened in recent years, as budget cuts led to a proposed sale or closure of the stations. However, new funding was approved, keeping the station on the air.

== Programming ==
WNMU produces a number of shows directly from their studios.

- High School Bowl, hosted by Jim Koski
- Media Meet, a weekly public affairs program focused on issues important to residents of Michigan's Upper Peninsula, hosted by Mike Settles.
- Ask The..., a live call-in series hosted by a panel of experts where viewers may call and have their question discussed on air. There are several shows including Ask The Doctors, Ask The DNR, Ask The Lawyers, and more.
- What's Up?, a brief community calendar interview program.
- Public Eye News, a 15-minute news broadcast run by students at NMU.

In 2012, a broadcast titled Mauvais Sort: Spellbound won a Good News Award for uplifting and excellent journalism.

== Technical information ==
=== Subchannels ===
The station's signal is multiplexed:

Subchannels of WNMU
Channel	Res.	Short name	Programming
13.1	1080i	WNMU-HD	PBS
13.2	480i	WNMU-KD	PBS Kids
13.3	1080i	WNMU-PL	WNMU-TV Plus
13.4	480i	WNMUMLC	Michigan Learning Channel
13.7	Audio only	FM-Test	Simulcast of WNMU-FM

=== Analog-to-digital conversion ===
WNMU ended regular programming on its analog signal, over VHF channel 13, on June 12, 2009, the official date on which full-power television stations in the United States transitioned from analog to digital broadcasts under federal mandate. The station's digital signal relocated from its pre-transition UHF channel 33 to VHF channel 13.
