= High School Bowl =

American television program

- Presented by: Jim Koski
- Country of origin: United States
- Original language: English
- No. of seasons: 46

Production
- Producer: Mike Lakenen
- Running time: 30 minutes

Original release
- Network: WNMU TV-13
- Release: 1977

High School Bowl is a quiz bowl television program produced by WNMU. Each season of High School Bowl features 40 high schools from the Upper Peninsula of Michigan and northern Wisconsin who compete against each other in a bracketed tournament, vying to become the annual champion. Each team is composed of four people, including a captain, who answer questions on a variety of subjects: including history, science, art, math, music, literature, and geography. Questions for High School Bowl have been provided by National Academic Quiz Tournaments since 2014. High School Bowl has been hosted by Jim Koski since 2014; past hosts include G.G. Gordon and Dave Goldsmith. As of 2019, High School Bowl is WNMU Public TV-13's highest rated production.

At the end of every season, Northern Michigan University, where WNMU programs are filmed, awards scholarships to the first and second place teams, $2500 and $1500 respectively. In addition, one college-bound senior contestant receives the Dave Goldsmith Scholarship, $1500 goes towards a college education. The scholarship was set up by the Goldsmith family in 2002 after his death, and previously Dave Goldsmith hosted High School Bowl for 24 years.

== Records ==
Since High School Bowl's inception in 1977, Houghton High School of Houghton, Michigan has taken the most championships out of every other participating high school; 10 wins out of 41 seasons. Second to Houghton in terms of wins is Marquette Senior High School of Marquette, Michigan with 7 championships. Other notable participants include Gladstone High School of Gladstone, Michigan and Hancock Central High School of Hancock, Michigan, both with 4 victories.

In recorded history, Marquette Senior High School and Houghton High School have the most second-place finishes, with 7. Second to Marquette Senior High School and Houghton High School is Sault Area High School of Sault Ste. Marie, Michigan, achieving 6 runner-up finishes. Marquette Senior High School holds the record for the greatest consecutive streak of victories, having won five years in a row from 1979 to 1983. Negaunee High School follows closely with three consecutive wins from 2010 to 2012.

== Past winners ==
Year	First place	Second place
1978	Gladstone High School	
1979	Marquette Senior High School	
1980	Marquette Senior High School	
1981	Marquette Senior High School	
1982	Marquette Senior High School	
1983	Marquette Senior High School	
1984	Houghton High School	Marquette Senior High School
1985	Marquette Senior High School	Houghton High School
1986	Houghton High School	L'Anse High School
1987	Norway High School	Marquette Senior High School
1988	Menominee High School	Westwood High School
1989	Norway High School	Houghton High School
1990	Calumet High School	Sault Area High School
1991	Hancock Central High School	Marquette Senior High School
1992	Houghton High School	Gwinn High School
1993	Iron Mountain High School	West Iron County High School
1994	Houghton High School	Hancock Central High School
1995	Marquette Senior High School	Houghton High School
1996	Houghton High School	Sault Area High School
1997	Westwood High School	Sault Area High School
1998	Hancock Central High School	Sault Area High School
1999	Hancock Central High School	Escanaba High School
2000	Westwood High School	Hancock Central High School
2001	Hancock Central High School	Westwood High School
2002	Gwinn High School	Gladstone High School
2003	Sault Area High School	Ewen-Trout Creek Consolidated School
2004	Gladstone High School	Gwinn High School
2005	Gladstone High School	Chassell Township School
2006	Hurley School District	Ishpeming High School
2007	Gladstone High School	Marquette Senior High School
2008	Houghton High School	Negaunee High School
2009	Gwinn High School	Luther L. Wright High School
2010	Negaunee High School	Marquette Senior High School
2011	Negaunee High School	Marquette Senior High School
2012	Negaunee High School	Iron Mountain High School
2013	Superior Central High School	Houghton High School
2014	Houghton High School	Sault Area High School
2015	A.D. Johnston High School	Luther L. Wright High School
2016	Houghton High School	Luther L. Wright High School
2017	Houghton High School	Luther L. Wright High School
2018	Sault Area High School	Luther L. Wright High School
2019	Houghton High School	A.D. Johnston High School
