= Potsdam High School =

Public school in New York, United States

Location
- 29 Leroy St; Potsdam, New York 13676; United States
- Coordinates: 44.6751°N 74.9805°W

Information
- School type: public, comprehensive secondary
- School district: Potsdam Central School District
- NCES District ID: 3623670
- Superintendent: Joann Chambers
- CEEB code: 334610
- NCES School ID: 362367003301
- Principal: Kristin Towne
- Grades: 9-12
- Gender: coed
- Enrollment: 379 (2020-2021)
- Colors: Orange & Blue
- Mascot: Sandstoners
- Website: www.potsdamcsd.org/potsdam-high-school/

Potsdam High School is a public four-year high school located in Potsdam, New York. It is operated by the Potsdam Central School District.

== Extracurriculars ==
=== Athletics ===
As of 2022, the school offered a variety of sports teams that include baseball, basketball, cheer, cross country, football, golf, ice hockey, lacrosse, soccer, swimming, softball, track and field, volleyball, and wrestling.

=== Quiz bowl ===
Potsdam High School won the WPBS-TV's Whiz Quiz contests in 2019 and was awarded the Glenn Gough Championship Trophy. Potsdam won the Glenn Gough Champhionship Trophy again in 2023.

=== Civic engagement ===
The Potsdam High School Positivity Club received a $10,000 grant from the KFC Foundation's Kentucky Fried Wishes program in September 2021 to help improve its community food market and obtain laptop computers for senior citizens.
