= Îles des Saintes =

Group of islands in Guadeloupe, overseas France

Coordinates: 15°52′N 61°36′W

Les Saintes
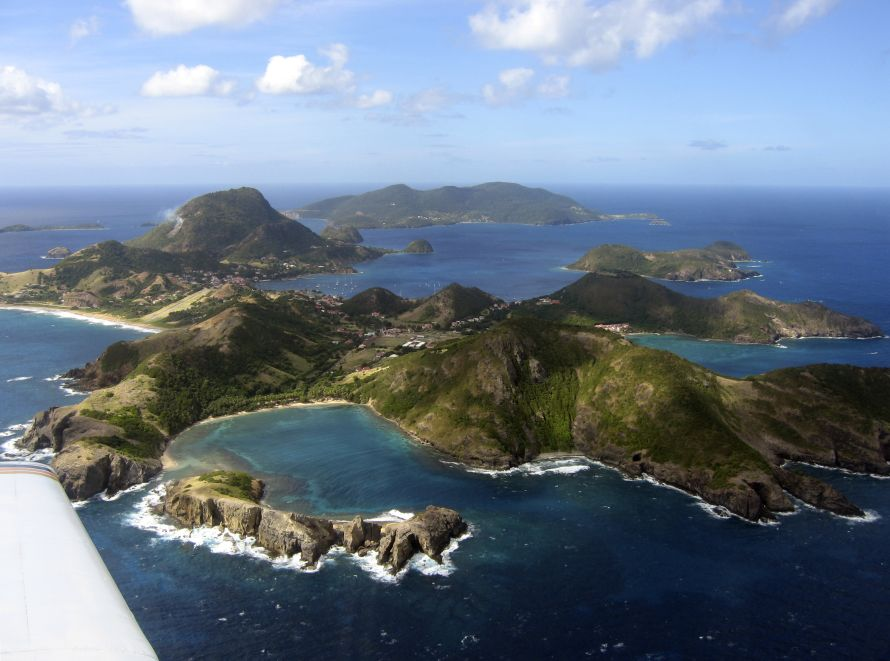
- Aerial photo of Les Saintes

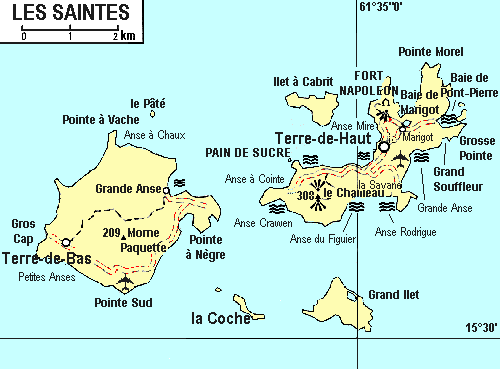
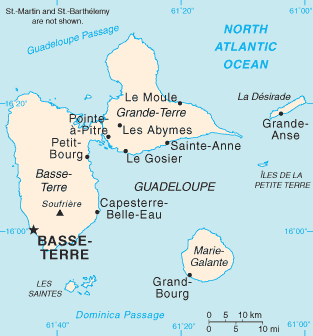
- Map of Les Saintes Map of Guadeloupe with Les Saintes

Geography
- Location: Caribbean Sea
- Archipelago: Lesser Antilles
- Total islands: 9
- Major islands: Terre-de-Bas Island, Terre-de-Haut Island
- Area: 12.8 km^{2} (4.9 sq mi)

Administration
- France
- Overseas department: Guadeloupe
- Largest quartiers: Fond-du-Curé; Petite-Anse

Demographics
- Population: 3,418 (2008)
- Pop. density: 267/km^{2} (697.5/sq mi)
- Languages: French; Les Saintes Creole; Antillean Creole
- Ethnic groups: European; Mulatto; Mestizo

Additional information
- Time zone: AST (UTC-4:00)

The Îles des Saintes (pronounced [il de sɛ̃t]; lit. 'Islands of the (Female) Saints'), also known as Les Saintes (Antillean Creole: Lésent, pronounced [lesɛ̃t]), is a group of small islands in the archipelago of Guadeloupe, an overseas department of France. It is part of the Canton of Trois-Rivières and is divided into two communes: Terre-de-Haut and Terre-de-Bas. It is in the arrondissement of Basse-Terre and also in Guadeloupe's 4th constituency.

== Etymology ==
Christopher Columbus named the islands "Los Santos" or "Todos los Santos" (Spanish for "The Saints" or "All Saints"), in reference to All Saints' Day. He and his crew first sighted the islands in November of 1493, just after All Saints' Day. When the area became a French colony, the Spanish name was retained – but with French orthography and phonology.

== History ==
=== Pre-Columbian ===
Les Saintes, due to their location in the heart of the Lesser Antilles, were frequented first by Indian tribes coming from Caribbean and Central America. Caaroucaëra (the Arawak name of Îles des Saintes), although uninhabited due to the lack of spring water, were regularly visited by Arawak peoples then Kalinagos living on the neighbourhood islands of Guadeloupe and Dominica around the 9th century. They went there to practise hunting and fishing. The archaeological remains of war axes and pottery dug up on the site of Anse Rodrigue's Beach and stored at "Fort Napoléon" museum testify the visits of these populations.

=== Discovery and colonisation ===
It was during his second expedition for America, that Christopher Columbus discovered the small archipelago, on 4 November 1493. He named them "Los Santos", in reference to All Saints' Day which had just been celebrated. Around 1523, along with its neighbours, these islands, which were devoid of precious metals, were abandoned by the Spanish who favoured the Greater Antilles and the South American continent.

On 18 October 1648, a French expedition led by Sir du Mé, annexed les Saintes, already under English influence, at the request of the governor of Guadeloupe, Charles Houël. From 1649, the islands became a colony exploited by the French West India Company which tried to establish agriculture. However, the inhospitable ground and the aridity of "Terre-de-Haut" halted this activity, though it persisted for a while on Terre-de-Bas, which was wetter and more fertile, under the orders of Sir Hazier du Buisson from 1652.

In 1653, the Kalinagos slaughtered the French troops in Marie-Galante. Sir du Mé decided to respond to this attack by sending a punitive expedition against the tribes in Dominica. Following these events, the Kalinagos, invaded les Saintes to take revenge. Sir Comte de l'Etoile tried to repel the Caribs who were definitively chased away in 1658. In the name of the King of France, les Saintes were acquired in the royal domain by Jean-Baptiste Colbert when the French West India Company was dissolved in 1664.

On 4 August 1666, while the English were attacking the archipelago, their fleet was routed by the passage of a hurricane and some British who besieged this "Gibraltar of the Antilles" were quickly expelled by the troops of Sir du Lion and Sir Desmeuriers, helped by the Caribs. The English surrendered on 15 August 1666, the day of the Assumption of Mary, and a Te Deum was intoned at the request of Sir du Lion who founded an annual remembrance in honour to this victory – this is celebrated ardently on the island of Terre-de-Haut to this day. Our-Lady-of-Assumption became the Patron saint of the parish.

To protect the French colonies of the area, the English were repelled to Barbados by the governor of Santo Domingo, Jean-Baptiste Ducasse in 1691.

=== 18th century ===
From 1759 to 1763, the British took possession of Les Saintes and a part of Guadeloupe. Les Saintes were restored to the Kingdom of France only after the signature of the Treaty of Paris on 10 February 1763, by which France gave up Île Royale, Isle Saint-Jean, Acadia and Canada, the Great Lakes region and the left bank of the Mississippi to the British. To prevent further British ambitions, King Louis XVI ordered the construction of fortifications on Les Saintes. Thus began the construction of "Fort Louis" on the Mire Hill, "Fort de la Reine" on Petite Martinique island, the watchtowers of "Modele tower" on Chameau Hill (the top of the archipelago, 309 m), the artillery batteries of Morel Hill and Mouillage Hill, in 1777.

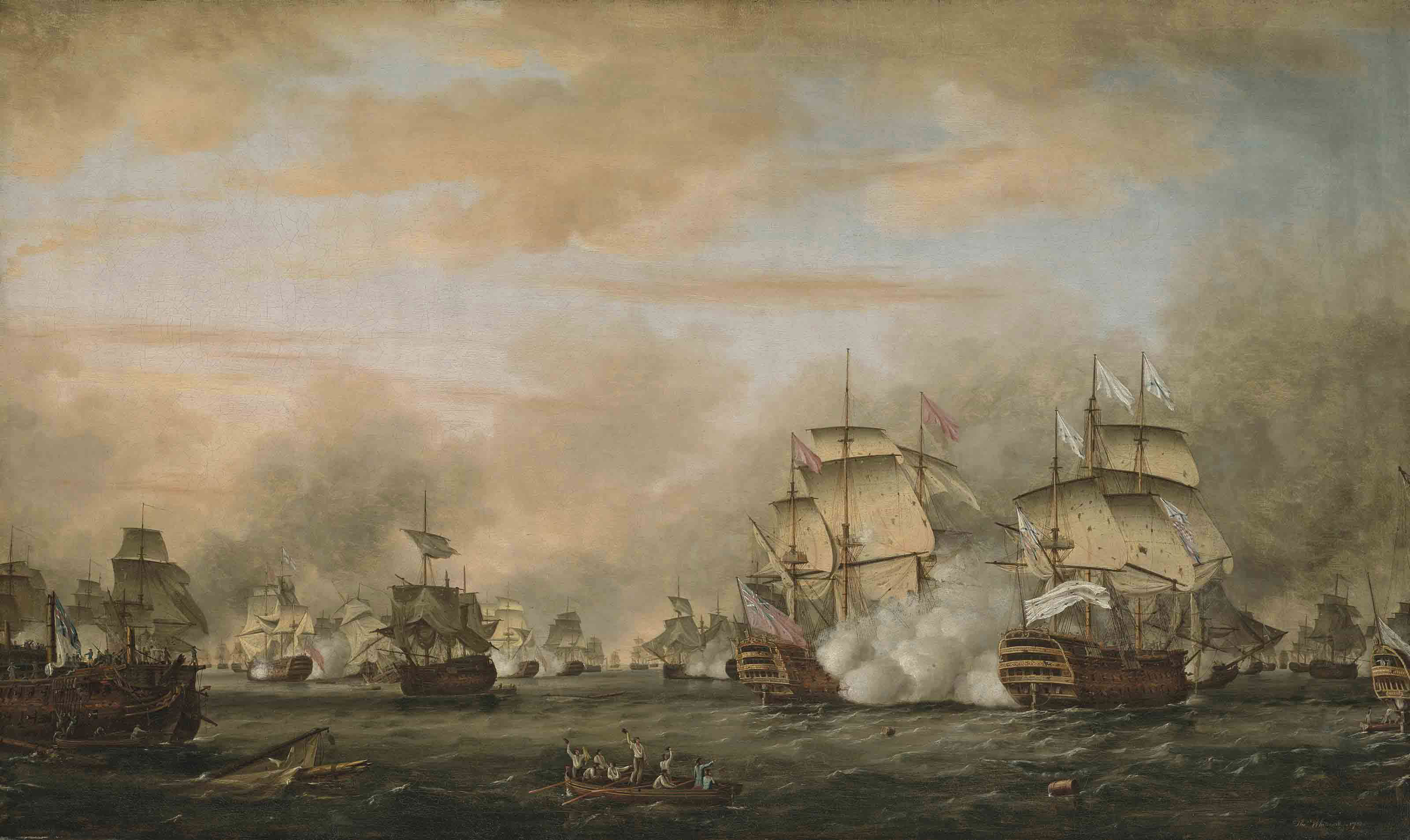
Battle of Les Saintes, 12 April 1782

On 12 April 1782, after the military campaign of January in Basseterre on the island of Saint Christopher, the French fleet of Comte de Grasse, which aimed to capture British Jamaica, left Martinique and headed towards the archipelago of les Saintes, where it arrived in the evening. Caught in the Dominica Passage by the British and inferior in number, it was engaged and defeated by the ships of the line of George Brydges Rodney aboard the Formidable and Samuel Hood aboard the Barfleur. According to legend, after he had fired the last of the ammunition of his carronades, de Grasse fired off his silverware. In a little more than five hours, 2,000 French sailors and soldiers were killed and wounded, and 5,000 men and 4 ships of the line captured and one ship of the line sunk. The defeat resulted in Îles des Saintes coming under British rule for twenty years.

In 1794, France's National Convention, represented by Victor Hugues, tried to reconquer the islands but succeeded in occupying them only temporarily, the islands being recaptured away by the powerful British vessel Queen Charlotte.

=== 19th century ===
In 1802, the First French Empire under Napoleon launched a successful operation to recapture the archipelago from the British. On 14 April 1809, British forces captured the archipelago. Three young people from les Saintes, Mr. Jean Calo, Mr. Cointre and Mr. Solitaire, succeeded in guiding three French vessels (D'Hautpoul, Courageux, and Félicité) commanded by the infantry division of Admiral Troude which were caught unawares inside the bay and helped them to escape back to France through the North Passage called "La baleine". These men were decorated with the Legion of Honour for their actions.

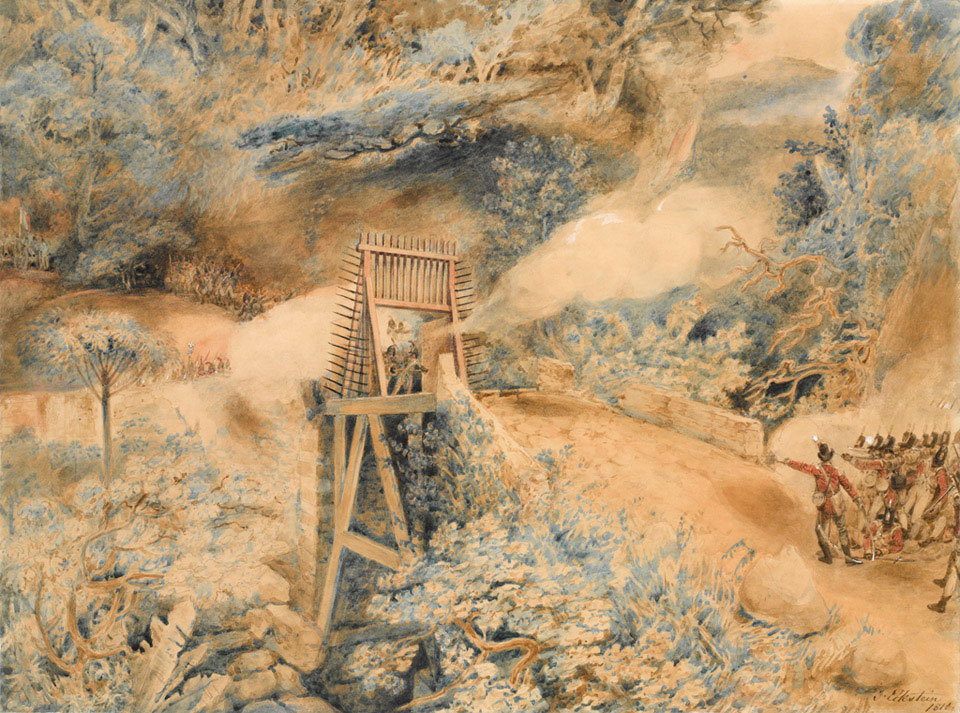
Illustration of the 3rd West India Regiment engaging French troops during the 1809 British invasion of the Îles des Saintes

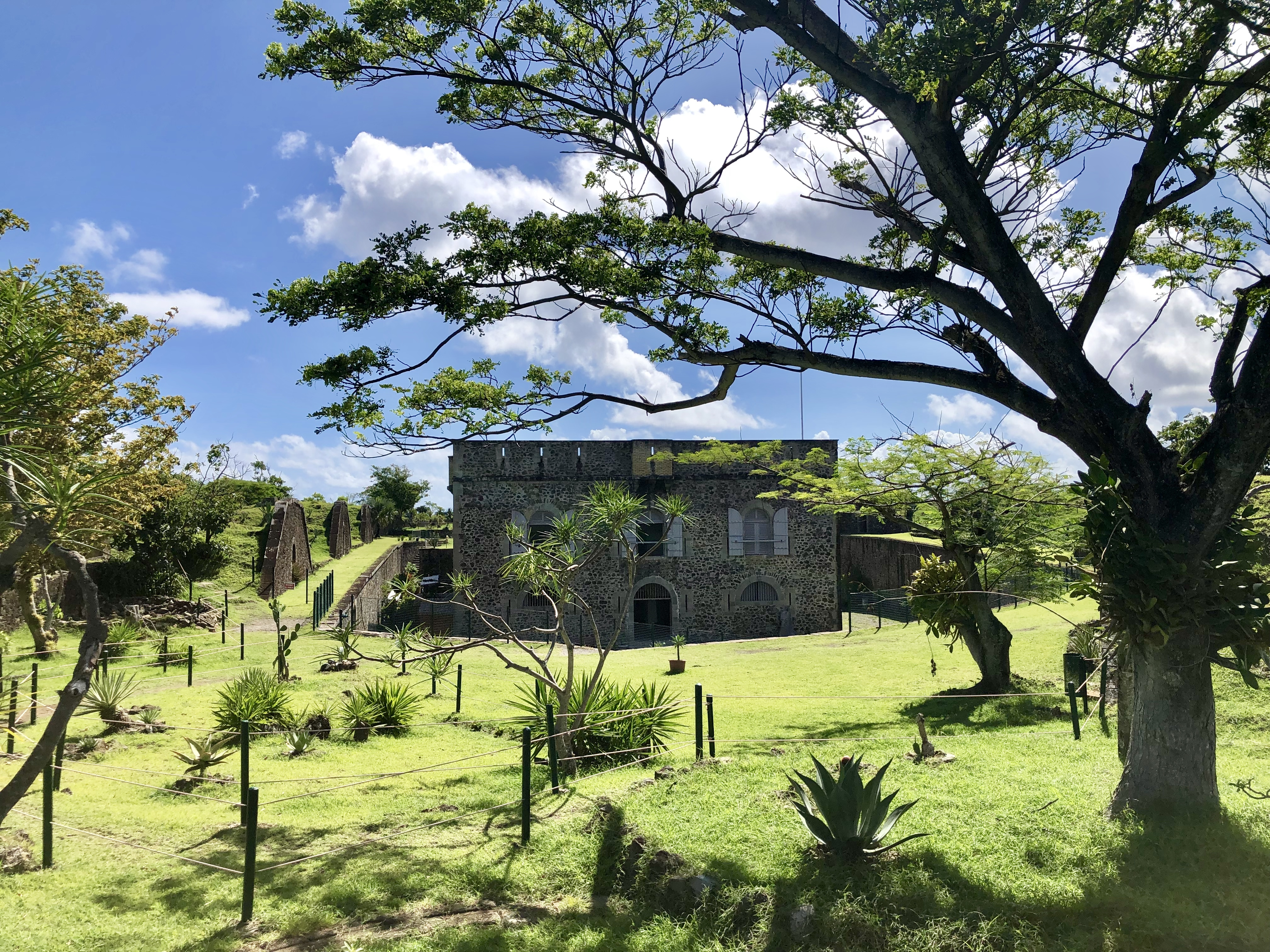
Fort Napoléon

Guadeloupe was invaded in February 1810 by the British, and Governor Jean Augustin Ernouf was soon forced to capitulate. By a bilateral treaty signed in Stockholm on 3 March 1813, Sweden promised the British that they would make a common front against Napoleon's France. In return, the British would have to support the ambitions of Stockholm on Norway. Pragmatically, Karl XIV Johan indeed understood that it was time for Sweden to abandon Finland (lost in 1809) and to spread the kingdom westward. Besides, Great Britain offered the colony of Guadeloupe to Karl XIV Johan personally to seal this new alliance.

Under the Treaty of Paris signed on 30 May 1814, the United Kingdom accepted to give Guadeloupe back to France. King Karl XIV Johan of Sweden retroceded Guadeloupe to France and earned in exchange the recognition of the Union of Sweden and Norway and the payment to the Swedish royal house of 24 million gold francs in compensation (Guadeloupe Fund). However, the French only came back to les Saintes on 5 December, when the General Leith, commander in chief of forces in the West Indies and governor of the Leeward Isles accepted it.

The new governor of Guadeloupe and dependencies, the Commodore Sir Comte de Linois and his deputy governor Sir Eugène-Édouard Boyer, Baron de Peyreleau, sent by Louis XVIII to repossess the colony were quickly disturbed by the return of Napoleon I in April 1815 (Hundred Days). A conflict broke out between Bonapartists and monarchists.

On 19 June 1815, Sir Comte de Linois (monarchist) forced by Sir Boyer de Peyreleau (Bonapartist), rejoined the Bonapartists and sent away a British frigate dispatched by the governor of the Windward Islands in Martinique, Sir Pierre René Marie, Comte de Vaugiraud to secure the colony's loyalty to Louis XVIII. Sir Comte de Vaugiraud relieved them of their duties and the British took the offensive. Les Saintes were captured again by the crown of Great Britain on 6 July 1815, Marie-Galante on 18 July and Guadeloupe on 10 August.

Despite the defeat of the Bonapartists and the restoration of Louis XVIII, on the request of the planters of Guadeloupe (favourable to the British) and by order of General Leith the British stayed to purge the colony of Bonapartism. The Bonapartists were judged and deported. The British troops left the colony to the French on 22 July 1816. Sir Antoine Philippe, Comte de Lardenoy was named by the King, Governor and Administrator of Guadeloupe and dependencies on 25 July 1816.

It was in 1822 that the Chevalier de Fréminville legend was born. Christophe-Paulin de la Poix, named Chevalier de Fréminville, a sailor and naturalist in a military campaign to les Saintes aboard the vessel La Néréïde shared a dramatic love story with a Saintoise named Caroline (known as "Princess Caroline" in reference to her legendary beauty). She committed suicide down from the artillery battery of Morel Hill which bears her name today, thinking her beloved man dead at Saint-Christopher, not seeing him come back from campaign. This condemned the knight to madness; taken by sorrow, he took Caroline's clothes and returned to Brest, where he stayed until the end of his days. Engravings and narratives are kept at Fort Napoléon museum.

In 1844, during Louis Philippe I's reign, the construction of a fort began on the ruins of the old Fort Louis. The fortification was built to the technique of Vauban to protect the archipelago against a possible reconquest.

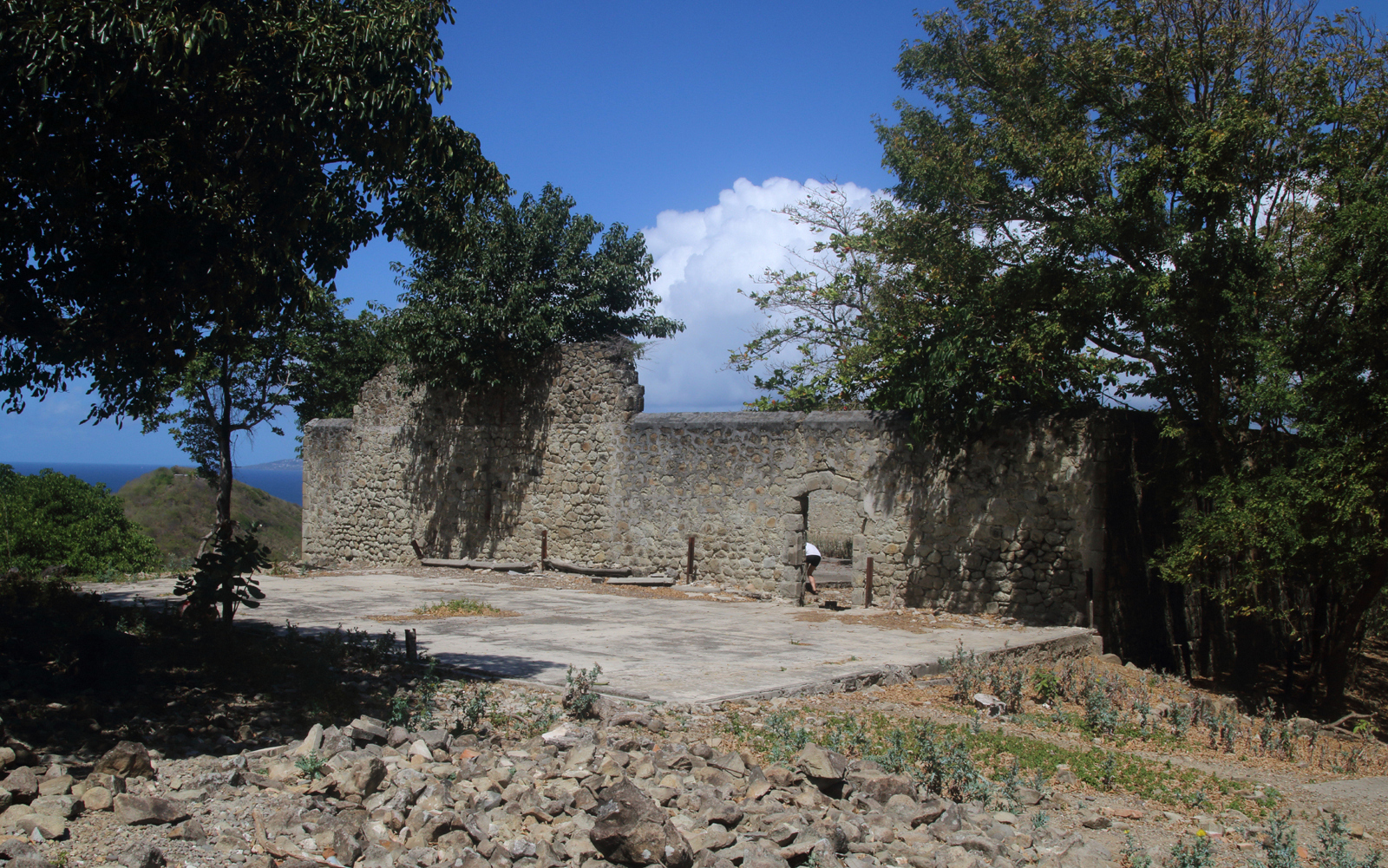
Fort Joséphine on Les Saintes

In 1851, a penitentiary was built on Petite Martinique island, which became renamed îlet à Cabrit; in 1856 a prison reserved for women replaced it. It was destroyed in 1865 by a hurricane. The fort, begun during Louis-Philippe's reign, was finished in 1867 in the reign of Napoleon III who baptised it Fort Napoléon in honour of his uncle, Napoleon I. Fort de la Reine was renamed Fort Joséphine at the same time. A lazaretto was opened in 1871 instead of the penitentiary.

On 9 August 1882, under Jules Grévy's mandature, at the request of the municipal councillors and following the church's requirements asking for the creation of Saint-Nicholas's parish, the municipality of Terre-de-Bas was created, separating from Terre-de-Haut which also became a municipality. This event marked the end of the municipality of les Saintes. The patron saint's day of Terre-de-Bas was then established on 6 December, St Nicholas'Day.

In 1903, the military and disciplinary garrisons were definitively given up. It was the end of the "Gibraltar of the Antilles", but in honour of its military past, the ships of the navy made a traditional stopover. In 1906, the cruiser Duguay-Trouin stopped over at les Saintes. In September 1928, les Saintes, like its neighbouringislands of Guadeloupe, were violently struck by a strong cyclone which destroyed an important part of the municipal archives. From 1934 the first inns were built, which marked the beginning of visits to the island by the outside world.

=== Dissidence and French overseas departmentalisation ===
In June 1940, answering the appeal of General de Gaulle, the French Antilles entered into a Resistance movement against Vichy regime and Nazi collaboration. They called it Dissidence. The governor, appointed by Marshal Philippe Pétain, Constant Sorin, was in charge of administering Guadeloupe and its dependencies. Les Saintes became the Mecca of dissidence.

The French Antilles were affected by the arbitrary power and the authoritarian ideology of Pétain and Pierre Laval. The ministry of the colonies of Vichy, by its colonial representatives Mr. Constant Sorin and Admiral Georges Robert, High Commissioner of France, applied its whole legislation including the anti-semitic laws. A strong police state was set up and any resistance was actively repressed. Seeing the rallying of the French Antilles to the regime of Vichy, the islands were embargoed by the British-American forces. Cut from any relationship (in particular the import of fuels and foodstuffs) with France, Constant Sorin set up a policy of rationing and self-sufficiency, by diversifying and increasing the local production. It was a period of resourcefulness.

On 27 October 1940, the General council was dissolved and the Mayors of Guadeloupe and its dependencies were relieved of their duties and replaced by prominent citizens appointed by the Vichy government. The mayor of Terre-de-Haut, Théodore Samson, was replaced by a Béké of Martinique, Mr. de Meynard. Popular gatherings were forbidden and freedom of expression was banned by the regime. A passive resistance to Vichy and its local representatives was organised from 1940 to 1943. More than 4,000 French West Indians left their islands, at the risk of their life, to join the nearby British colonies. Then they rallied the Free French Forces, first by undertaking military training in the United States, Canada or Great Britain. At the same time, Fort Napoléon became a political jail where the dissidents were locked. The Saintois boarded their traditional Saintoise to the Guadeloupean coast to pick up the volunteers for dissidence departure. Then, they were sailed through Dominica Passage, avoiding the cruisers and patrol boats of Admiral Robert.

In March 1943, the French Guyanese rebelled against the regime and rallied the allies. French West Indians followed the movement and in April, May and June 1943, a civil movement of resistance took weapons and rebelled against Vichy's administration. In Martinique, the marines of Fort-de-France also rebelled against Admiral Robert.

With shortages from the embargo making life more and more difficult, Admiral Robert sent to the Americans his will to capitulate, seeking the end of the blockade, on 30 June 1943.

On 3 July 1943, the American admiral John Howard Hoover came to Martinique and on 8 July 1943, the American government required an unconditional surrender to the authority of the French Committee of National Liberation and offered asylum to Admiral Robert.

On 15 July 1943, Governor Constant Sorin and Admiral Robert were relieved of their duties by Henri Hoppenot, ambassador of Free French Forces, and the French Antilles also joined the allies. Admiral Robert left the island the same day for the United States.

Many of the dissidents were sent to the North African fronts and participated in Operation Dragoon beside the Allies.

On 19 March 1946, the President of the Provisional Government of the French Republic promulgated the law of departmentalisation, which set up the colonies of Guadeloupe, Martinique, La Réunion and French Guiana, as overseas departments. From then on, les Saintes, Marie-Galante, La Désirade, Saint-Barthélemy and the French side of Saint-Martin were joined, as municipalities, with Guadeloupe Island into the new department of Guadeloupe. The colonial status up until then was replaced by a policy of assimilation to the rest of the metropolitan territory.

In 1957, in the country's municipal elections, the mysterious death of the mayor of Terre-de-Haut, Théodore Samson, while he was in the office of the National Gendarmerie provoked an uprising of the population against the institution which was attacked with conches and stones. The revolt lasted two days before being quelled by the military and police reinforcements from Guadeloupe whom dissipated the crowd, looked for and arrested the insurgents (mainly of the "Pineau" family, Théodore Samson's political support). A frigate of the navy stayed a few weeks in the harbour of les Saintes to restore the peace.

=== Development of tourism ===
In 1963, the archipelago welcomed SS France during its first transatlantic voyage, which moored in the bay like the Italian, Swedish, Norwegian and American cruise ships which continue today to frequent the small archipelago. The era of the luxury yacht began.

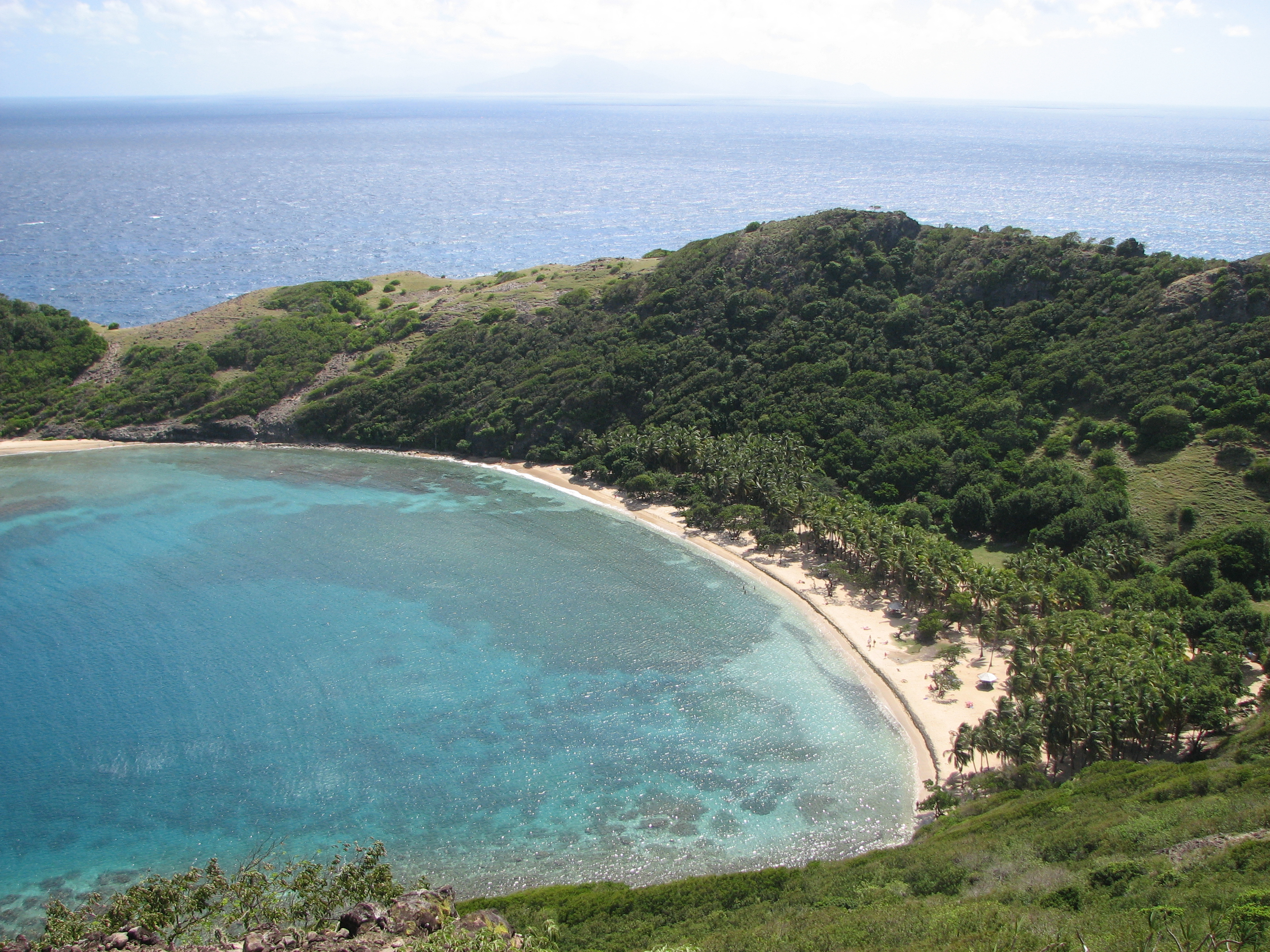
Pompierre Beach

In 1969, the first hotel of the island, "Le Bois Joli" opened its doors at Anse à Cointre beach.

In 1972, les Saintes was equipped with a desalination plant to supply the population. However, distribution costs were too much, so the activity was abandoned in 1993 and replaced by a submarine supply piped from Capesterre-Belle-Eau. Similarly, for electricity, although an emergency power plant of fuel oil remains active on the island of Terre-de-Bas.

In 1974, Fort Napoléon was restored by the Club of the Old Manor House and the Saintoise Association of the Protection of Heritage (A.S.P.P), and accommodated a museum of the history and heritage of les Saintes. It became the most visited monument in the archipelago. In 1984, the Jardin Exotique de Monaco and Jardin botanique du Montet sponsored the creation of an exotic garden on the covered way of Fort Napoléon.

In 1990, for "La route des fleurs" ("The road of flowers", a national contest between the municipalities of France which rewards the most flowery municipality), Terre-de-Haut was coupled with the city of Baccarat, famous for its crystal glass-making.

At the same time, the island of Terre-de-Haut was rewarded by an "environment Oscar" (a French award to municipalities protecting their heritage and environment) for the conservation of its heritage and natural housing environment.

On 14 May 1991, the sites of the Bay of Pompierre and Pain de Sucre were classified as protected spaces according to the law of 2 May 1930.

In 1994, the tourism office of les Saintes was created. The island welcomes approximately 300,000 visitors a year and became a destination appreciated by cruises and sailors.

On 20 May 1994, during his travel in the Antilles, the Prime Minister of France, Édouard Balladur, made an official visit to Terre-de-Haut.

In May 2001, les Saintes joined the Club of the Most Beautiful Bays of the World.

=== 2004 earthquake ===
On 21 November 2004, the islands of les Saintes were struck by an earthquake of magnitude 6.3. It was an intraplate earthquake situated on a system of normal faults going from les Saintes to the north of Dominica. These faults are globally directed 135° (north-west to south-east), with dip north-east (Roseau fault, Ilet fault, Colibri fault, Marigot Fault) or south-west (Souffleur fault, Rodrigues fault, Redonda fault). These faults bound zones of rifts corresponding to an extension located on Roseau volcano (an inactive submarine volcano). The epicentre was offshore, located between the island of Dominica and les Saintes archipelago, at approximately 15°47'N 61°28'W, on Souffleur fault. The depth of the focus is located on the Earth's crust, and is superficial, about 10,000 metres (32,808 ft). The concussions of the main shock and the numerous aftershocks were powerful, reaching an intensity of VIII (important structural damage) on the MSK scale. Damage to the most vulnerable properties in les Saintes, in Trois-Rivières (Guadeloupe) and in the North of Dominica was considerable. In Trois-Rivières, a collapsed wall killed a sleeping girl and seriously hurt her sister. In les Saintes, even though no-one was killed or badly wounded, many were traumatised by the strong and numerous aftershocks.

=== Political and institutional evolution ===
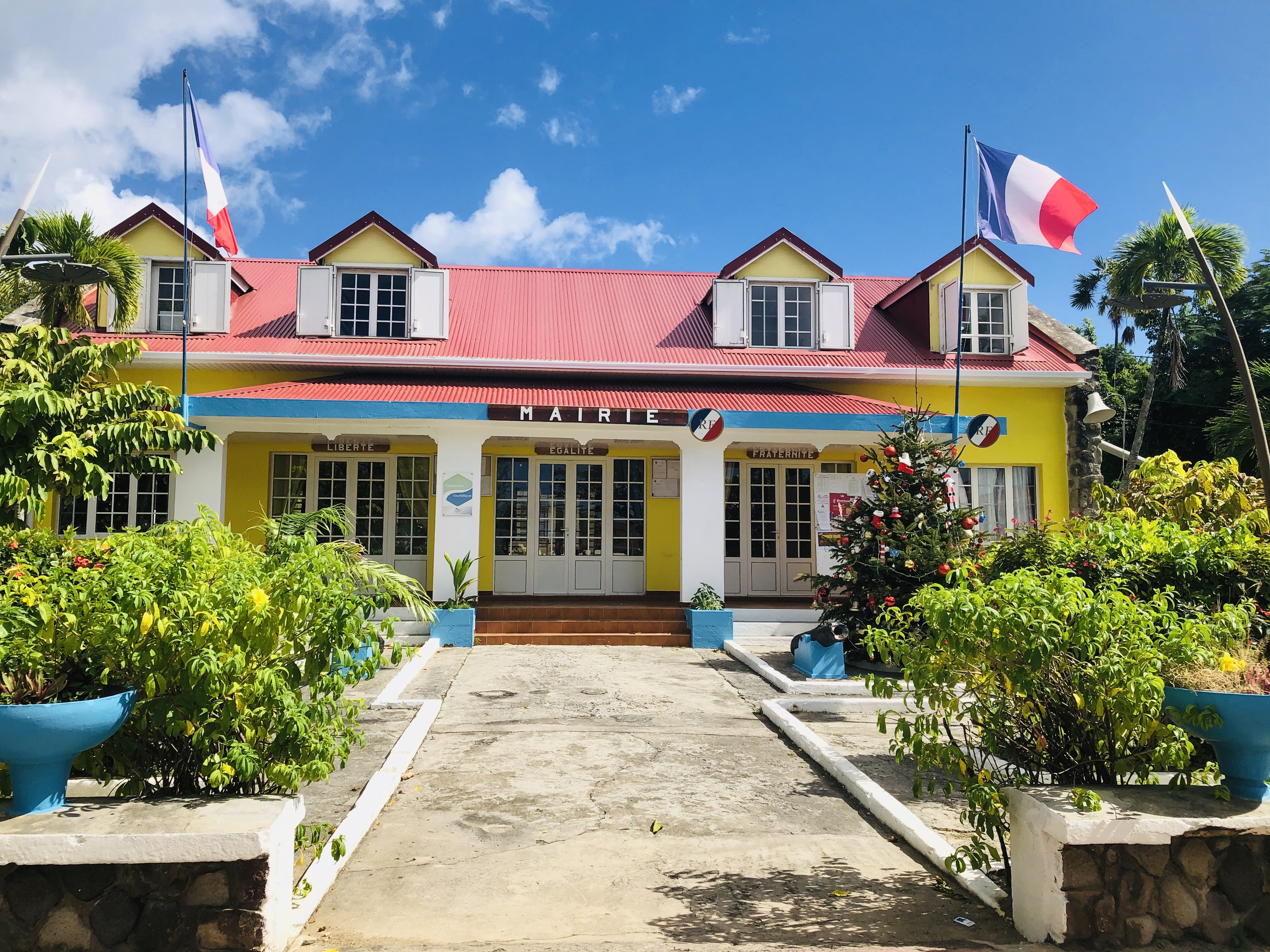
Townhall of Terre-de-Haut on Les Saintes

On 7 December 2003, the islands of les Saintes, integrated into the department of Guadeloupe, participated in a referendum on the institutional evolution of that French overseas department and rejected it by a majority of "No".

During the 2009 French Caribbean general strikes, les Saintes did not get involved in the movement and were only moderately affected: the supply of stores was very perturbed like other places in Guadeloupe, but these strikes mostly concerned small and medium enterprises (SMEs) (weakly presented on these islands). The maritime transport companies tried hard to find some Gasoil to assure most of the connections, and the Guadeloupean tourism was partially transferred to les Saintes.

Nicolas Sarkozy declared, at the end of the conflict, the opening of États-Généraux de l'Outre-mer ("Estates-general of the Overseas"). Several study groups were created, one of which looked into the local governance, brought to conceive an institutional modification project or a new status of Guadeloupe with or without emancipation of its last dependencies. The conferences of the "southern islands" (name of the last dependencies of Guadeloupe: Marie Galante, les Saintes and la Désirade) were opened in parallel. Problems common to these islands were exposed in six study groups: the equality of opportunity, the territorial continuity, the local governance, the local economic development, the insertion by the activity and tourism.

On 12 May 2009, the French overseas Minister, Yves Jégo, at the end of these conferences, made an official visit to les Saintes for the seminary of the southern islands of Guadeloupe. He took into account the identical reality and the political hopes of these islands, to improve the territorial continuity, to reduce the effects of the double-insularity, the abolition of the dependence to Guadeloupe, national representation, the development of the attractiveness of the labour pool in the zone, the fight against the depopulation, the tax system and the expensive life. For the moment he announced the signature of a contract baptised COLIBRI ("hummingbird"; Contract for the Employment and the Local Initiatives in the Regional Pond of the Southern Islands of Guadeloupe), a convention of the Grouping of Public Interest for Arrangement and Development (GIPAD) and a proposition of statutory evolution in final, like the study group of governance, the collective of the southern islands of Guadeloupe and the elected representatives asked it, on the basis of the article 74 of the French constitution.

Les Saintes, like Marie Galante, aspires to the creation of an overseas collectivity for each entity of the Southern islands, or combining the three dependences, on the same plan as the old northern islands of Guadeloupe (Saint-Barthélemy and Saint-Martin). Marie-Luce Penchard, native of Guadeloupe, brought in a governmental portfolio for overseas on 23 June 2009 and appointed Overseas Minister on 6 November 2009, seems wildly opposed to the initial project of her predecessor and delays applying it.

== Geography ==
Les Saintes is a volcanic archipelago fully encircled by shallow reefs. It arose from the recent volcanic belt of the Lesser Antilles from the Pliocene Epoch. It is composed of rocks appeared on the Tertiary age between (4.7 to 2 million years ago). By origin, it was a unique island that the tectonic and volcanic earthquakes separate to create an archipelago due to the subduction zone between the South American plate, the North American plate and the Caribbean plate. The total surface is 12.8 km^{2} (4.9 sq mi). The archipelago has approximately 22 km (14 mi) of coast and its highest hill, Chameau ("Camel"), reaches about 309 metres (1,014 ft).

The Pain de sucre peninsula, with the height of (53 metres (174 ft)) is linked to Terre-de-Haut by an isthmus. It is situated between two small beaches. It is constituted by an alignment of columnar basalt.

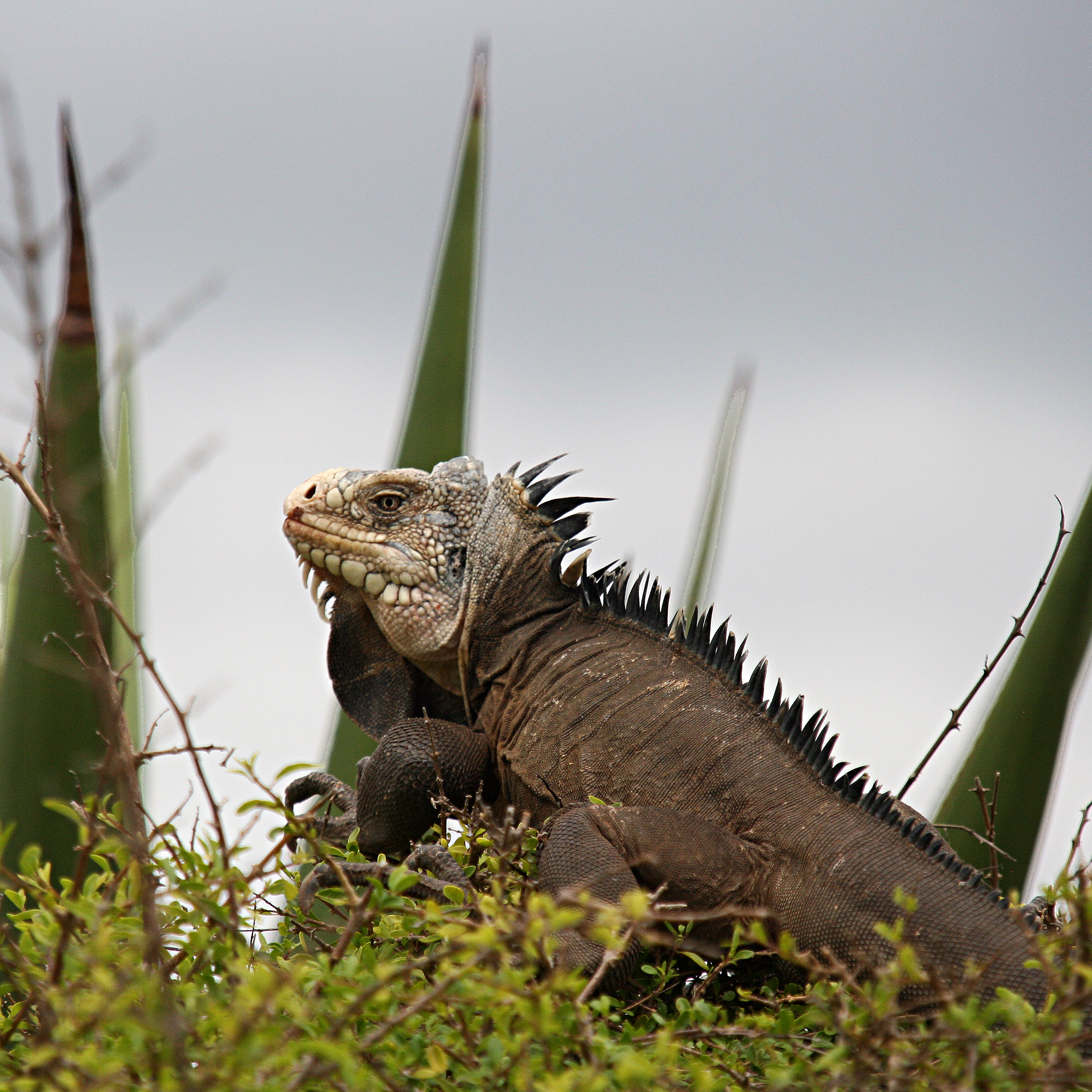
Iguana delicatissima on Terre-de-Bas

=== Islands ===
It is composed of two very mountainous inhabited islands, Terre-de-Haut Island and Terre-de-Bas Island. Grand-Îlet is an uninhabited protected area. There are six other uninhabited îslets.

==== Îlet à Cabrit ====
At 1 km (0.62 mi) at the northwest of Terre-de-Haut Island, closing partially the Bay of les Saintes. It is approximately 1.2 km (0.75 mi) from east to west and 750 m (0.47 mi) from north to south. Its highest mount up to 90 m (300 ft), Morne Joséphine. It creates two passages into the Bay of les Saintes, la Baleine passage to the East and Pain de Sucre passage in the South, which constitute both access roads to the harbours of Mouillage and Fond-du-Curé.

It is the site of the ruins of the lazaretto and Joséphine Fort.

==== Les Roches Percées ====
An uninhabited island across from the Pompierre Beach, characterized by high rocks abrupt which the erosion dug impressive fractures by which the sea rushes. These faults are at the origin of the naming of the island. It is a natural site classified by French law. The entry and the anchorage of motorboats, as well as sailing boats are strictly forbidden.

==== La Redonde ====
An uninhabited rock at 150 m (0.093 mi) south of Terre-de-Haut Island. It is the northern extremity of Grand-Îlet Passage. It is very difficult to berth on it, the swell there is constantly bad.

==== La Coche ====
At 750 m (0.47 mi) west of Grand-Îlet from which it is separated from it by the Passe des Dames, and on the east of les Augustins by the Passe des Souffleurs. It is about 150 m (0.093 mi) in wide and 800 m (0.50 mi) long. It spreads out in the length from the southeast headland to the northwest headland and is characterized by a coast of abrupt cliffs towards Dominica Passage and a sandy hillside opening on Terre-de-Haut Island.

==== Les Augustins ====
A small group of rocks near la Coche from which they are separated by the Passe des Souffleurs. They are separated from Terre-de-Bas Island by the Southwest Passage, a major shipping lane. The Rocher de la Vierge, is named for the Immaculate Conception.

==== Le Pâté ====
An island in shape of a high plateau at 900 m (0.56 mi) of the northern headland of Terre-de-Bas Island, called Pointe à Vache. It opens the Pain de Sucre Passage, the main shipping lane to access to the Bay of les Saintes by the North. Near the islands, there is an exceptional dive site called sec Pâté. It is a submarine mountain, which the base belongs at less 300 m (980 ft) deep and the top at less than 15 m (49 ft) below sea level. The maritime conditions make this dive difficult and the level 2 is required. The place abounds in a large quantity of diversified fishes, sea turtles, sea fans, corals, gorgonians, lobsters and shellfishes which appropriate the marine domain, around three rock peaks which form the top of the mountain. Fishing of fishes and shells is regulated or forbidden for certain species.

=== Location ===
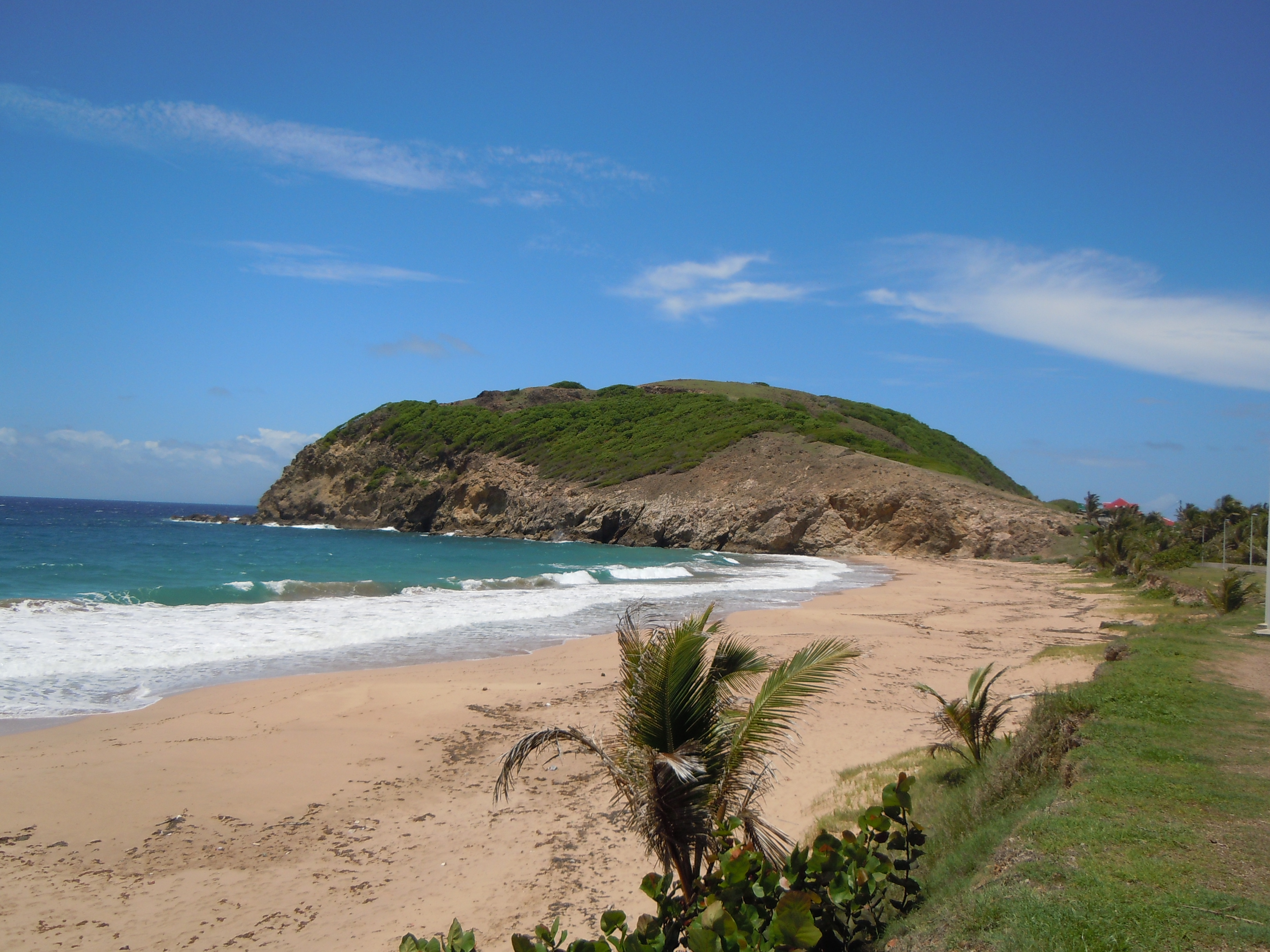
Morne Rodrigue

Les Saintes is a territory of the northern hemisphere situated in North America, in the Caribbean islands, between the Tropic of Cancer and the Equator. The islands lie around 15°51' North, the same latitude as Thailand or Honduras, and 61°36' West, the same longitude as Labrador and the Falkland Islands.

This locality places the archipelago at 6,800 km (4,200 mi) from metropolitan France; at 2,200 km (1,400 mi) from the southeast of Florida, at 600 km (370 mi) from the coast of South America, and exactly at the heart of the arc of the Lesser Antilles.

Les Saintes lies immediately south of the island of Guadeloupe and west of Marie-Galante. It is separated from Guadeloupe by Les Saintes Passage and from the north of Dominica by the Dominica Passage.

- Africa, at 4,650 km (2,900 mi)
- Central America, at 2,250 km (1,400 mi)
- France, at 6,800 km (4,200 mi)
- Venezuela, at 818 km (510 mi)
- New York, at 2,990 km (1,900 mi)
- Rio de Janeiro, at 4,600 km (2,900 mi)
- Barbados, at 330 km (210 mi)
- Puerto Rico, at 560 km (350 mi)
- Guadeloupe, at 14 km (8.7 mi)
- Dominica, at 20 km (12 mi)

=== Climate ===
The climate of these islands is tropical, tempered by trade winds with moderate-high humidity. Despite its location between Guadeloupe and Dominica, the climate of les Saintes is different, and is more dry than its neighbours. It tends to get closer to the climate of St. Barts and most little islands of the Lesser Antilles. The archipelago covers an area of 12.8 km^{2} (4.9 sq mi). Terre-de-Bas, the western isle, is wetter than Terre-de-Haut, the eastern. Though having 330 days of sunshine, the rainfall could reach 900 mm (35 in) but varies very widely. Summer is from May to November which is also the rainy season. Winter, from December to April, is the dry season. Sunshine is very prominent almost throughout the year and even during the rainy season. Humidity, however, is not very high because of the winds. It has an average temperature of 25 °C (77 °F) with day temperatures rising to 34 °C (93 °F). The average temperature in January is 28 °C (82 °F) while in July it is 31 °C (88 °F). The lowest night temperature could be 16 °C (61 °F). The Caribbean sea waters in the vicinity generally maintain a temperature of about 27 °C (81 °F). The archipelago faces frequent catastrophic threats of cyclonic storms.

== Environment ==
Les Saintes extend only over 12.8 km^{2} (4.9 sq mi) but are characterised by a long coast, enriched by those of four small uninhabited islands. The coast of these islands does not have real cliffs, but their rocky shores are covered with corals. The sandy shores are more-or-less colonised by marine spermatophyte plants. In 2008, the inventory of the natural zones of ecological interest, fauna and flora (ZNIEFF) listed zones covering 381 hectares.

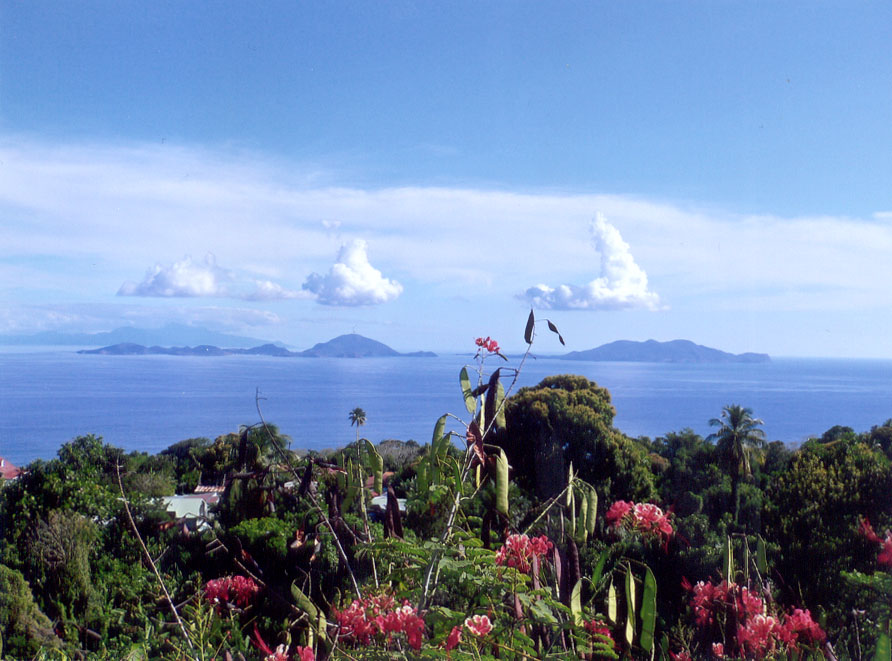
View of Les Saintes from Guadeloupe island

=== Fauna ===
==== Land ====
There are numerous ground iguanas, including the green iguana which is the heraldic symbol of Terre-de-Haut, and the Iguana delicatissima, which is threatened by the appearance of a hybrid stemming from the reproduction between the two species. Other reptiles include the Terre-de-Haut racer, Terre-de-Bas racer, the endemic Les Saintes anole, and a lot of species of anoles.

There are also agoutis, goats, and stick insects.

Birds include the bananaquit, yellow-headed blackbird, dickcissel, blue-headed hummingbird, green-throated carib; purple-throated carib, and blue-tailed emerald.

Ardeidaes rest in salty ponds (snowy egret, green heron, western cattle egret, yellow-crowned night heron, tricolored heron, etc.) and living with the aquatic turtles, the common moorhen, the blue land crab, the blackback land crab, the sand fiddler crab and other species of crabs. The common kestrel is visible and audible during rides into the dry forest, like the zenaida dove, an endemic species of West Indies protected inside the archipelago.

Frogs include the Eleutherodactylus pinchoni, among others.

Tree bats feed on papayas and other fruits and berries.

==== Marine ====
The archipelago shelters a variety of:

- Coral fishes (parrotfish, Cephalopholis, trumpetfish, mero, Epinephelus adscensionis, cardinalfish, damselfish, sergeant major fish, queen triggerfish, sunfish, scrawled cowfish, schoolmaster snapper, groupers, moray eels, conger, green moray, black scorpionfish (venomous), red snapper, balloonfishes, Atlantic blue tang surgeonfish, etc.);
- Pelagic fishes
- Royal spiny lobsters (Panulirus argus) and Brazilian lobsters (Panulirus guttatus)
- Crustaceans (spiny spider crabs, edible crab, shrimp, slipper lobster, etc.)
- Molluscs (bobtail squid, squid, octopuses)
- Shells (Strombus gigas renowned for their flesh, helmet shell, clam, whelks, etc.)
- Sea anemone, seahorse, seaweeds, sea urchin white and black, polyps and other species of cnidarians (jellyfish)
- Corals (diploria, fire corals, etc.) from Caribbean islands, which are prevalent during dives around the archipelago
- Sharks and rays

It is not rare to observe in Les Saintes Passage cetaceans: humpback whales, sperm whales, killer whales, and dolphins, which during their migration reproduce in the warm seas of the Antilles.

Sea birds (magnificent frigatebird, brown booby, masked booby, terns, double-crested cormorant (Phalacrocorax auritus), pelican, petrels) nest on the cliffs and uninhabited islands. In particular, on Grand-Îlet, a natural reserve of the archipelago which houses species of booby found nowhere else on les Saintes: red-footed booby (Sula sula) and blue-footed booby (Sula nebouxii). But in the context of global warming and invasive foreign species implanted by the humans (e.g. red lionfish), the environment and the biodiversity of these islands are considered to be very vulnerable and to be protected. It is therefore recommended that visitors do not take plants or capture animals to avoid disturbing the species in their natural biotope, and do not pollute the ecosystem.

==== Sea turtle protection ====
Numerous species are endemic and strictly protected, listed, and guarded by the Conservatoire du littoral ("Coastal protection agency" ), particularly the sea turtles, in application of the international convention ratified by France. Indeed, les Saintes is the preserve of seven varieties of sea turtle, among which three (those in bold type) lay their eggs on the beaches of the island:

- the **green sea turtle** (Chelonia mydas)
- the flatback sea turtle (Natator depressus)
- the loggerhead sea turtle (Caretta caretta)
- the olive ridley sea turtle (Lepidochelys olivacea)
- the Kemp's ridley sea turtle (Lepidochelys kempii)
- the **hawksbill sea turtle** (Eretmochelys imbricata)
- the **leatherback sea turtle** (Dermochelys coriacea)

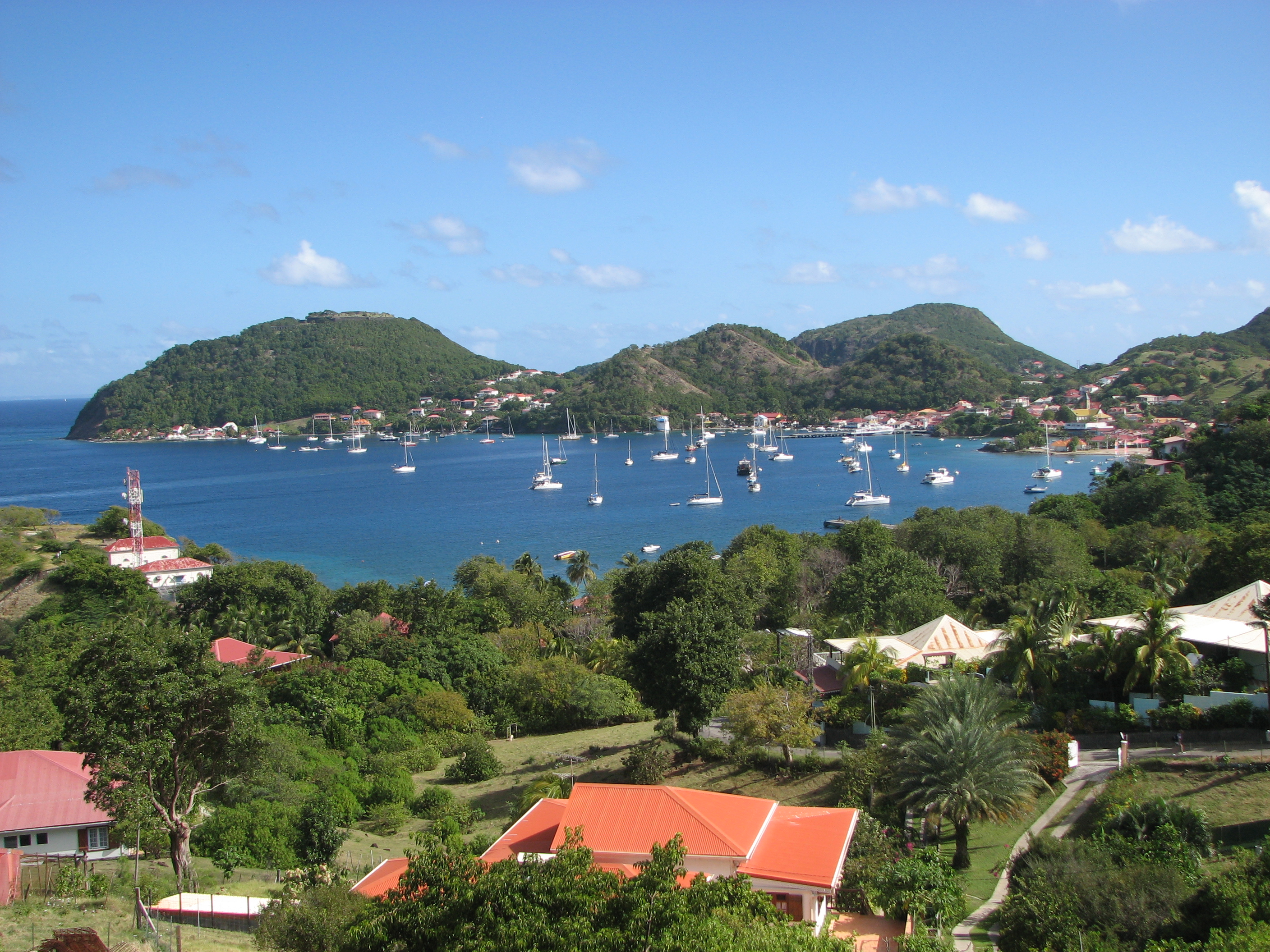
Bay of Les Saintes

=== Flora ===
The flora is typical of the xerophile forests of the volcanic Antilles islands:

- Soapberries
- Tabebuia pallida
- Tabebuia heterophylla
- Eugenia axillaris) – (the fruits of which allow the manufacturing of the local and typical liqueur of wild cherry, apéritif of les Saintes)
- Acerola (Malpighia emarginata)
- Gumbo-limbo (Bursera simaruba)
- Plumeria alba
- Manchineel (Hippomane mancinella) – a toxic tree marked with red lines on their trunks by the Conservatoire du Littoral
- Chinee apple or permseret (Ziziphus mauritiana) the edible fruits of which are used in the manufacturing of a punch softened in white rum.
- Flamboyant red or yellow-flowered (Delonix regia)
- Guapinol (Hymenaea courbaril)
- Tamarind (Tamarindus indica), the fruits of which are used to make one of the specialities of Terre-de-Bas island, called "limbé ", a small home-made candy
- West Indian bay tree (Pimenta racemosa) – much more present on the hills of Terre-de-Bas where the inhabitants use it to make the Bay rum, a rub lotion with curative qualities, the efficiency of which was widely proved in the Antilles. Also, certain species can be used in hair creams, allegedly favouring a fast regrowth and nutrition of hair. The seeds are also used as a spice to perfume dishes. The exploitation of pimenta is assured by the association "Le Mapou" at Terre-de-Bas island, in the medicinal garden "Éloit Germain".

The aridity allowed the establishment of colonies of very diversified cacti and succulents, which the most remarkable are:

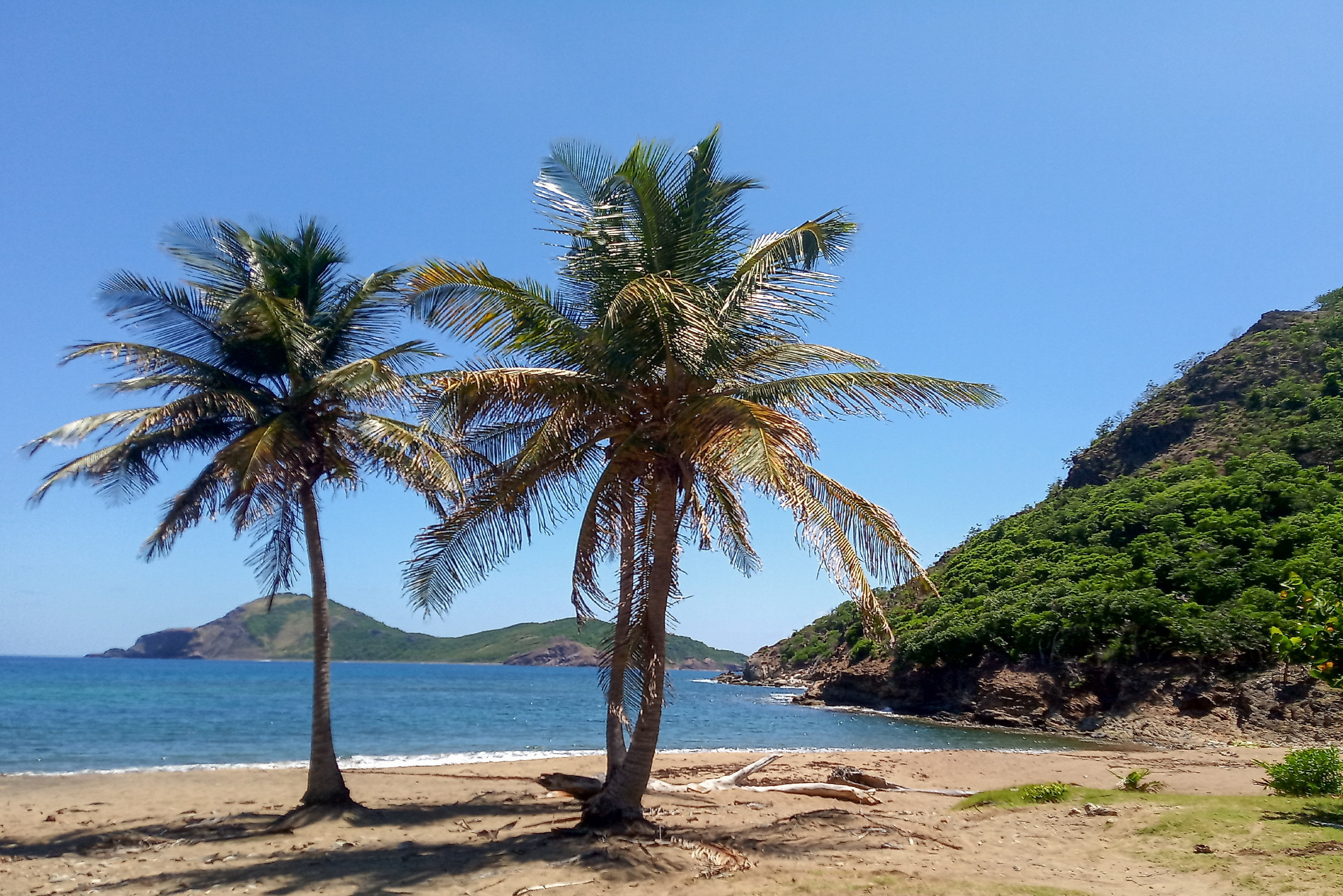
Coconut trees (Cocos nucifera) in Anse du Figuier, Terre de Haut

- Ceroid cacti
- prickly pear (Opuntia ficus-indica)
- Melocactus – which are on the logo of the Tourist information office of the archipelago.
- Aloe

The dry ground of the hills is strewn with herbaceous plants, sometimes composed by urticant lianas (Acalypha arvensis), cat's claw (Uncaria tomentosa), Croton balsamifer, philodendron and fabaceaes (trees with toxic or edible seeds), pigeon peas (Cajanus cajan), sword beans (Canavalia gladiata), Senna alexandrina, margosa or bitter melon (Momordica charantia), Caesalpinia ciliatea, Caesalpinia bonduc (from which children make balls), rosary pea (Abrus precatorius), castor oil plant (Ricinus communis – used in the local small business sector).

The seaside has a vegetation of:

- Yellow, green or orange huge coconut palms
- Baygrape (Coccoloba uvifera)
- Portia tree (Thespesia populnea)
- Paradise plum (Chrysobalanus icaco)
- Muricife (creole term), a variety of edible West Indian olive that has almost disappeared from beaches

Three rare species of orchid grow naturally in the archipelago and are the object of a severe protection:

- Fringed star orchid (Epidendrum ciliare)
- Tolumnia urophylla
- Brassavola cucullata – more rare; endangered on les Saintes

Numerous walking tours were established by the Conservatoire du Littoral through the forest, in such a way to allow observation of these natural resources, the historic ruins of the fortifications, and the exceptional panoramas offered by les Saintes to its visitors.

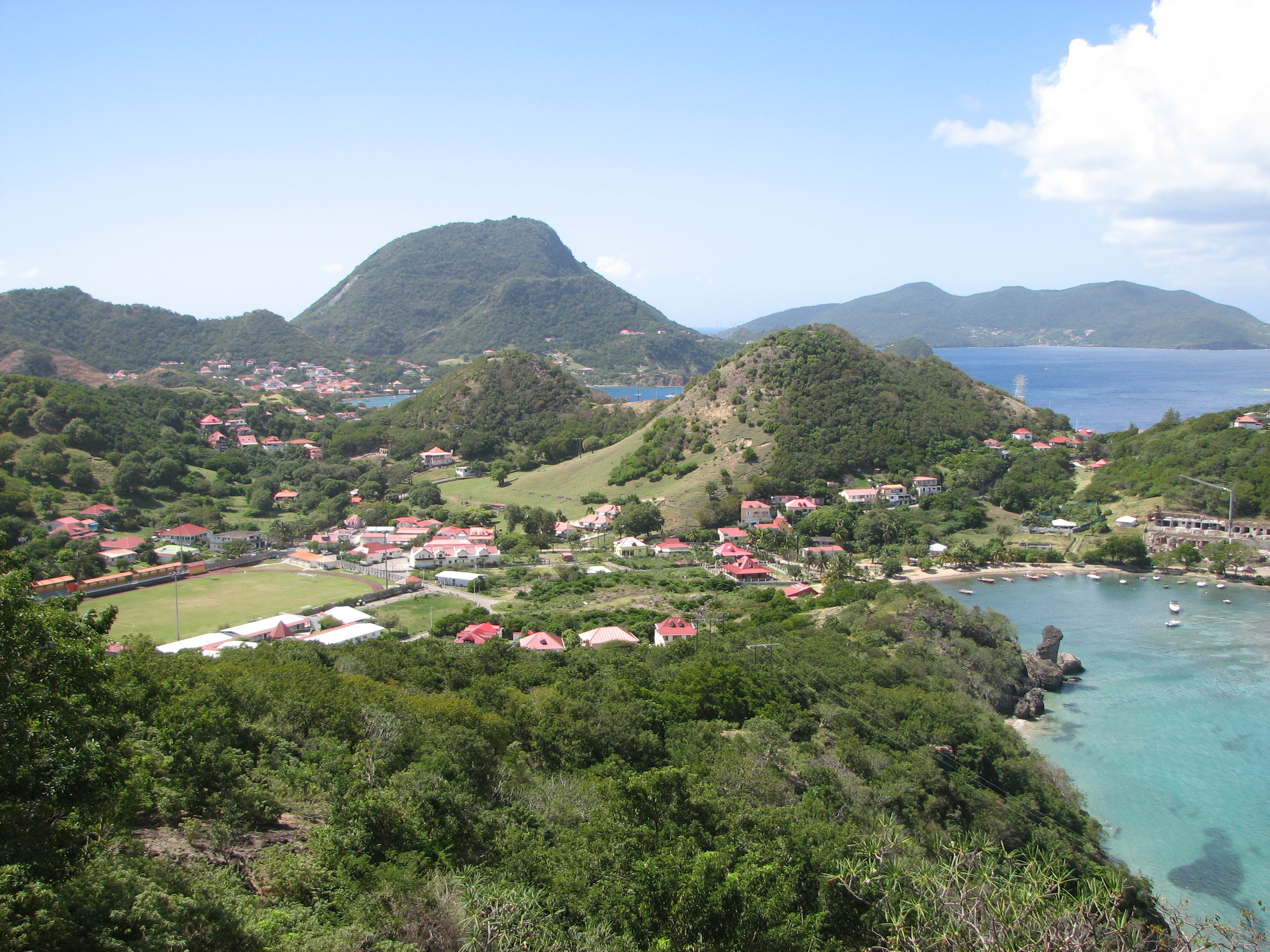
Marigot Bay, Terre-de-Haut

The sand of the beaches is dominantly white or golden, although some zones of black sand remain under the white sand. On the semi-submerged rocks, crabs can be found: Ghost crab (Ocypode quadrata), hermit crab (Pagurus bernhardus), Sally lightfoot (Grapsus grapsus).

=== Environmental and energy policy ===
Numerous things are done to protect this fragile ecosystem at international, national, departmental and municipal level. The International Union for Conservation of Nature and Natural Resources (IUCN) listed several sites of the archipelago and categorised their degree of protection according to the current classification. So, several sites are registered in category IV, as defined by the non-governmental organisation.

During the 1990s, most of the beaches and hills of the archipelago were listed under a decree of biotype protection (Grande Anse beach, Îlet à Cabrit, Morel hill). At the request of the municipality and the Departmental Council, the bays of Pompierre and Pain de Sucre were classified by a French law of 2 May 1930 (relative to the protection of the natural monuments and the sites of artistic, historic, scientific, legendary or picturesque character).

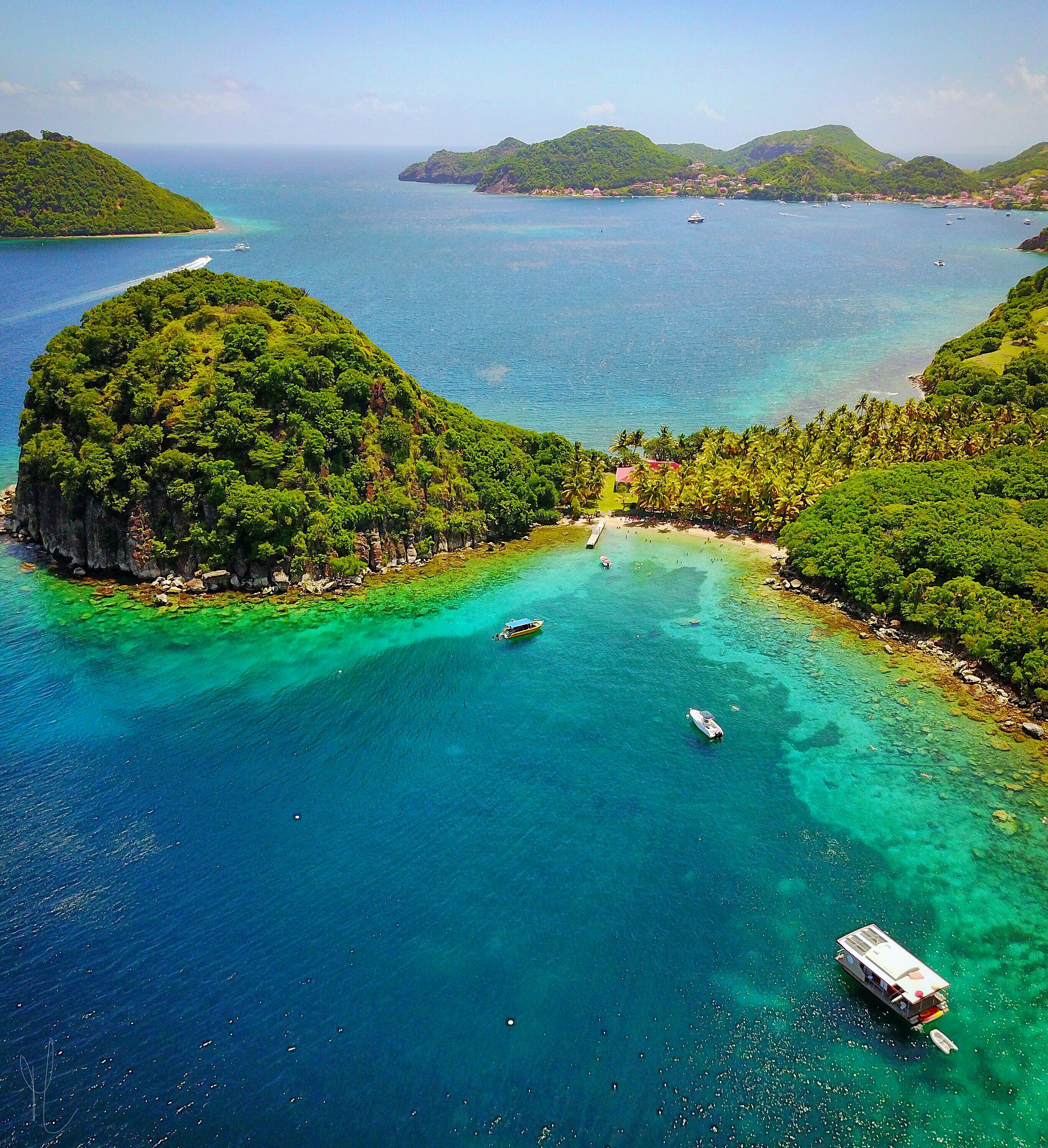
Pain de Sucre, Terre de Haut

The Conservatoire du littoral agency has acquired several areas, in particular Grand Ilet and Chameau hill, under the framework of the national program of protection of natural spaces.

On 31 December 2010, the open-air garbage dump, an environmental problem for the archipelago for a long time, was closed and replaced by waste sorting. Now, waste is compacted and sent by boat to Guadeloupe to be recycled.

Moreover, plastic bags have disappeared from grocers' shops and other businesses on the archipelago. Each municipality helped its inhabitants to change their habits by distributing reusable shopping bags. With these new political measures, les Saintes is more committed to the protection of the environment and its heritage.

Terre-de-Haut, created its local Agenda 21.

In May 2011, anchorage buoys were installed in the bay of Terre-de-Haut to regulate sailing and decrease uncontrolled anchorages which damage the sea bed.

Special guy-wired wind turbines, which could be laid on the ground within forty-five minutes when a hurricane or storm comes, were installed on Terre-de-Bas. In 2007, these seven machines could produce three million kWh a year, allowing Terre-de-Bas, and all the archipelago of les Saintes to be surplus in electricity. Thanks to this, les Saintes can supply electricity to the south of Basse-Terre (Guadeloupe).

== Demographics ==
The inhospitable relief and the low precipitation do not allow the establishment of agriculture. Few slaves were brought onto these islands. The population is constituted historically by Bretons, Normans and Poitevins who settled on the islands to fish, rather than establish plantation slavery, as elsewhere in the Caribbean. This explains the largely European origin of the Saintois French: [sɛtwa], as islanders are called.

In 2017, the population of les Saintes was established as:

Terre-de-Haut: 1,532 inhabitants, with a density of population of 255 inhabitants / km2. The number of households is 676.

Terre-de-Bas: 1,046 inhabitants, with a density of population of 154 inhabitants / km2. The number of households is 429.

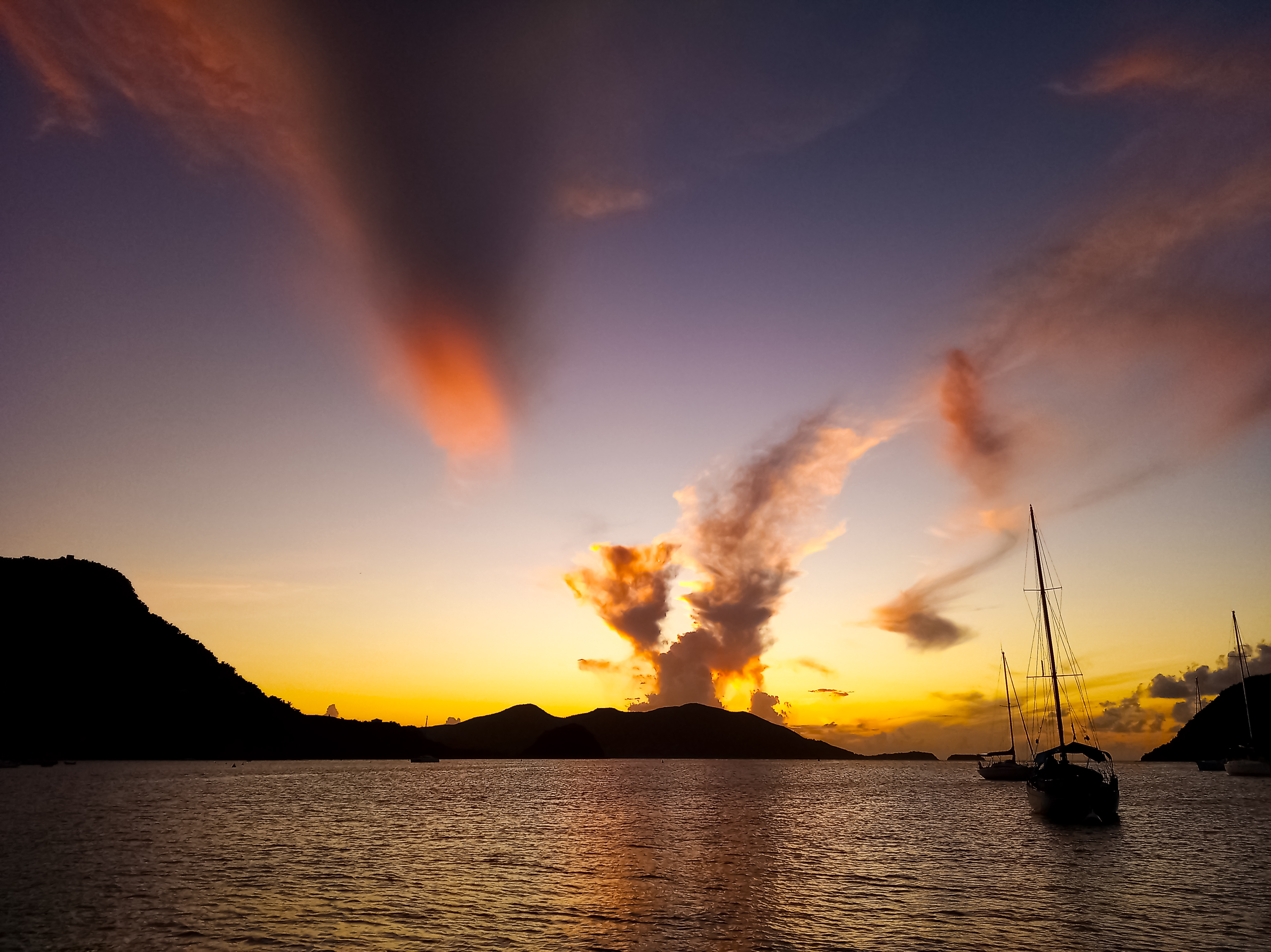
Sunset on Terre-de-Haut

The life expectancy is 75 years for men and to 82 years for women. The average number of children per woman is 2.32.

=== Education ===
There are six primary and secondary schools which welcome the pupils of both municipalities. There are two nursery schools, two primary schools, and two middle schools (colleges). High school and higher education requires the children to go to Guadeloupe, Martinique or France.

=== Public health ===
Terre-de-Haut has two general practitioners, two dentists, four physiotherapists. Terre-de-Bas has a general practitioner. The pharmacy is located on Terre-de-Haut.

The fire brigades are equipped with equipment and vehicles adapted to fight against disasters and to carry assistance.

Other care and specialities are located at Basse-Terre or Pointe-à-Pitre and in case of emergency, the fire brigade can call the helicopter of Sécurité Civile to come from Guadeloupe

=== Languages ===
The archipelago of les Saintes is mostly populated by the descendants of colonists from Brittany and Normandy, Poitou, Saintonge and Anjou, who are mostly from the first French families that lived on Saint Christopher and Nevis when it was a French colony. The population has the peculiarity of being primarily of European origin and speaking a variety of popular American French, with some terms of Old French.

The French of France is the official language and taught in schools. Among the languages of the archipelago, the Creole or patois (dialect) of les Saintes, stemming from the interbreeding of the Europeans and from the Creole influence of the slaves brought into the archipelago, is the most practiced by far.

Les Saintes Creole is a French-based creole language, and is included the category of the agglutinative languages. It differs from those of the neighbouring islands (Guadeloupe, Marie-Galante and Dominica) by its very Gallicised pronunciation. It is close to the Creole spoken on the eastern side of the island of Saint-Barthélemy. Certain phonemes of the French language ([œ], [œ̃], [ø], and [y]) disappeared from the modern creole of Guadeloupe, Dominica and Martinique are found in this dialect.

Contrary to other French Antilles creoles which have diverged from French, Les Saintes Creole is moving toward it, in particular by a hyper-correction of the pronunciation of [r], considered a sign of speaking well. This may be a legacy of the first colonists who considered, by phenomenon of diglossia, the dialect as a secondary language lower than French and tried hard to avoid pronouncing [r] in the Guadeloupean way [w].

There is a second variant of this dialect, caused by the isolated evolution of the groups on two different islands. Terre-de-Haut Island's dialect can be distinguished from that of Terre-de-Bas.

The variant of Terre-de-Bas is the same, with a different accent, and certain expressions which are typical.

Even if the correct French language remains the educational parental priority, there is no generational problem in learning and speaking Creole. However, it is necessary to avoid talking in Creole for people exercising public authority, the elders and unknown people.

There are many other peculiarities of this dialect. Les Saintes creole is still spoken and Saintois are proud of its difference with the other Creoles. Though it is not taught in schools, it is transmitted orally from parents to their children.

== Economy ==
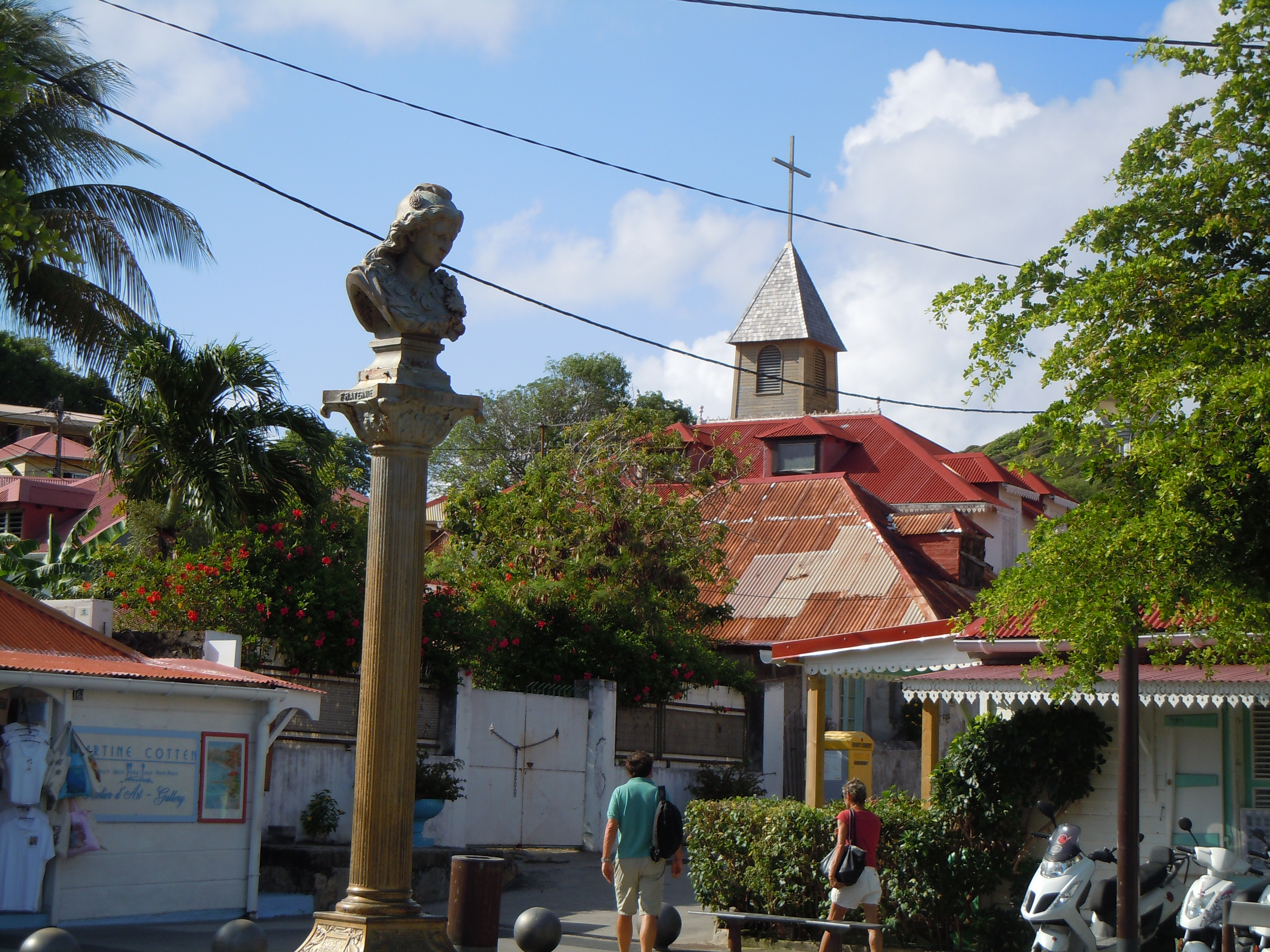
Tourists at Place du Débarcadère

Fishing was for a long time the main activity of les Saintes and is still an important employment sector. The local fishermen are respected throughout the Lesser Antilles for their bravery and their "hauls".

For around thirty years, les Saintes has become a famous place for tourism and this activity underpins the local economy. Terre-de-Haut welcomes numerous boats which cast anchor in the bay of les Saintes, dubbed "one of the most beautiful bays of the world". The hotel business and guest houses have spread, without disturbing this archipelago which has remained wild. The bay attracts luxury yachts, pleasure boats, cruise ships and big sailboats which cross through the Antilles. (84 stopovers of cruise for 2009) Terre-de-Haut annually receives more than 380,000 visitors who frequent businesses of the archipelago.

Agriculture remains underdeveloped on these dry islands.

An economic approach to all the activities is implemented by the National Institute for Statistics and Economic Studies (INSEE) of Guadeloupe. Economic activity remains relatively low, marked by strong disparities between Terre-de-Haut and Terre-de-Bas. The unemployment rate is 16.5% in Terre-de-Haut, and 34.5% in Terre-de-Bas (2017). The working population consists of a great majority of employees and salaried workers and a small percentage of storekeepers and craftsmen. The number of companies in the archipelago was 316 in 2015.

== Culture ==
The landscapes, heritage and scenes of life of Les Saintes inspire many artists, including Pascal Foy and Martine Cotten.

=== Feast days and long-standing customs ===
The calendar of feast days and customs are guided by the Christian feast days. The traditions of the Church are very long-lived in the islands. The public holidays are the same as those of France, plus those specific to the Guadeloupe overseas department and those of Les Saintes.

The Christian feast days (Christmas, Easter, Pentecost) are celebrated by mass in the churches, embellished by the choirs of both parishes. Some feast days have peculiarities:

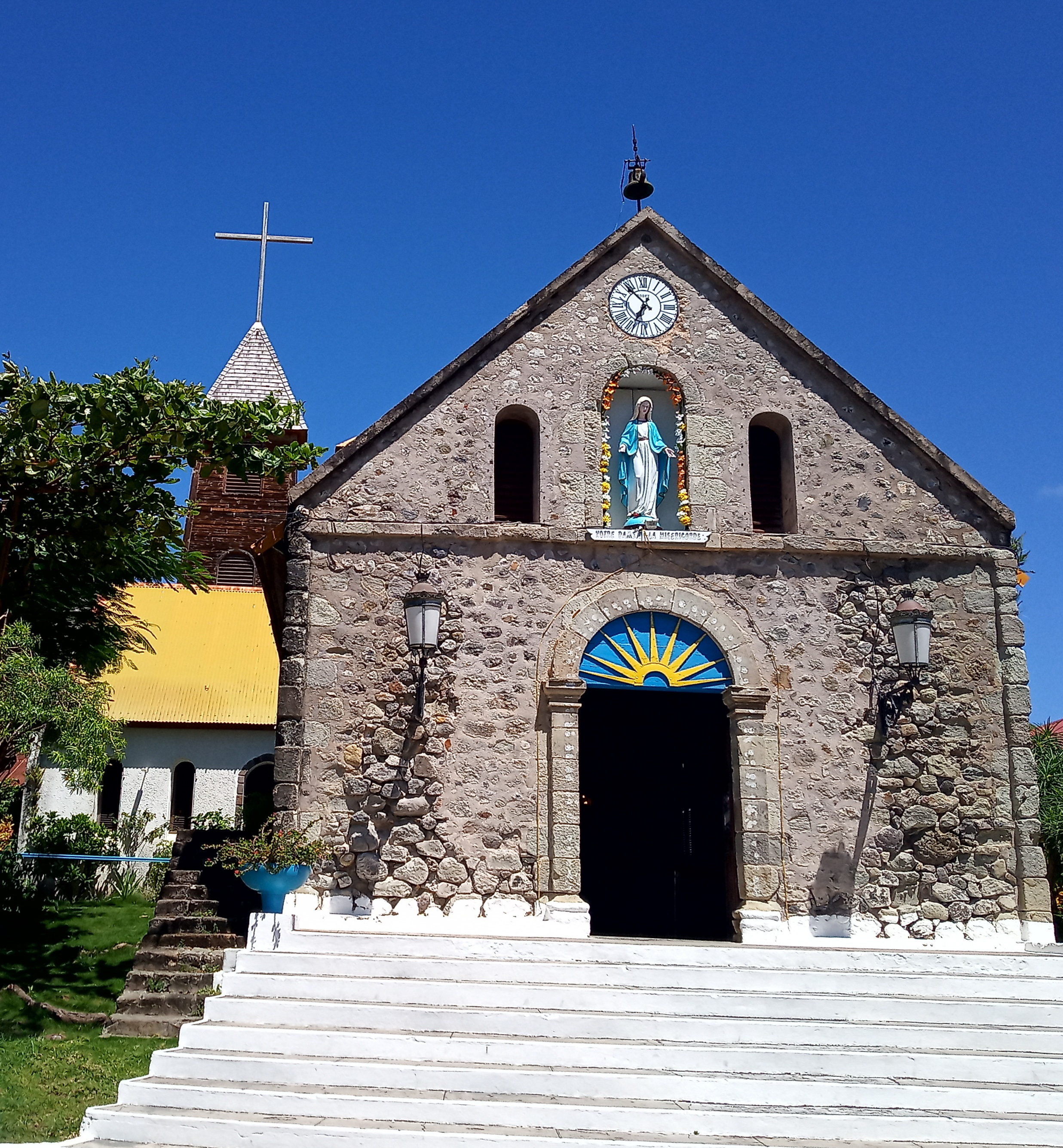
Our Lady of the Assumption Catholic Church (Église Notre Dame de l'Assomption)

- Corpus Christi: The believers follow a procession through the streets of the island with the priest who protects the Monstrance (Blessed Sacrament) covered with beautiful local embroidery to a cave, where there are children dressed as cherubs throwing flower petals. The local residents who liv along the route of procession go out to the entrance of their house, their fishing nets decorated with fruits and flowers, with Christian icons and paintings of The Last Supper (Leonardo da Vinci).
- Fishing and fishermen days: celebrated on 11 June every year with a fishing competition, net making, remembrance of dead fishermen, and dancing.
- Public holidays on 15 and 16 August: August 15th is the patron saint's day of Terre-de-Haut Island (Our Lady of Assumption). The Mayor, his municipal council and officials are dressed as much as the boats in the bay. There are artillery salvos, drum majorettes, a torchlight procession, and bugle reveille. The island celebrates the 15 August 1666 victory of the French fleet against the English occupying the archipelago. A procession with the status of Our-Lady-of-Assumption is led through the streets of the island before ending on the beach where the priest throws a spray of flowers to the sea. It is the signal for the regatta of saintoise sail (traditional boat of les Saintes). A ship of the French Navy is present for the occasion, particularly la Fougeuse a Patrol boat, of which Terre-de-Haut island is the godmother. Officers and sailors wearing their bachis (Seaman (Matelot) and Quartermaster (Quartier-maître) hat in French navy characterised by a small red pom-pom) walk on the island. In the past, French cruiser Jeanne d'Arc (R97) attended the festivities.

16 August is sailors and seamen day. A procession is held in remembrance of dead sailors. The programme is: election of beauty queens, dancing, competitions and fireworks, which begin from 14 August. Today, 15 and 16 August are very famous and are a festival of Caribbean music, where numerous artists attend. Terre-de-Bas island holds its festivities on 8 and 9 August. This is the commemoration of 9 August 1882, the creation of the municipality of Terre-de-Bas.

- Sinterklaas: 6 December is the Patron saint's day of Terre-de-Bas Island (Saint Nicholas). Festival of the island.
- Carnival is celebrated in February by wearing luxurious fancy dresses and masks in the streets under the rhythms of West Indian steel drums for fat days: Saturday, Sunday, Monday (at night in pyjamas), on Fat Tuesday (Mardi Gras) and on Ash Wednesday (wearing black and white, closing the carnival by the burning of the marionette Vaval, King of Carnival). People go to the church after the carnival for liturgical marking with ashes. A traditional mask, known in the creole as Mo-vivant ("zombie"), frightens the children, particularly during Fat Tuesday.

=== Local crafts ===
Crafts are still very prominent on the archipelago, which still produce typical objects:

- the Salako, a traditional hat made from bamboo fibres, probably native of Indochina. It is a conical hat, traditionally covered with white fabric for the top and blue for the bottom, but also dressed in madras fabric; it is manufactured by the craftsmen of Terre-de-Bas.

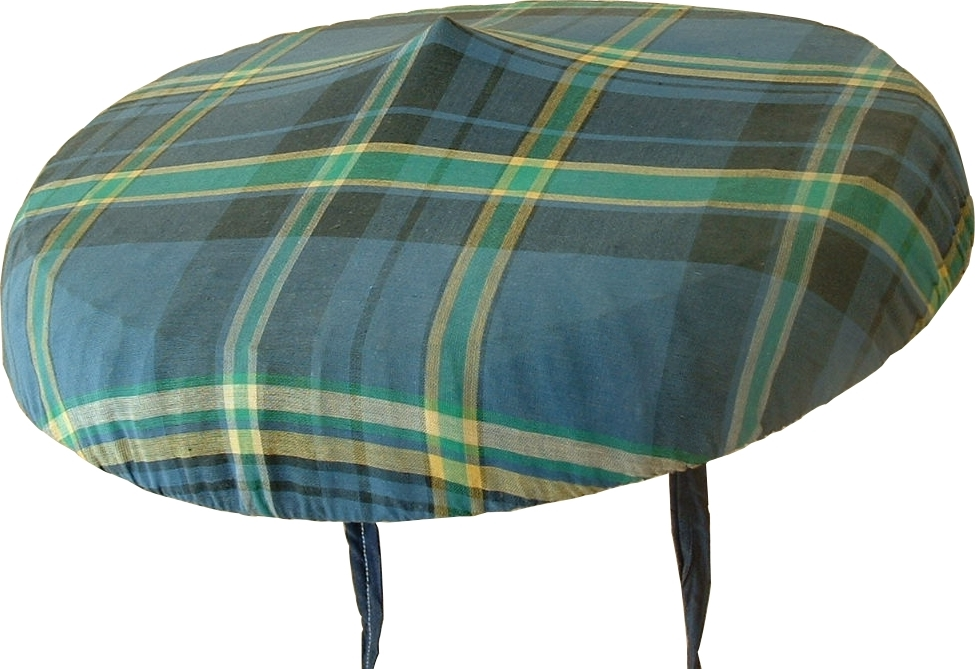
A salako (traditional hat)

- The Saintoise, a fishing boat which is used in all the Lesser Antilles due to its reliability and its manoeuvrability. It is the work of the old marine carpenters of the island who have modernised it by motorising it. Its traditional shape is in veil and wood and is used during regattas today. Guadeloupe took back this tradition of les Saintes, and restored local sailing by creating an annual regatta which takes place in July, the TGVT (Guadeloupe Traditional Sail Tour). The saintoise is built in shipyards which receive orders from numerous Caribbean islands (e.g. shipyard Alain Foy, shipyard Pineau, etc.).
- Embroidery, sewing, crochet, and weaving: coming from Breton and Norman ancestral traditions, the ladies of the island prepare basketwork in latan palm leaves, and sew. As well as parasols, slippers, baby clothes, curtains, place mats, mantillas, beddings and pillowcases embroidered or crocheted by the extraordinary dextrous ladies of the archipelago. Their products are sometimes exhibited in city halls and sold in front of the doors of their residences. The men make bow nets for fishing and weave the bamboo fibres for the bottoms of chairs and rocking chairs.
- Furniture, model making and wooden toys: furniture (beds, sideboards, consoles, rocking chairs), and model boats are created by very skillful carpenters. Marionettes, cars (kabwa in Creole) and wooden traditional spinning tops are made on the island, and are still appreciated by the children.
- The housing environment: Les Saintes is renowned for the charm and the cleanliness of its houses. Everything is minutely detailed: railings, doors with flaps, venetian blinds, the designs, and the decorative friezes covering gutters along the roof. Wood is still the most important material of local crafts.

=== Music ===
Like on all the islands of the Lesser Antilles, music livens up life of the people from les Saintes. The musicians who, in the past, occupied squares to play West Indian and French tunes with their accordions, violins and harmonicas are now replaced by small bands which provide rhythm to the parties and carnivals of the islands. (SOS band, Unison, Mélody Vice, Explosion, etc.)

The traditional music (Creole Quadrille, Biguine, mazouk from Martinique) is still present for the folk balls when the inhabitants wear their traditional costumes and sing the island's creole hymns Viv péyi an nou, viv les Saintes an nou ("Long live our country, long live our les Saintes") or Viv Terre-de-Haut ("Long live Terre-de-Haut") for official occasions such as ministerial visits or the island's patron saint's day on 15 August. Gwo ka music, contrary to on neighbouring Guadeloupe where it comes from, made only brief appearances to les Saintes, and has not integrated into Les Saintes' traditions.

Haitian Compas music and the Guadeloupean combos of the 70s (les Aiglons, la Perfecta, etc.) are very appreciated and are played in all the celebrations of life (marriages, public baptisms, balls, etc.).

The Creole waltz remains the traditional emblem of the opening of the ball for the newlyweds of the archipelago.

Zouk, Salsa, Merengue, Dancehall, French and international varieties of music are popular with young people who dance to these rhythms in bars and clubs. Les Saintes have also inspired the Guadeloupean singer Francky Vincent who dedicated a title to the archipelago: Le tourment d'amour.

=== Cuisine ===
The food of the islands is mainly composed of products of the sea and creole culinary dishes. These include fish Court-bouillon, Colombo (a creole dish of meat spiced with curry, curcuma, saffron and cumin), black pudding, and accras de Morue (saltfish). Some typical specialities are:

- Le "Tourment d'amour": a small tartlet consisting of a pie crust pastry, with jam (traditionally coconut) wholly covered with a sponge cake. These tartlets are very widespread in the archipelago, and are sold at the port to the visitors arriving from the ferries. Every year, for the patron saint's day, a competition for the best and biggest "tourment d'amour" is held. They are now also made with jam of other tropical fruits, e.g. banana, guava, passion fruit and pineapple. Musician Francky Vincent praised these in one of his musical compositions.

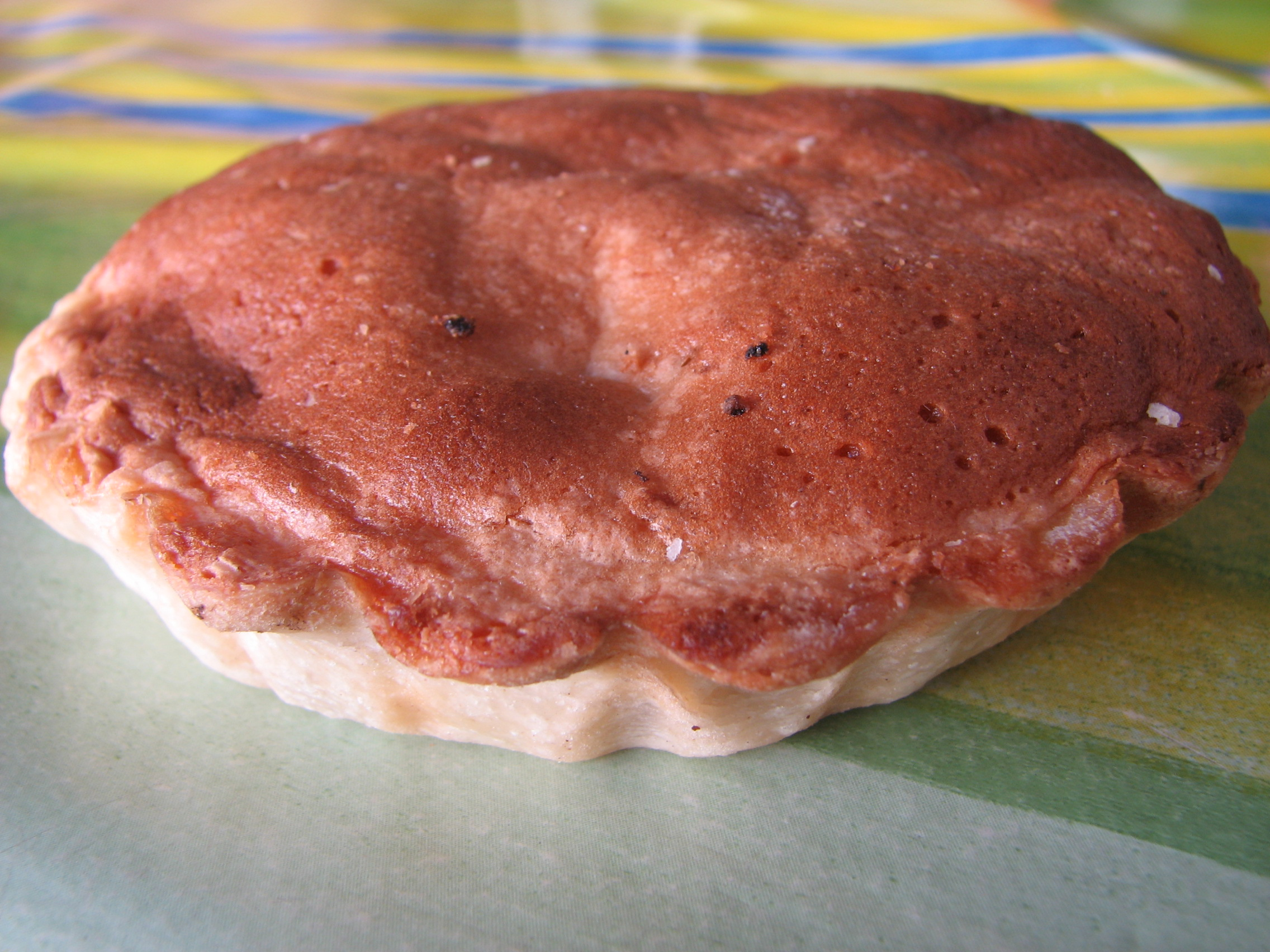
A tourment d'amour (traditional tartlet)

- Fish pancakes: to honour their ancestral roots, les Saintes' people have created a pancake with the peculiarity of being filled by a fish stuffing and a bechamel sauce. It is baked in the oven and covered with dried breadcrumbs.
- Fish cake: a fish terrine, baked in the oven and served fresh.
- "Limbe": a small candy made on the island of Terre-de-Bas with tamarinds, sugar and condensed milk.
- "Fwisu": a special preparation of goat blood, spiced with onion, thyme and garlic, served as a warm starter. It is similar to the Sanquette, a traditional dish of the regions of the South of France.
- "Wog": a kind of local caviar – fish eggs, that les Saintes' people prepare by frying. Mahi-mahi eggs are usually used.
- Eugenia liqueur: small wild berries of les Saintes steeped in white rum to give a liqueur. When aged, it has a bigger flavour. It is considered to be the local wine due to its colour and taste.

== Heritage and historical monuments ==
- "Caroline Artillery battery" (Morel hill) and "Modele Tower" (Chameau hill)
- The French navy cemetery of Terre-de-Haut
- The lighthouse of the port of Terre-de-Haut
- The "Bateau des îles", or the house in the shape of bow of ship (Terre-de-Haut)
- The chapel of the Calvary (Terre-de-Haut)
- The square of the Governor Lion or square of the port, with its coloured houses (Terre-de-Haut)
- The ruins of the old pottery factory of "Grand Baie" (Terre-de-Bas)
- St Nicholas' church (Terre-de-Bas)
- The watchtower and ponds of "Abymes hill" (Terre-de-bas)
- The typical district of Mapou and its factory of bay rum and essence of bay rum tree
- The many beaches (Crawen, Pompierre, Anse Rodrigue, Anse Figuier, Marigot, Anse Mire, Grande-Anse, Anse à Dos, Anse à Cointre, etc.).

== Transport ==
The transport on Terre-de-Haut mainly consists of scooters and motorcycles. Scooter rental companies are available to tourists. Cars are rare.

Small ferries make several daily connections between Terre-de-Bas, Terre-de-Haut, Trois-Rivières (Guadeloupe island), and Basse-Terre.

Other connections, essentially for tourists, are made several times a week to Pointe-à-Pitre, Grand-Bourg (Marie-Galante), Roseau (Dominica) or Fort-de-France (Martinique).

An aerodrome was built on Terre-de-Haut island in 1966. It has runway of 580 m (1,900 ft).

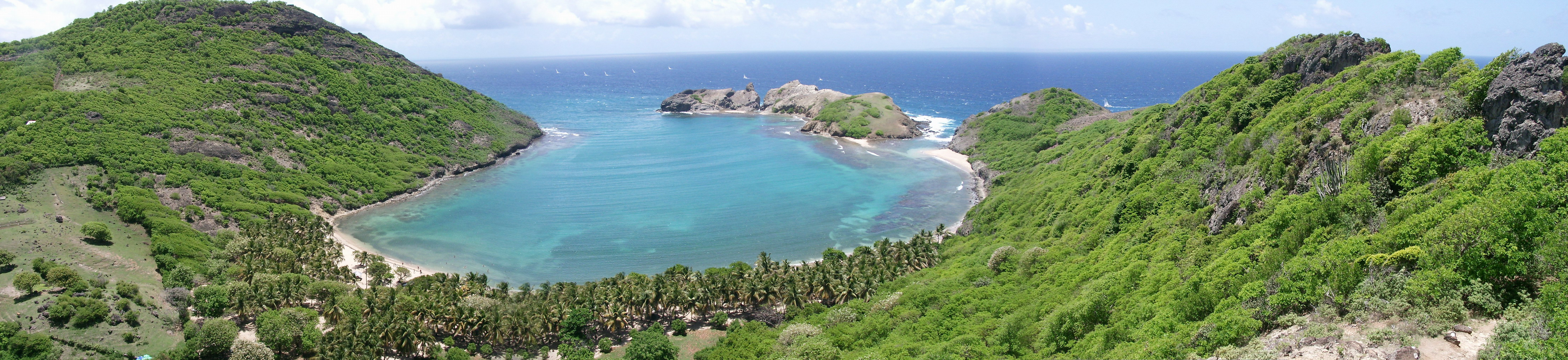
Bay of Pompierre

== See also ==
- French Antilles
- Fort Napoléon des Saintes
