= Les Saintes Passage =

Strait in the Caribbean

- Canal des Saintes (French)
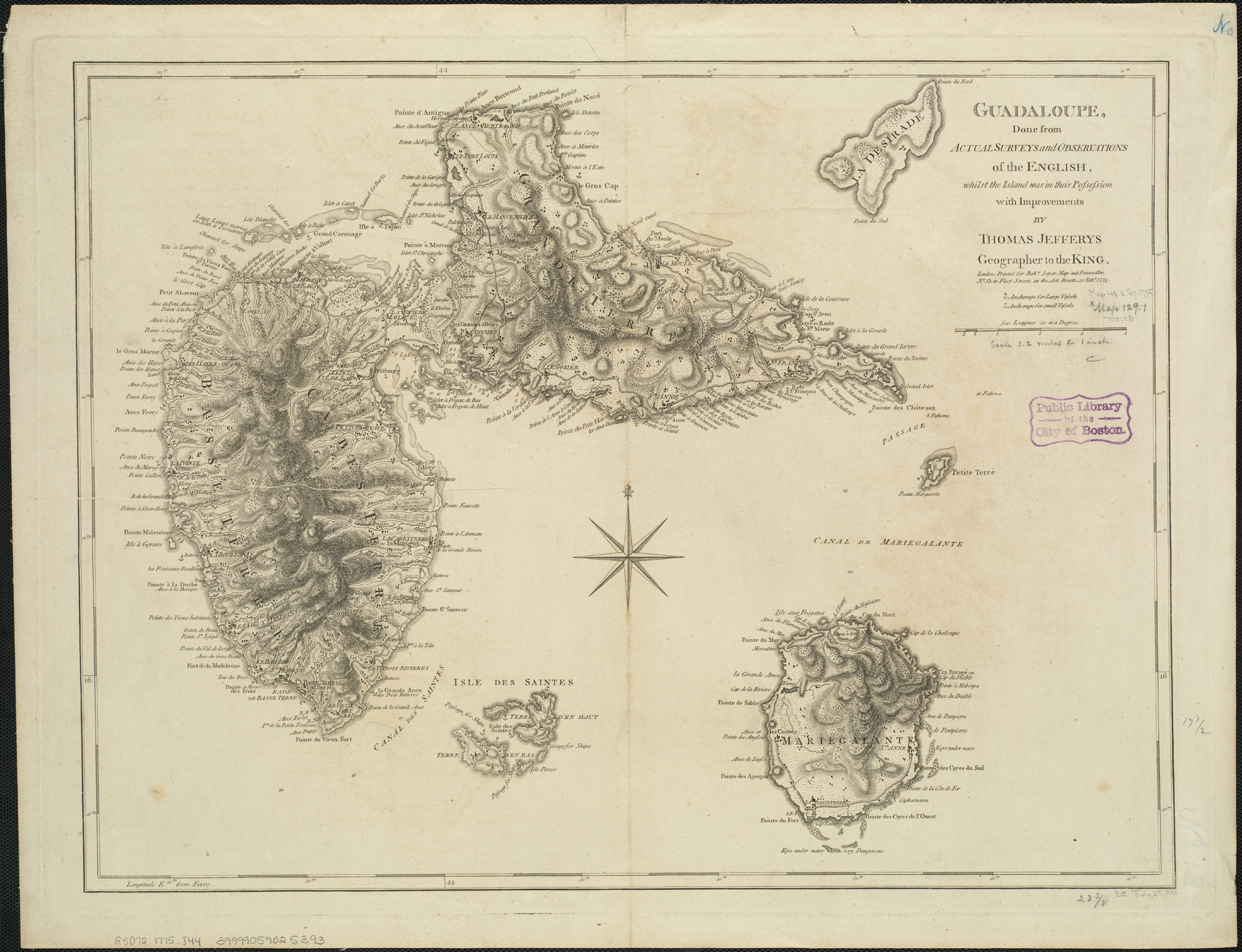
- Les Saintes Passage, located between les Saintes archipelago and Basse-Terre Island, indicated in French on this 1775 map: Canal des Saintes.

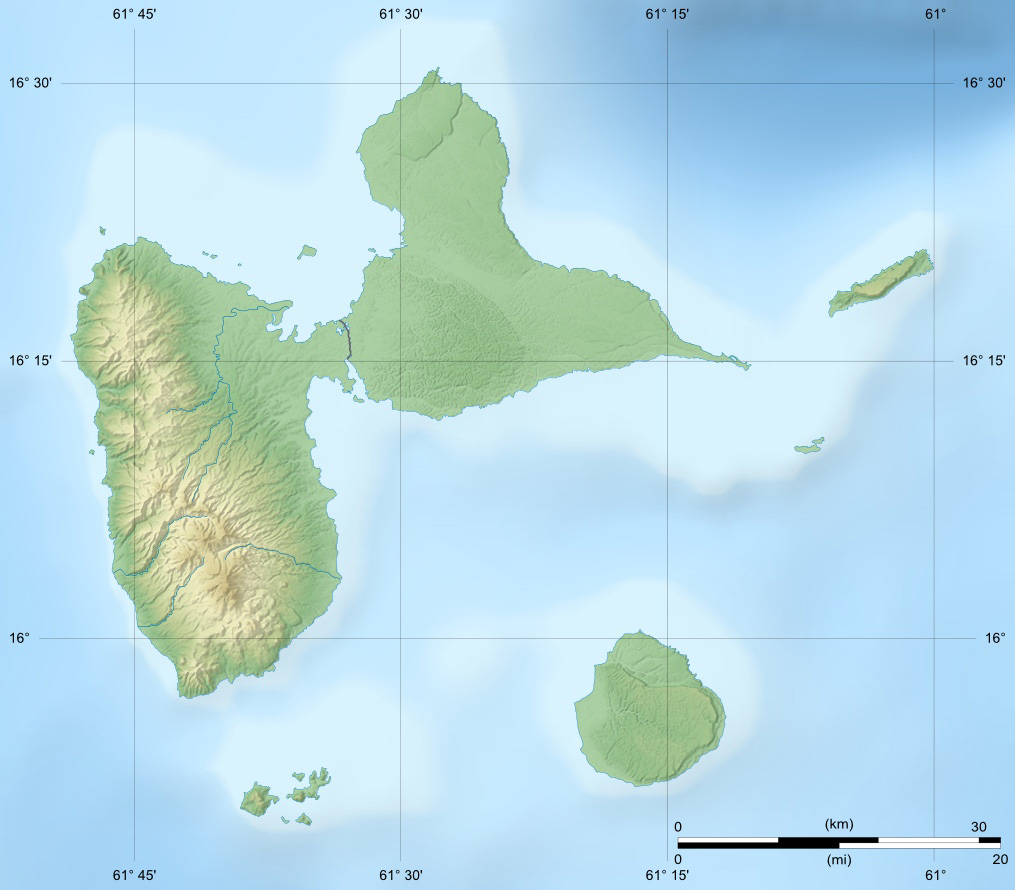
- Location within Guadeloupe Location within Lesser Antilles Location within the Caribbean
- Location: Guadeloupe
- Coordinates: 15°55′16″N 61°38′11″W
- Max. length: 13 kilometres (8.1 mi)
- Max. width: 12.5 kilometres (7.8 mi)

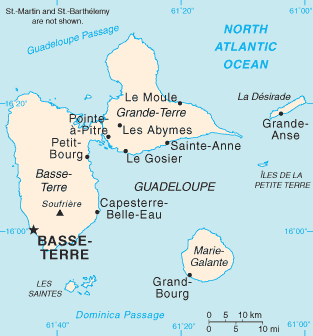
Les Saintes Passage, located between les Saintes and Guadeloupe

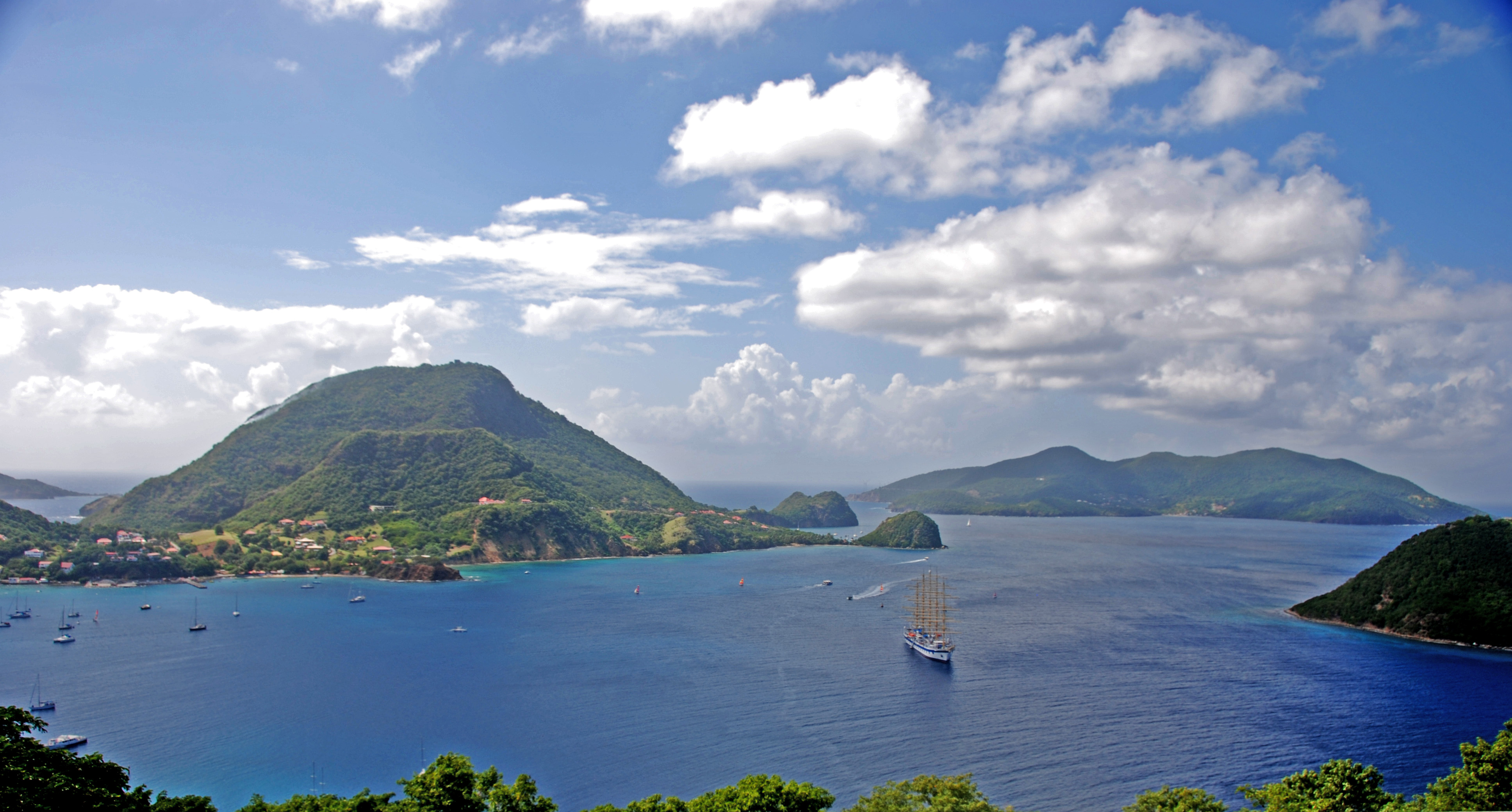
View from Fort Napoleon, Iles des Saintes, Guadeloupe.

Les Saintes Passage (French: Canal des Saintes) is a strait in the Caribbean. It separates the archipelago of Îles des Saintes, from Basse-Terre Island (Guadeloupe).

To ensure control of Les Saintes Passage, France built Fort Napoléon des Saintes.

== History ==
In April 1782, it was the place - as well as the waters separating Guadeloupe from Dominica - of a major naval battle, the Battle of the Saintes, having given the victory to the British Navy, commanded by George Rodney, over the French Royal Navy under the orders of Count of Grasse as part of the US Revolutionary War.

Les Saintes Passage is located in an area of high seismicity related to the subduction zone between the Caribbean Plate and the North American Plate. It is therefore frequently the epicenter of earthquake that strike the south of Guadeloupe and the archipelago of Saintes on November 21, 2004, with significant magnitude of 6.3 on the Richter scale.

== Traffic ==
Mainly frequented by the maritime shuttles which provide the transport between the port of Trois-Rivières and those of Basse-Terre and Terre-de-Haut, the canal is the place of passage of small vessels bound for the port of Basse-Terre as well as those of cabotage towards the port of Pointe-à-Pitre.

In addition, every four years the Saintes Canal is the obligatory passage point for competitors of the Route du Rhum who must leave it in their rear by touring Guadeloupe to reach the arrival in the port. from Pointe-à-Pitre. The passage at the Pointe du Vieux-Fort lighthouse could even have been decisive for the final victory in the 2018 race during which Francis Joyon passing closer to the tip of Vieux-Fort managed to double François Gabart for the final tack and the final sprint, won by only seven minutes.
