= SS France =

SS France may refer to:

- SS France (1854), a French steamship chartered by the French Government during the Crimean War
- SS France (1896), a French liner sunk in 1915
- SS France (1912), a French liner scrapped in 1936, and is the only French ship to be one of the four-funnel liners
- SS France (1960), a French liner; later renamed SS Norway; scrapped in 2008.

== See also ==
- France II
- SS Empress of France
- USS Queen of France
- USS French
