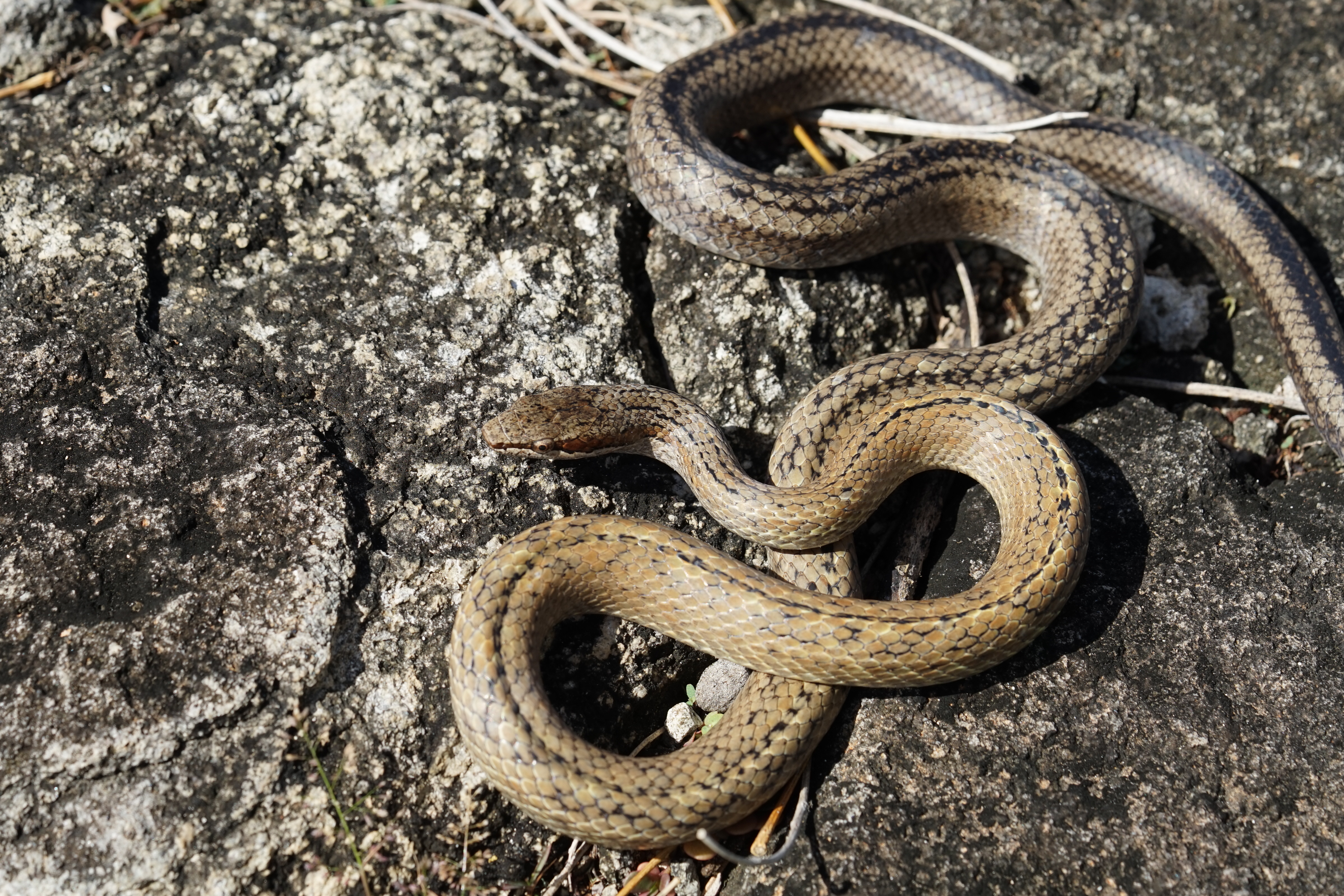

Conservation status
- Endangered (IUCN 3.1)

Scientific classification
- Kingdom: Animalia
- Phylum: Chordata
- Class: Reptilia
- Order: Squamata
- Suborder: Serpentes
- Family: Colubridae
- Genus: Alsophis
- Species: A. sanctonum

Binomial name
- Alsophis sanctonum Barbour, 1915

Subspecies
- A. sanctonum sanctonum Barbour, 1915; A. sanctonum danforthi Cochran, 1938
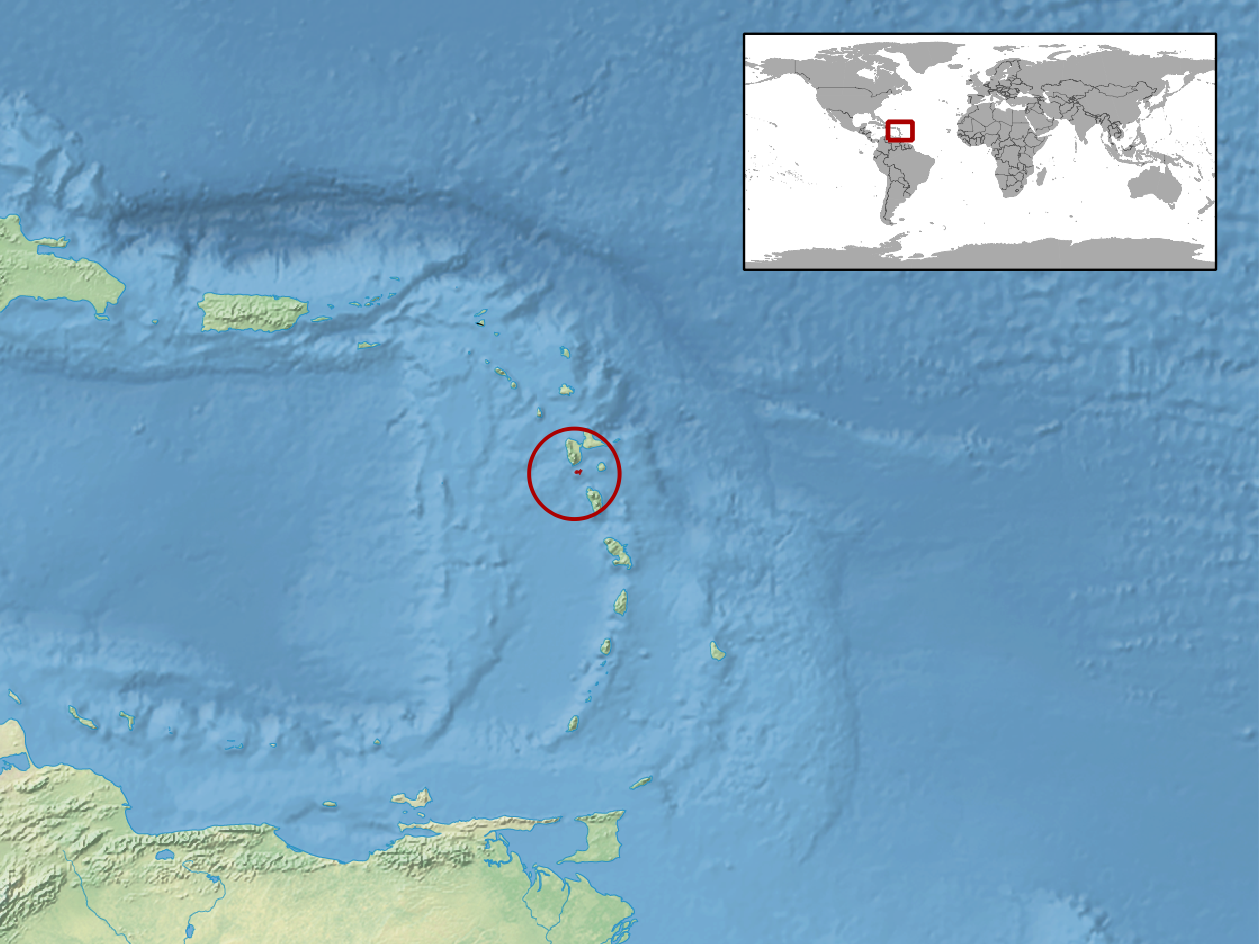

Synonyms
- Alsophis antillensis

= Terre-de-Haut racer =

Species of snake

The Terre-de-Haut racer (Alsophis sanctonum) is a species of snake found in the Caribbean, on the Lesser Antilles. This species is endemic to Terre-de-Bas Island and Terre-de-Haut Island which make up the Îles des Saintes. Terre-de-Bas and Terre-de-Haut are very small islands with a total area of approximately 13 km^{2}. Because of its presence only on this small area, it is a highly protected species.

It can reach nearly a meter in length. It feeds on lizards and small rodents. It rarely bites humans, but may release a foul-smelling (though harmless) cloacal secretion when disturbed.

== Habitat ==
Alsophis sanctonum occurs along mangrove edges, roadsides, gardens, wooded areas, preferentially in semi-deciduous forest with Pimenta racemosa, Pisonia subcordata, Guapinol, and Bursera simaruba. It is present in areas less frequented by humans.

== Subspecies ==
- A. sanctonum sanctonum Barbour, 1915 or Terre-de-Haut racer.
- A. sanctonum danforthi Cochran, 1938 or Terre-de-Bas racer.
