= Saintoise =

Fishing boat without a deck

The saintoise (French pronunciation: [sɛ̃twaz]; Antillean Creole: Sentwaz) or canot saintois (literally: dinghy from les Saintes) is a fishing boat without a deck, traditionally maneuverable with the sail or the ream. It is native to the les Saintes archipelago where it spread throughout the Lesser Antilles. The saintoise is an integral part of the heritage and the cultural identity of the archipelago. The practice of using sailing saintoises developed quickly in Guadeloupean water sports since 2001 when it officially became a new sport, the traditional sailboat racing.

== Description ==
The traditional saintoise is constructed from several types of wood to create the hull (spruce for the keel, mahogany for the edges and the floor, Tabebuia pallida for members and bow). Sails (foresail and mainsail) are linked to the mast and the boom (in bamboo) by lianas called ailes de ravèt (literally: cockroach wings). The boom is longer than the mast. The boat is ballasted by rocks and is navigated by a crew of at least five persons, maintaining speed doing trapeze.

Numerous shipyards exist today in les Saintes, Guadeloupe and la Désirade.

== Origin ==
The traditional saintoise was created by ship carpenters from the Brittany province of France, who settled in les Saintes around the 18th century, and needed a small fishing boat. It is perfectly crafted to sail in the Caribbean Sea; its hollow and slender shape added to the jib and the mainsail allow it to efficiently navigate close-hauled.

Upon the arrival of outboard motors in the 1960s, Alain Foy, a shipbuilder from Les Saintes, adapted the boat to the new technology and created the motor-driven saintoise. It spread rapidly among the fishermen of the Lesser Antilles, mainly in Guadeloupe, Dominica, Martinique, la Désirade, Marie Galante, Saint-Barthélemy and Saint-Martin where it replaced the unstable Gommier, a traditional dugout fishing boat. The hull became more stable and adapted to the weight of the engine. Today, hulls previously crafted in wood are made in composite materials as well.

== Water sports ==
After a long time being mainly used for local regattas in the natural bay of Les Saintes, traditional saintoise sailboat racing became a popular sport in Guadeloupe and quickly became more democratic since the creation of the tour of Guadeloupe in Saintoise (T.G.V.T) in July, 2001. Its success has been growing each year.

It has also become very popular in Saint-Barthélemy and les Saintes, where there are organized regattas during the Patron saint's day of these islands.
