= Empress of France =

Empress of France or Empress of the French may refer to:

== People ==
- Joséphine de Beauharnais, first wife of Napoleon I
- Marie Louise, Duchess of Parma, second wife of Napoleon I
- Eugénie de Montijo, wife of Napoleon III

== Ships ==
- SS Empress of France
  - RMS Empress of France 1914-1928
  - RMS Empress of France 1928-1960

== See also ==
- List of French monarchs
- List of French consorts
- List of Frankish queens
- Queen of France
