= RMS Empress of France =

Two ships of Canadian Pacific Steamships (CP) have been named Empress of France:

- RMS Empress of France (1914) was an Allan Line passenger and cargo ship, originally named SS Alsatian when she was launched in 1912. The vessel was converted as an armed merchant cruiser during the First World War. Her name was changed to Empress of France in 1919. She was taken out of service in 1931.
- RMS Empress of France (1928) was a CP passenger liner and cargo ship, initially named SS Duchess of Bedford when she was launched in 1928. The Duchess served as a troop ship during the Second World War. The name of this ship was changed to Empress of France during her post-war refit in 1947. She was taken out of service in 1960.

== See also ==
- Empress of France (disambiguation)
- USS Queen of France
