= Dominica Passage =

Strait in the Caribbean

- Location between the French archipelago of Guadeloupe to the north and Dominica to the south.
- Location within Lesser Antilles Location within the Caribbean
- Location: Guadeloupe; Dominica
- Coordinates: 15°45′N 61°30′W
- Max. length: 36 miles (58 km)
- Max. width: 16 miles (26 km)

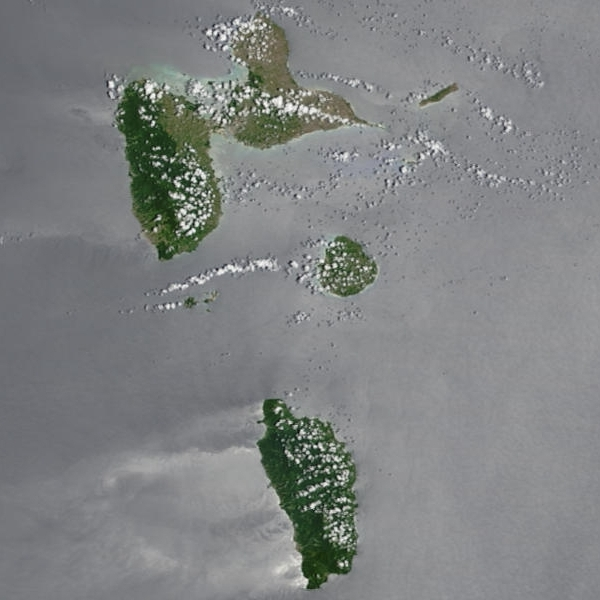
Dominica island, an independent republic state island, between Guadeloupe and Martinique, 2 oversea departments of the French Republic

Dominica Passage is a strait in the Caribbean. It separates the islands of Dominica, from Marie-Galante, Guadeloupe. It is a pathway from the Caribbean Sea into the Atlantic Ocean.

== See also ==
- Dominica–France Maritime Delimitation Agreement
