= Grand Bay =

Grand Bay is the name of more than one place:

Communities

- Grand Bay, Alabama, United States
- Grand Bay, Dominica (officially known as Berekua)
- Grand Bay, Grenada, a village in Carriacou island
- Grand Bay, Mauritius
- Grand Bay–Westfield, New Brunswick, Canada
- Grand Bay (Newfoundland and Labrador), Canada

Water bodies

- Grand Bay (Georgia), a swamp in the United States
- Grand Bay (New Brunswick), Canada

Political constituencies

- Grand Bay (Dominica constituency), electoral district in Dominica

== See also ==
- Grand Baie, Mauritius
- Grand-Baie, les Saintes, Guadelope
- Grande-Baie, Quebec, Canada
