= 2004 Les Saintes earthquake =

Earthquake affecting Guadeloupe and Dominica, Leeward Islands

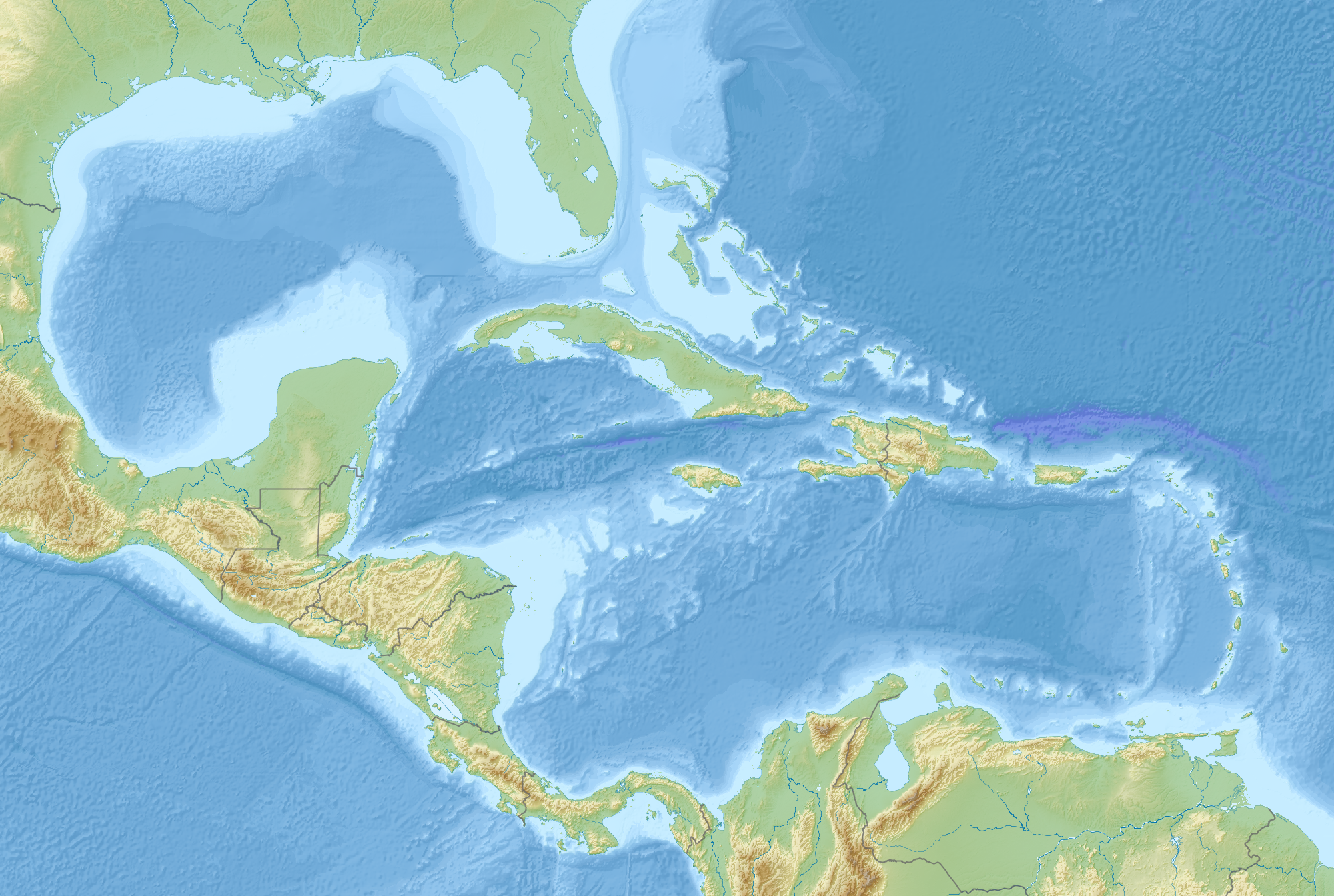
- Location within Lesser Antilles Location within Middle America
- UTC time: 2004-11-21 11:41:07
- ISC event: 7439677
- USGS-ANSS: ComCat
- Local date: November 21, 2004
- Local time: 07:41:07
- Magnitude: 6.3 M_{w}
- Depth: 13 km (8 mi)
- Epicenter: 15.68°N 61.7°W
- Fault: Roseau Fault
- Type: Oblique-normal
- Total damage: Moderate
- Max. intensity: EMS-98 VIII (Heavily damaging)
- Peak acceleration: 0.21 g
- Tsunami: 2 m (6.6 ft)
- Aftershocks: 5.8 M_{w} Feb 14, 2005
- Casualties: 1 dead, 13 injured 40 displaced

The 2004 Les Saintes earthquake occurred at 07:41:07 local time on November 21, 2004, with a moment magnitude of 6.3 and maximum European macroseismic intensity of VIII (Heavily damaging). The shock was named for Îles des Saintes "Island of the Saints", a group of small islands to the south of Guadeloupe, which is an overseas department of France. Although it occurred near the Lesser Antilles subduction zone, this was an intraplate, normal fault event. It resulted in one death, 13 injuries, and 40 people being made homeless, but the overall damage was considered moderate. A small, nondestructive tsunami was reported, but run-up and inundation distances were difficult to measure due to a storm that occurred on the day of the event. Unusual effects at a volcanic lake on Dominica were also documented, and an aftershock caused additional damage three months later.

== Tectonic setting ==
While the northern and southern boundaries of the Caribbean plate are complex and diffuse, with zones of seismicity stretching several hundred kilometers across, the eastern boundary is that of the Lesser Antilles subduction zone. This 850 km (530 mi) long subduction zone lacks a uniform curve and has an average dip of 50–60°. The largest known earthquake on the plate interface was a M7.5–8.0 event in 1843, but it did not generate a large tsunami. In opposition, the three largest events between 1950 and 1978 were intraplate normal faulting events.

== Earthquake ==
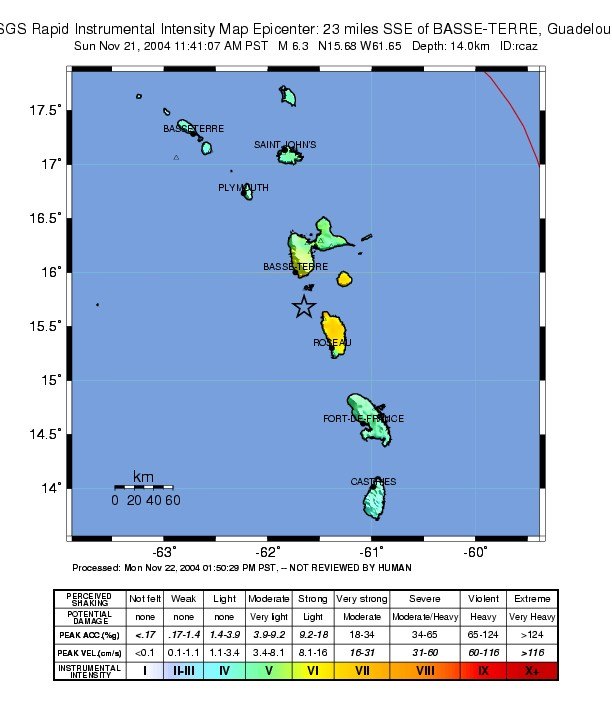
USGS ShakeMap for the event

The mainshock and the primary aftershock occurred on the previously mapped Roseau Fault, a 15 km (9.3 mi), northeast-dipping normal fault that forms the western portion of the northwest-trending Les Saintes channel graben within the overriding North American plate. Late 1990s bathymetric studies showed that it had vertical fault scarps approaching 120 m (390 ft). The type of slip was primarily extensional, but included a small amount of left-lateral slip, and may have contributed to hydrological/volcanic effects that were observed on the island of Dominica, where a flooded fumarole drained twice.

=== Damage ===
A maximum intensity of VIII (Heavily damaging) on the European macroseismic scale was recorded at Terre-de-Haut, where some serious damage occurred to a school, a church, and some homes near the sugar loaf. The same intensity was observed at Terre-de-Bas, where damage was moderate and non-structural in nature. At Petite-Anse, a small area contained some damaged walls, but no complete collapses occurred. At Grand-Bourg on the island of Marie-Galante (where the intensity was deemed to be VI–VII (Slightly damaging–Damaging)) the town hall, a church, and a college were red-tagged (unsuitable for use). The same intensity was assigned to the nearby commune of Saint-Louis, where the newly built town hall had visible cracks and the church was closed due to the potential of aftershocks breaking stained glass windows.

=== Boiling Lake ===
In the weeks following the mainshock, no abnormal geochemical or seismic activity was observed at La Grande Soufrière (an active stratovolcano) on Guadeloupe, but on southern Dominica near the Valley of Desolation, a flooded fumarole known as Boiling Lake was discovered empty by tourists on Christmas Day. The 10–15 m (33–49 ft) deep lake lies in an active geothermal area and is normally stable in terms of temperature (80–90 °C (176–194 °F)) and water level. By mid-February, the lake was full again, but its temperature had not returned to normal. The water level dropped again following the M5.8 aftershock on February 14.

=== Aftershocks ===
By mid-February, aftershock activity had essentially ceased, with events becoming increasingly far apart. On February 14, a strong and slightly damaging aftershock occurred. This was also a normal slip event that occurred about 7 km (4.3 mi) northwest of the November 21 mainshock. The damage was minimal, with cracks developing on the roads, some broken water pipes, and wall and roof damage—including at some locations that were damaged during the mainshock.

== Tsunami ==
A small tsunami took place following the shock, and while no tide gauges captured the event, scientists were on scene several days later to investigate. A large storm occurred on the day of the event, and this might have prevented visual observation of the tsunami, but witnesses on Guadeloupe reported the sea level dropped "a few" to as many as 50 cm (20 in). At Anse des Mûriers on Îles des Saintes, a ship captain reported that three minutes after the earthquake the sea dropped about 80 cm (31 in) and also receded from the coast about 5 m (16 ft). In Anse Rodrigue, the tsunami had a run-in distance of 42 m (138 ft). Investigators documented a 50 cm (20 in) run-up at Anse Pajot, but these findings were difficult to distinguish from the storm surge. A maximum run-up of 2 m (6.6 ft) was recorded at Grande-Anse beach and L'anse Rodrigue on Terre-de-Haut Island, and on Grande-Anse Terre-de-Bas Island. The tsunami was recorded as far as 30 km (19 mi) from the epicenter, at Capesterre-Belle-Eau.

== See also ==
- Geography of Dominica
- Lesser Antilles
- List of earthquakes in 2004
- List of earthquakes in the Caribbean
