= New Brunswick School District 08 =

Former school district in New Brunswick, Canada

School District 8

Location
- Saint John, New Brunswick Saint John, Grand Bay-Westfield, Fundy-St. Martins, Brown's Flat), Maces Bay, New Brunswick. Canada

District information
- Schools: 36

Students and staff
- Students: 13,000

Other information
- Website: www.district8.nbed.nb.ca

School District 08 is a defunct Canadian school district in New Brunswick. It was an Anglophone district operating 36 public schools (gr. K-12) in Saint John and parts of Kings and Queens Counties. Enrollment was approximately 13,000 students. District 08 is headquartered in Saint John. In 2012 it was amalgamated into Anglophone South School District.

== List of schools ==
=== High schools ===
- Harbour View
- Saint John High
- Simonds High
- St. Malachy's Memorial
- Woodlawn Alternative Learning Centre

=== Middle schools ===
- Barnhill Memorial
- Bayside
- Beaconsfield
- Lorne
- River Valley

=== Elementary schools ===
- Bayview
- Brown's Flat
- Centennial
- Champlain Heights
- Glen Falls
- Grand Bay
- Havelock
- Inglewood
- Island View
- Lakewood Heights
- Loch Lomond
- M. Gerald Teed Memorial
- Morna Heights
- Seawood
- St. Patrick's
- St. Rose
- Westfield School

=== Combined elementary and middle schools ===
- Forest Hills
- Fundy Shores
- Hazen-White-St. Francis
- Millidgeville North
- Prince Charles
- Princess Elizabeth
- St. John the Baptist/King Edward
- St. Martins
