= Le Mapou, Terre-de-Bas =

Le Mapou
- Quartier
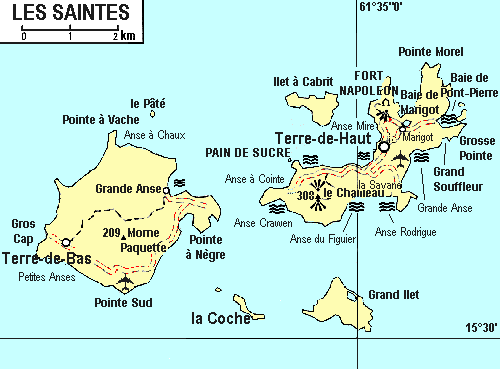
- Coordinates: 15°51′00″N 61°38′49″W
- Country: France
- Overseas department: Guadeloupe
- Canton: les Saintes
- commune: Terre-de-Bas

Le Mapou (French pronunciation: [lə mapu]) is a quartier of Terre-de-Bas Island, located in Îles des Saintes archipelago in the Caribbean. It is located in the eastern part of the island. The ancient port of the island was located at this place.

== To See ==
- The Salako manufacturer.
- The medicinal garden "Éloit Germain" and the exploitation of West Indian bay tree.
