= Petite-Anse, Terre-de-Bas =

Petite-Anse
- Quartier
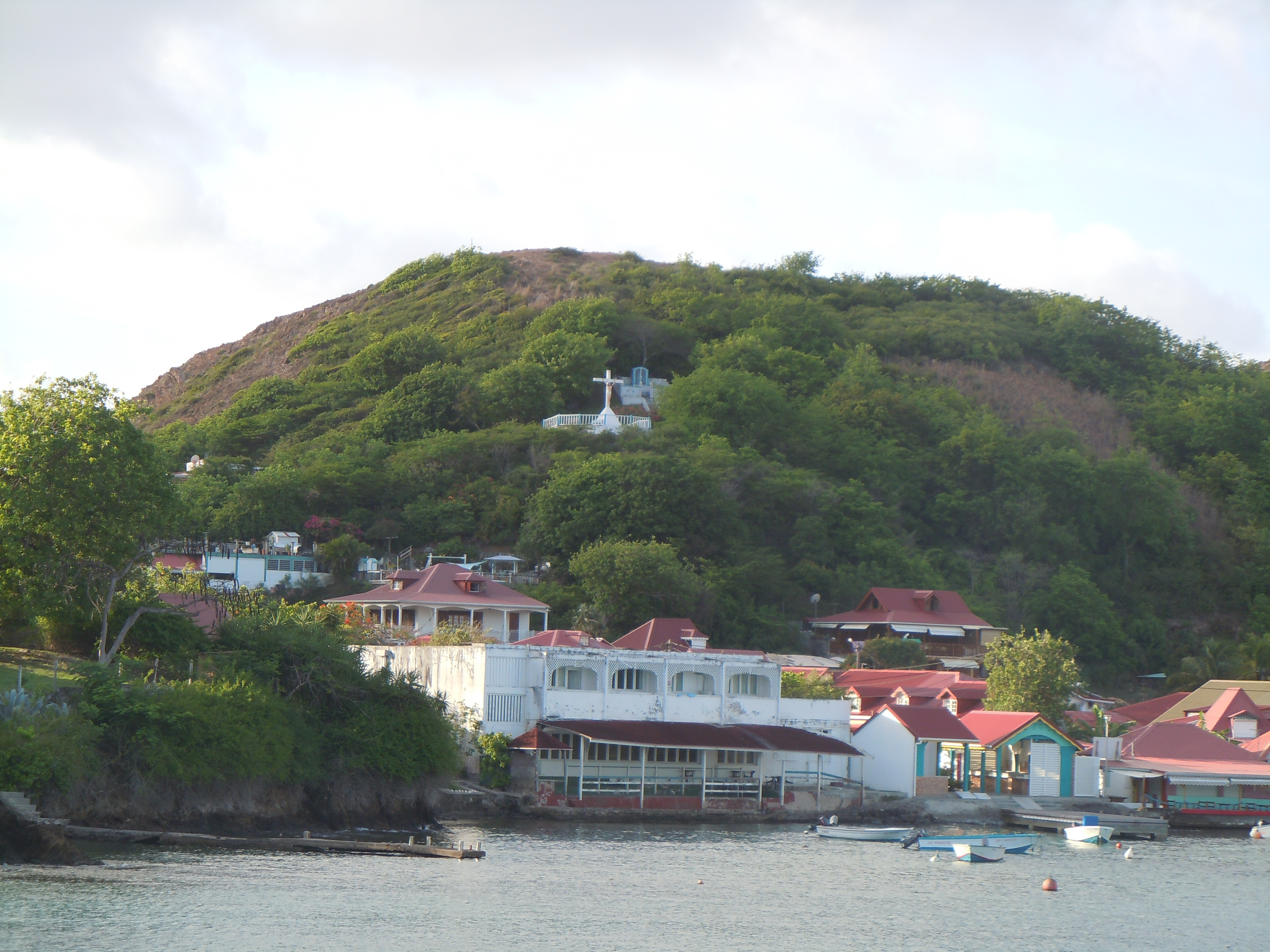

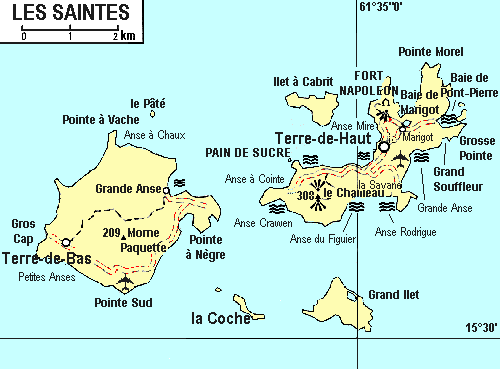
- Coordinates: 15°51′18″N 61°36′59″W
- Country: France
- Overseas department: Guadeloupe
- Canton: les Saintes
- commune: Terre-de-Bas

Petite-Anse (French pronunciation: [pətitɑ̃s]) is a quartier of Terre-de-Bas Island, located in Îles des Saintes archipelago in the Caribbean. It is located in the western part of the island. The commercial activity of the island are focused on this village, shops, market, bakeries, groceries, restaurants, and bars. It hosts the majority of the administrative office of the island, the Post office, the community clinic, and the Mairie (City hall) of Terre-de-Bas.

== Attractions ==
- The square of 9 août 1882: The main place of the quartier, located in front the city hall. It is a lively and flowery place.
- Saint-Nicholas' church: An ancient Roman Catholic church. The front of the church was rebuilt after its collapsing because of the earthquake of 21 November 2004 as well as the city hall.
