= Grande-Anse =

Grande-Anse, Grand'Anse, or Grand Anse is a proper name that may refer to several places:

- Grande-Anse River, Haiti
- Grand'Anse (department), an administrative subdivision of Haiti
- Grande-Anse, New Brunswick, a village of New-Brunswick, Canada
- Grande Anse, Nova Scotia, Canada
- Grande-Anse, Quebec, a hamlet in Mauricie, Québec, Canada
- Grand'Anse Mahé, a district of Seychelles
- Grand'Anse Praslin, a district of Seychelles
- Grand Anse Beach, Saint George Parish, Grenada
- Grande-Anse, Terre-de-Bas, a district of Guadeloupe
- Grande-Anse, les Saintes, a district of Guadeloupe
