= Simonds High School =

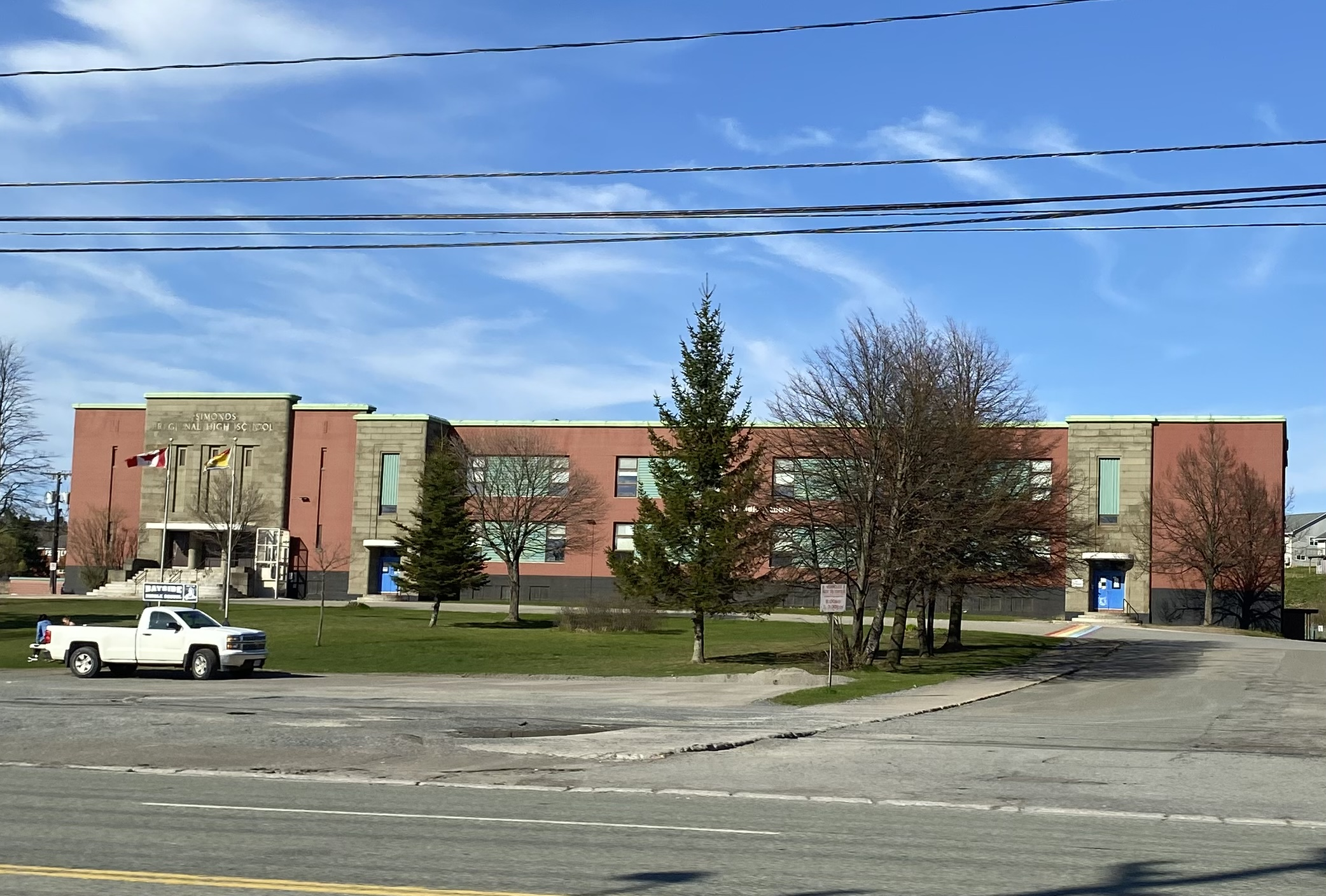

Location
- 1490 Hickey Road; Saint John, New Brunswick, E2J 4E7; Canada
- Coordinates: 45.2995°N 65.9936°W

Information
- School type: High school
- Motto: Education Today For Tomorrow; United To Learn
- Founded: 1950
- School board: Anglophone South School District
- Superintendent: Zoë Watson
- Principal: Jennifer Carhart
- Staff: c. 100
- Grades: 9-12
- Enrollment: 821 (as of 2017)
- Language: English, French
- Campus: Built 1955
- Area: Saint John, New Brunswick
- Colours: Green and Gold
- Mascot: Seabee
- Team name: The Seabees
- Website: sh.nbed.nb.ca

Simonds High School is a grade 9-12 school located in Saint John, New Brunswick. Simonds High School is in the Anglophone South School District.

== History ==
Simonds High School first opened in 1950, only four years after it was conceived, with G. Forbes Elliot serving as its first principal.

== Notable alumni ==
- Chris Skinner, former Canadian football player

== See also ==
- List of schools in New Brunswick
- Anglophone South School District
- Saint John High School
- St. Malachy's Memorial High School
- Harbour View High School
