= Grand Bay (New Brunswick) =

Body of water in southern New Brunswick, Canada

Coordinates: 45.304°N 66.160°W

The Grand Bay is a body of water at the confluence of the Wolastoq and Kennebecasis rivers in southern New Brunswick, Canada. The bay is approximately 19.7 km^{2} and spans across the boundary between Saint John and Kings counties.

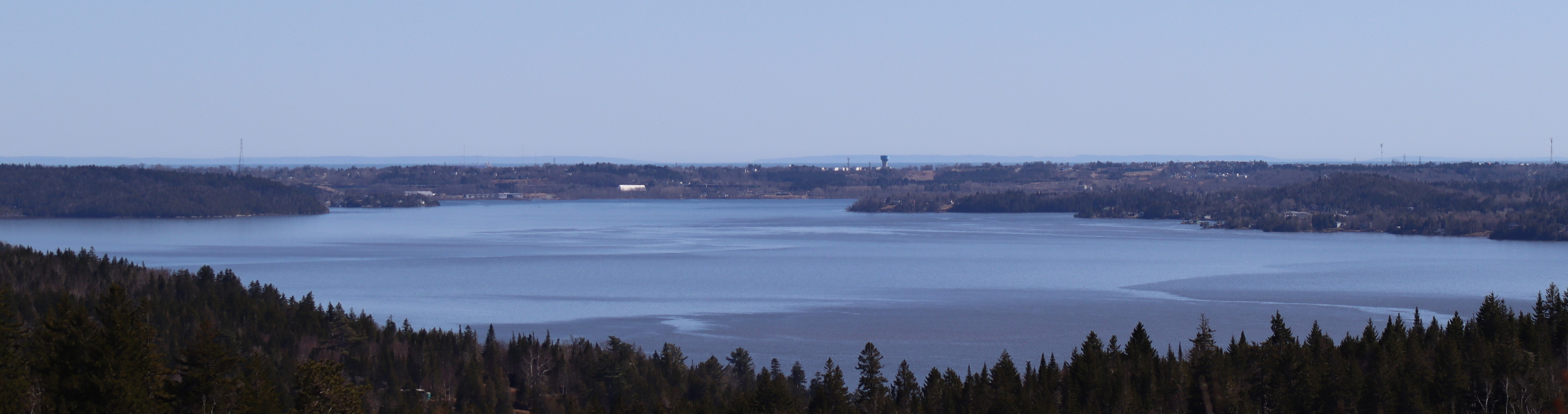
View across the Grand Bay towards Saint John at Lands End on the Kingston Peninsula

The Grand Bay's northern terminus is generally accepted to be Brandy Point on the western bank of the Wolastoq and Lands End on the Kingston Peninsula. To the south, the Grand Bay extends to Boars Head in Saint John's west side where the river splits into the South Bay and the Pokiok Narrows. From Boars Head to Lands End, the Grand Bay extents 2.4 miles northwest and averages over 0.9 mile in width. Its eastern extremity is the head of Kennebecasis Island, beyond which are the Kennebecasis Bay and Milkish Channel. At times, the water is quite rough for the passage of small craft.

== Name ==
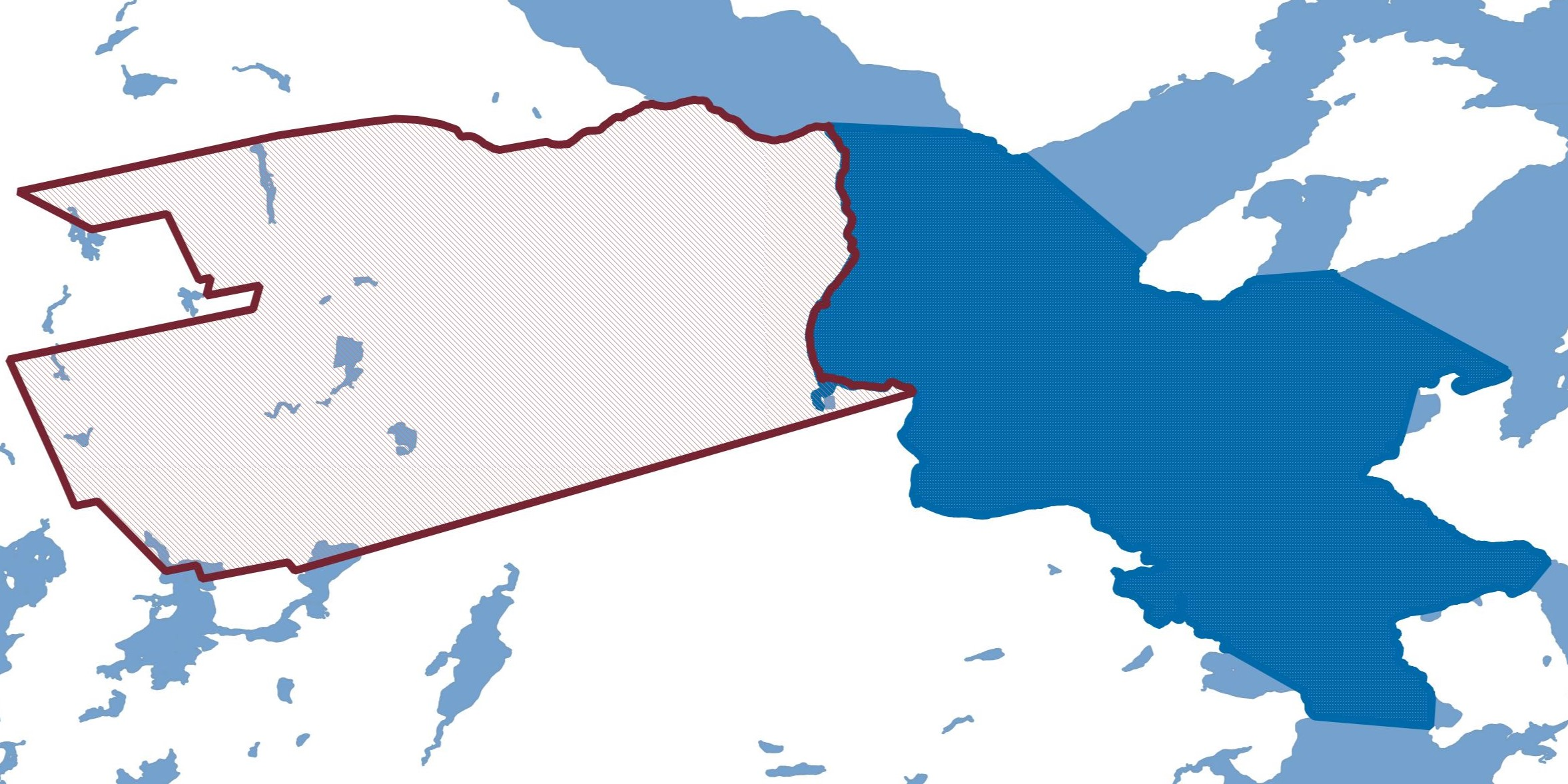
The approximate boundaries of the Grand Bay (shown in blue) and the boundaries of the Town of Grand Bay as it existed in 1988 (shown in red).

It is often claimed that the Grand Bay was named by Samuel de Champlain in 1604, but this story is likely apocryphal. Champlain does not mention this visit in his journals. While Champlain describes crossing the Revering Falls and entering a wider section of the river with three islands – likely Crow Island, Middle Island, and Goat Island – he is explicit that they did not venture any further up the river. W. F. Ganong's work on place names in New Brunswick does not list the Grand Bay as one of the names given by Champlain either, suggesting that it was given by later Acadian settlers sometime over the next one hundred and fifty years.

The Wolastoqiyik referred to the Grand Bay as Pekweetaypaykek or Pehqitkopekek. However, it is possible that this name is only a translation of the French name and not the original.

Both Pekweetaypaykek and Grand Bay have been adopted as names for settlements along the banks of the Grand Bay.

- Ketepec (Saint John County): In 1902, William F. Ganong renamed the Sutton railway stop in Lancaster Parish Ketepec: an anglicisation of Pekweetaypaykek. This name remains associated with the community around the former station.
- Grand Bay (Kings County): Another settlement across the county line in Westfield Parish was referred to as Grand Bay as early as 1869. In 1972, the Village of Pamdenec expanded to include this settlement and took on the name Grand Bay. The Village, and later Town, of Grand Bay existed until 1998. The name continues to be used as part of the amalgamated Town of Grand Bay-Westfield; though most of the community is not actually on the banks of the Grand Bay.
- Grand Bay (Saint John County): There was also a reference to another Grand Bay in the 1905 Annual Report of the Chief Commission of Public Works for New Brunswick. No precise location is given for this locale.
