= Westfield Parish, New Brunswick =

Coordinates: 45.334289°N 66.298885°W

Westfield
- Parish
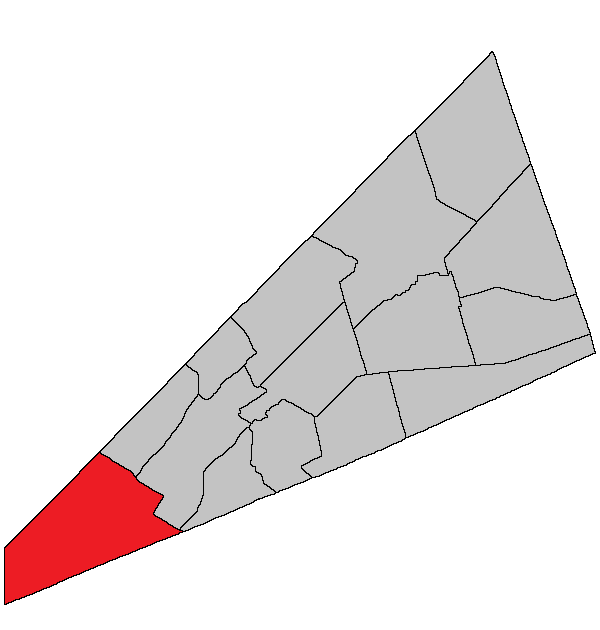
- Location within Kings County, New Brunswick.
- Country: Canada
- Province: New Brunswick
- County: Kings County
- Erected: 1786

Area
  - Land: 295.34 km^{2} (114.03 sq mi)

Population (2021)
  - Total: 2,114
  - Density: 7.2/km^{2} (19/sq mi)
  - Change 2016-2021: ▲7.7%
  - Dwellings: 970
- Time zone: UTC-4 (AST)
  - Summer (DST): UTC-3 (ADT)
- Figures do not include portion within the town of Grand Bay-Westfield

Westfield is a geographic parish in Kings County, New Brunswick, Canada.

Prior to the 2023 governance reform, for governance purposes it was divided between the town of Grand Bay-Westfield and the local service district of the parish of Westfield, both of which were members of the Fundy Regional Service Commission (FRSC). Westfield included the taxing authorities of Westfield East and Westfield West, which are sometimes erroneously described as LSDs in their own right.

== Origin of name ==
The parish may have been named for the town of Westfield in Massachusetts.

Notable is that the names of Kings County's pre-1800 parishes all occur in both New Jersey and North Carolina.

== History ==
Westfield was erected in 1786 as one of the original parishes of the county.

The 1795 reorganisation of the county affected the boundary on the Kingston Peninsula.

In 1896 the boundary on the Long Reach side of the Kingston Peninsula was altered slightly.

== Boundaries ==
Westfield Parish is bounded:

- on the northwest by the Queens County line;
- on the northeast by a line beginning on the Queens County line at a point about 300 metres northeasterly of the northern end of Mud Lake, then southeasterly along the prolongation of the line dividing two grants at the mouth of Devils Back Brook to the Saint John River, then across the river to the Kingston Peninsula, at a point about 1.2 kilometres north of Williams Lake, then southeasterly along the line between two grants to Robert and Caleb Merrit and its prolongation to the rear line of a tier of grants along the Kennebecasis River, then southwesterly along the rear line of the tier and its prolongation to a point about 375 metres east of Milkish Creek, then southeasterly along the southwestern line of a grant to Stephen Baxter and its prolongation to the Saint John County line;
- on the southeast by the Saint John county line in the Kennebecasis River;
- on the west by Charlotte County line;
- including Kennebecasis Island and nearby small islands.

== Communities ==
Communities at least partly within the parish. bold indicates an incorporated municipality

- Bayswater
- Blagdon
- Carters Point
- Cheyne Settlement
- Crystal Beach
- Days Landing
- Hardings Point
- Keatings Corner
- Lands End
- Milkish
- Morrisdale
- Public Landing
- Sand Point
- Summerville
- Sunset Valley
- Woodmans Point
- **Grand Bay-Westfield**
  - Epworth Park
  - Grand Bay
  - Hillandale
  - Ingleside
  - Ingleside Heights
  - Lingley
- **Grand Bay-Westfield**
  - Nerepis
  - Ononette
  - Pamdenec
  - Westfield
  - Westfield Beach
  - Westfield Centre

== Bodies of water ==
Bodies of water (Note: Not including brooks, ponds or coves.) at least partly within the parish.

- Kennebecasis River
  - Milkish Channel
- Nerepis River
- Saint John River
- West Branch Musquash River
- Brittains Creek
- Cunningham Creek
- Goose Creek
- Milkish Creek
- Rancliffe Creek
- more than forty officially named lakes

== Islands ==
Islands at least partly within the parish.

- Kennebecasis Island
- Ram Island

== Other notable places ==
Parks, historic sites, and other noteworthy places at least partly within the parish.

- Lepreau River Game Management Area
- Loch Alva Protected Natural Area

== Demographics ==
Parish population total does not include Grand Bay-Westfield

=== Population ===
Population trend

Census	Population	Change (%)
2016	1,962	▼6.9%
2011	2,108	▲2.7%
2006	2,053	▼3.7%
2001	2,131	▲0.0%

=== Language ===
Mother tongue (2016)

Language	Population	Pct (%)
English only	1,850	94.6%
French only	65	3.3%
Both English and French	5	0.3%
Other languages	35	1.8%

== Access Routes ==
Highways and numbered routes that run through the parish, including external routes that start or finish at the parish limits:

- **Highways**
  - Route 7
- **Principal Routes**
  - Route 102
  - Route 177
- Secondary Routes:
  - Route 790
  - Route 795
  - Route 845
- External Routes:
  - None

== See also ==
- List of parishes in New Brunswick
