= Grande-Anse, Terre-de-Bas =

Grande-Anse
- Quartier
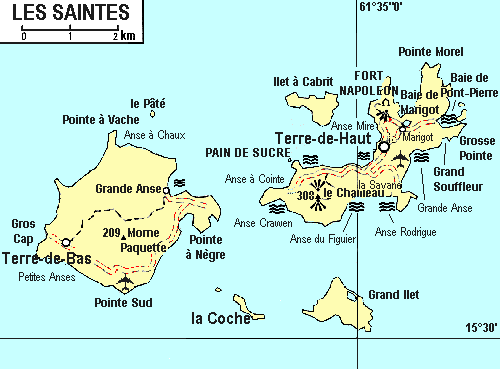
- Coordinates: 15°51′32″N 61°37′29″W
- Country: France
- Overseas department: Guadeloupe
- Canton: les Saintes
- commune: Terre-de-Bas

Grande-Anse (French pronunciation: [ɡʁɑ̃dɑ̃s]) is a quartier of Terre-de-Bas Island, located in Îles des Saintes archipelago in the Caribbean. It is located in the eastern part of the island. Some grocery, bakery and restaurant are located on this village.

== To See ==
- the beach of Grande-Anse: white sand beach with restaurants and bars.
