= Fort Boishebert =

Historic French-built fort at Woodmans Point, New Brunswick, Canada

Coordinates: 45.3700°N 66.2342°W

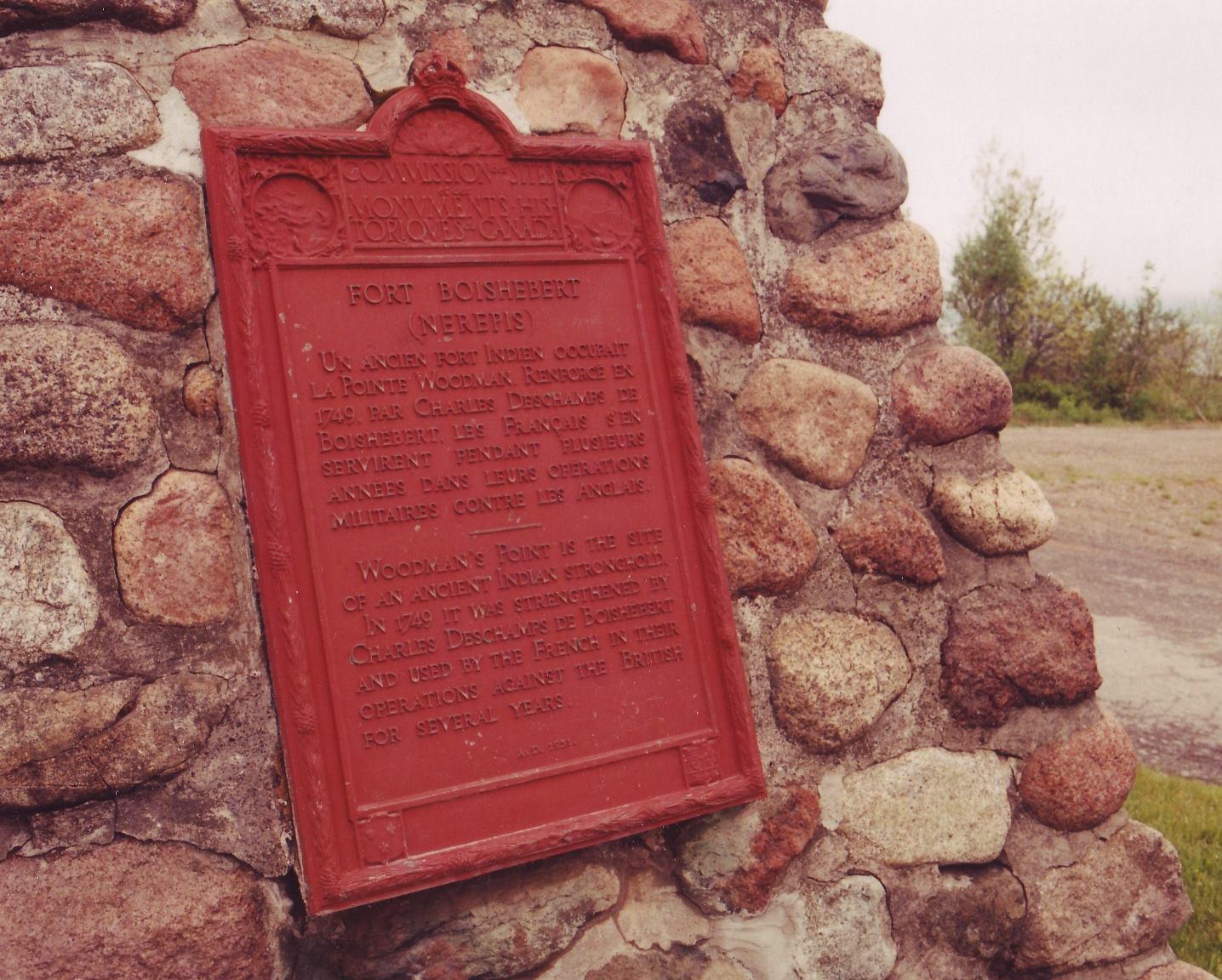
Fort Boishebert (former plaque and cairn), Woodmans Point, New Brunswick

Fort Boishébert (originally known as Fort Nerepis) is a National Historic Site at Woodmans Point outside the Town of Grand Bay–Westfield, Kings County, New Brunswick, Canada. Located at the confluence of the Saint John River and Nerepis rivers, the fort may have had its origins as a fortified aboriginal village. Joseph Robineau de Villebon noted this in a letter dated October 22, 1696, "Sr. de Neuvillette reported that he was continuing on his way down river and would, as he passed the fort of the Nerepis Indians..." Earlier in October 1696, French soldiers upon being rescued by Nerepis, retreated to Fort Nerepis after being attacked by a small English fleet that had entered Saint John Harbour.

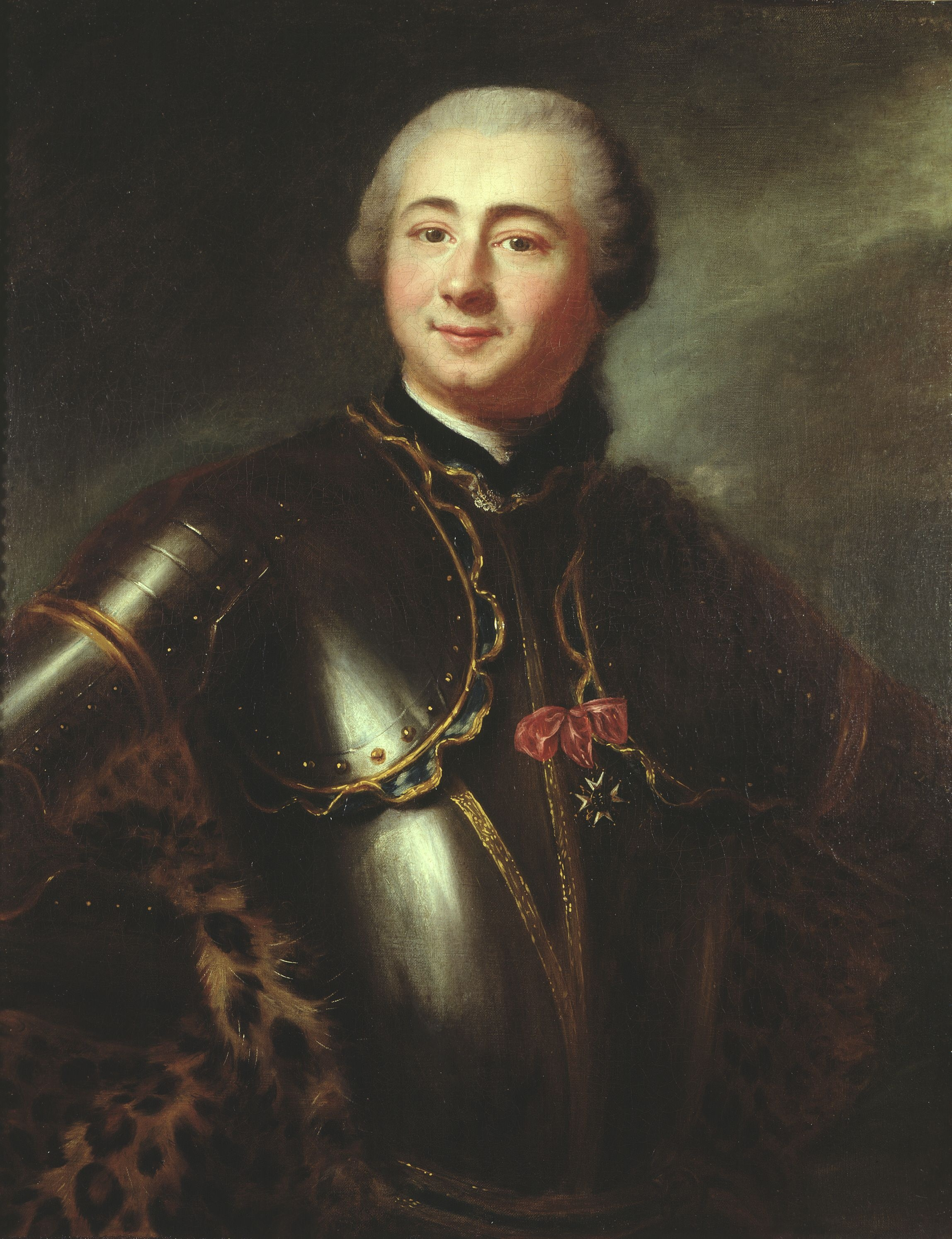
Marquis de Boishébert - Charles Deschamps de Boishébert et de Raffetot (1753)

In 1749, during Father Le Loutre's War, Charles Deschamps de Boishébert et de Raffetot rebuilt the fort after withdrawing from the mouth of the Saint John River under the terms of an agreement arranged by Captain John Rous and Edward How. The fort was subsequently abandoned in 1751 by Sr. de Gaspe when the French reestablished their control and fortified the mouth of the Saint John River with Fort Menagoueche.

The site was designated a National Historic Site in 1930.

== See also ==
- Military history of Nova Scotia
- List of French forts in North America
