= Acadiensis =

Canadian academic journal

- Discipline: Canadian studies
- Language: English, French
- Edited by: Erin Morton, Peter Twohig

Publication details
- History: 1971–present
- Publisher: University of New Brunswick (Canada)
- Frequency: Biannual (2 per year)

Standard abbreviations
- ISO 4: Acadiensis

Indexing
- ISSN: 0044-5851
- LCCN: 92641132
- JSTOR: 00445851
- OCLC no.: 316257829

Links
- Journal homepage; Online access (1971–present)

Acadiensis: Journal of the History of the Atlantic Region (fr: Acadiensis: Revue d'histoire de la région Atlantique) is a semi-annual peer-reviewed academic journal covering the history of Atlantic Canada. The current editors-in-chief are Sasha Mullally (University of New Brunswick) and Peter Twohig (Saint Mary's University). It is published by the Department of History at the University of New Brunswick, with articles in either English or French. The name Acadiensis originated with an earlier periodical with the same name, a general interest quarterly magazine for the Maritime provinces, with an emphasis on local history. It was published in Saint John, New Brunswick by David Russell Jack from 1901 to 1908 but failed due to insufficient financial support.

Acadiensis was awarded the Clio Prize of the Canadian Historical Association in 1979 for its promotion of regional history. The journal has sponsored the biennial Atlantic Canada Studies Conference since 1974 and awards an annual David Alexander Prize for the best undergraduate essay on Atlantic Canada history. A weekly blog, edited by Corey Slumkoski (Mount Saint Vincent University), publishes current commentaries. A related organization, Acadiensis Press, was established in 1980 to publish books, mainly scholarly editions of documents and thematic collections of essays.

Longterm citation data for Acadiensis reported by Scopus in 2017 rated the journal in the 68th percentile and ranked it 303 in a list of 983 history journals.

In June 2022, the journal decided to discontinue the printed edition and move to digital publication only, beginning with the 2023 issues.

== Abstracting and indexing ==
The journal offers access to its own indexes. It is also indexed and/or abstracted or aggregated in the following bibliographic databases:

- America: History and Life
- Arts and Humanities Citation Index
- Canadian Business and Current Affairs
- Canadian Index
- Canadian Periodical Index
- Current Contents/Arts and Humanities
- Educational Resources Information Center
- Érudit
- Historical Abstracts
- International Bibliography of Periodical Literature
- International Bibliography of the Social Sciences
- International Current Awareness Services
- JSTOR
- MLA International Bibliography
- Periodicals Index Online
- Project MUSE
- Scopus
