= Grand-Baie, Terre-de-Bas =

Grand-Baie
- Quartier
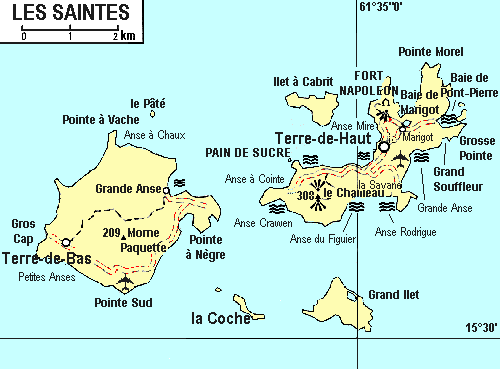
- Coordinates: 15°51′18″N 61°36′59″W
- Country: France
- Overseas department: Guadeloupe
- Canton: les Saintes
- commune: Terre-de-Bas

Grand-Baie (French pronunciation: [ɡʁɑ̃ bɛ]) is a quartier of Terre-de-Bas Island, located in Îles des Saintes archipelago in the Caribbean. It is located in the southeastern part of the island.

== To See ==
- Anchorage of Grand-Baie and ruins of the old pottery factory.
