= Nerepis, New Brunswick =

Coordinates: 45°23′49.21″N 66°18′26.26″W

Nerepis is a Canadian rural community in Westfield Parish, Kings County, New Brunswick.

It is situated on the Nerepis River and is located northwest of the town of Grand Bay-Westfield in the local service district D.O.T. Nerepis is served by Highway 177, Highway 102 and Highway 7.

Employment for Nerepis residents is often by means of a commute to Saint John, the nearest city, which is about twenty-five minutes away. Other residents commute to Fredericton, a fifty-minute drive. The community itself is rural and is surrounded by forest or wetlands, with four small subdivisions providing the residential component. Elementary and middle school students may attend schools in Grand Bay-Westfield, while high school students commute to Saint John.

Possibly a hallmark of the area, the Nerepis River provides canoeing, kayaking, fishing, and hiking opportunities. There is a Nature Conservancy of Canada preserve in the community.

== History ==
Native Americans had a community and a Fort in Nerepis there is a statue in remembrance of them its just off the Campbell road by the bridge.

== Media ==
Nerepis was featured in the game Assassin's Creed Rogue, released in 2014 by Ubisoft. The game takes place during the French and Indian War, and the Seven Years' War, and features many locations in the North Atlantic.

== See also ==
- List of communities in New Brunswick
