= Anse des Mûriers, Terre-de-Bas =

Anse des Mûriers
- Quartier
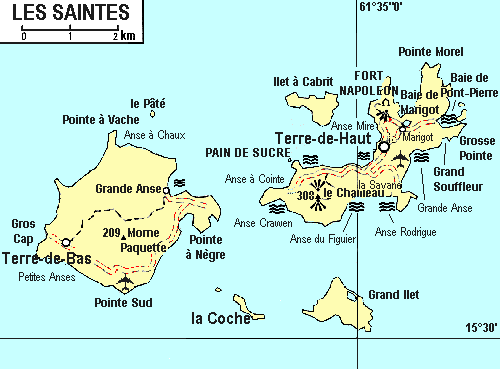
- Coordinates: 15°51′18″N 61°36′59″W
- Country: France
- Overseas department: Guadeloupe
- Canton: les Saintes
- commune: Terre-de-Bas

Anse des Mûriers (French pronunciation: [ɑ̃s de myʁje]) is a quartier of Terre-de-Bas Island, located in Îles des Saintes archipelago in the Caribbean. It is located in the eastern part of the island. The main port of the island is located at this place.

== Sights ==
- The artillery battery ruins of Fer à Cheval (literally: horseshoe) cove.
