= David Russell Jack =

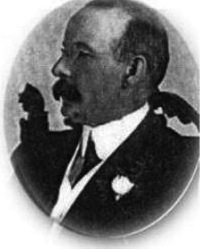
David Russell Jack

David Russell Jack (5 May 1864, Saint John, New Brunswick–2 December 1913, Clifton Springs, New York) was a Canadian author, editor, publisher, and politician.

Jack's ancestors were United Empire Loyalists who settled in New Brunswick. Jack attended the Saint John Grammar School, graduating in 1881. In 1883 he published his Centennial prize essay on the history of the city and county of St. John, which was greatly acclaimed.

In 1884, following the death of his father, Jack took over the family insurance business and also inherited his father's position as Spanish vice-consul. In the decade which followed he served his city on the Common Council as well as the Board of School Trustees. Some of his political accomplishments included the introduction of electric street lighting in Saint John, preparation for Prince George's 1901 visit, and the 1910 erection of the city's Champlain Monument.

From 1901 until 1908 Jack published Acadiensis, a quarterly journal of the history of the Maritime provinces. Jack also contributed to the Montreal Daily Star, the University Magazine (Montreal) and the Queen's Quarterly (Kingston). Jack accumulated an excellent collection of historical documents related to the Maritimes. Many of these were donated to the city library.

Jack died in 1913 at a sanatorium in New York where he was being treated for heart disease.

== Bibliography ==
- 1883, Saint John, Centennial prize essay on the history of the city and county of St. John
- 1900, Saint John, Summer tourists: a manual for the New Brunswick farmer
- 1900, Boston, Biographical review ... of leading citizens of the province of New Brunswick (contributed essay on his grandfather, David William Jack)
- 1913, Saint John, History of Saint Andrew’s Church, Saint John, N.B.
