= Chris Skinner (Canadian football) =

Canadian football player (born 1961)

No. 35, 36, 20
- Position: Running back

Personal information
- Born: December 18, 1961 (age 64); Saint John, New Brunswick, Canada
- Listed height: 5 ft 11 in (1.80 m)
- Listed weight: 212 lb (96 kg)

Career information
- College: Bishop's University

Career history
- 1984–1988: Edmonton Eskimos
- 1989: Ottawa Rough Riders
- 1990–1993: BC Lions

Awards and highlights
- Grey Cup champion (1987)

Chris Skinner (born December 18, 1961) is a Canadian former professional football running back who played ten seasons in the Canadian Football League (CFL). From Saint John, New Brunswick, he was inducted into the New Brunswick Sports Hall of Fame in 2003.

== Early career ==
Skinner first started playing football for the Simonds High School team, later playing for the University of New Brunswick until they stopped supporting the sport. He later played for Bishop's University and won All-Star and MVP honors. He also attended Bayside Middle School
