= Julie Dickson =

Canadian civil servant

Julie Dickson OC

Superintendent of Financial Institutions
- In office July 4, 2007 – June, 2014
- Preceded by: Nicholas Le Pan
- Succeeded by: Jeremy Rudin

Julie Dickson, OC was the Superintendent of the Office of the Superintendent of Financial Institutions of Canada, from July 4, 2007, to June, 2014. She later became a member of the ECB Supervisory Board, concerned with uniform regulatory oversight of euro area Banks under European Banking Supervision. The latter consists of the European Central Bank and the national supervisory authorities of participating countries.

As Superintendent, Dickson served on the Council of Governors of the Canadian Public Accountability Board, the board of directors of the Canada Deposit Insurance Corporation and the Toronto Leadership Centre board of directors. Dickson also represents the OSFI on the Financial Stability Board and was a member of the Basel Committee on Banking Supervision from 2002 to 2006.

Dickson received her master's degree in economics from Queen's University and a Bachelor of Arts (Honours Economics) from the University of New Brunswick. Dickson, a native of Saint John, New Brunswick, graduated from Saint John High School in 1975.

She was awarded the Order of Canada with the grade of officer.
