= Saint John High School =

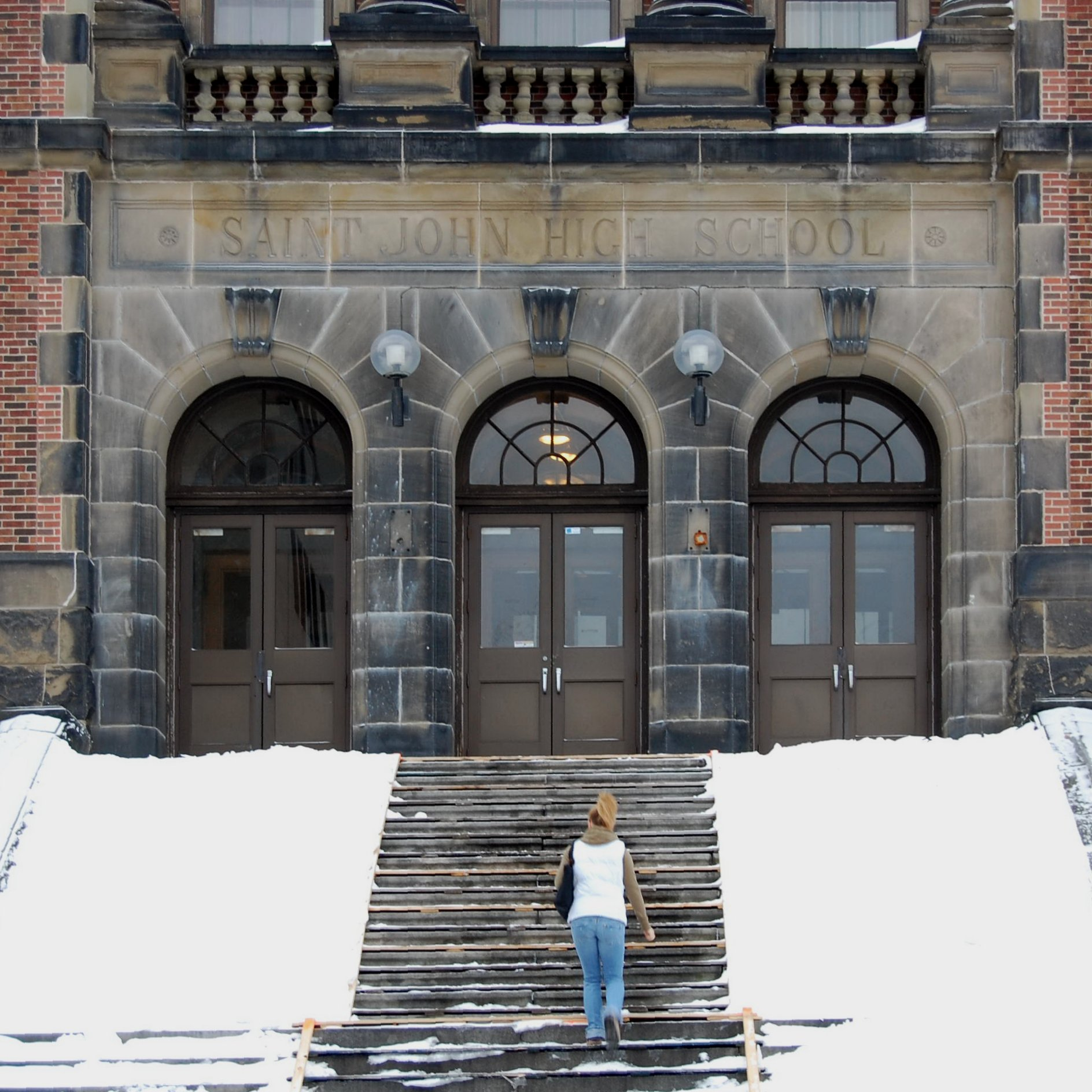

Location
- 170-200 Prince William Street; Saint John, New Brunswick, E2L 2B7; Canada; 45.2688°N 66.0609°W

Information
- School type: publicly funded high school
- Motto: Vita Vitalis (A Life Worthwhile)
- Founded: 1805; 221 years ago
- School board: Anglophone South School District (ASD-S)
- Superintendent: Zoe Watson
- School number: 2043
- Principal: Christina Barrington
- Grades: 9-12
- Enrollment: 921 (as of 2017)
- Language: English, French
- Campus: Built 1931, expanded 1964, 1986
- Area: Saint John, New Brunswick
- Colours: Red and grey
- Mascot: Greyhound
- Team name: The Greyhounds
- Website: www.sjhigh.ca

Saint John High School (SJHS) is a high school located in Saint John, New Brunswick, Canada. It was founded in 1805 and is the oldest publicly funded school in Canada.

== History ==
Saint John High School was a filming location for the 2001 crime drama film Blue Hill Avenue.

== Hounds football ==
Saint John High school's football team, coached by David Grandy, made it to the 2008 NBIAA high school football championship game after defeating Riverview Royals 21-8. It was the first time since 1901 for the Hounds. The Hounds lost the provincial game against the Bernice MacNaughton Highlanders. From 2011-2012 the team was dominated by running back Freddy "Hurricane" Hammond.

== Notable alumni ==
- David Russell Jack, 1881
- Walter Harley Trueman (1870-1951) justice, Manitoba Court of Appeal
- Eldon Rathburn (1916-2008) film composer
- Anna McNulty YouTuber & Self-Taught Contortionist
- Richard Currie (1937- ) Chancellor of the University of New Brunswick
- Anna Minerva Henderson (1887–1987), teacher, civil servant, and poet
- Steve Murphy (1960- ) broadcaster
- Brent Bambury (1960- )
- Louis Cunningham, author
- Julie Dickson
- Walter W. White
- Catherine Bruhier
- Nelson Lee
