= Harbour View High School =

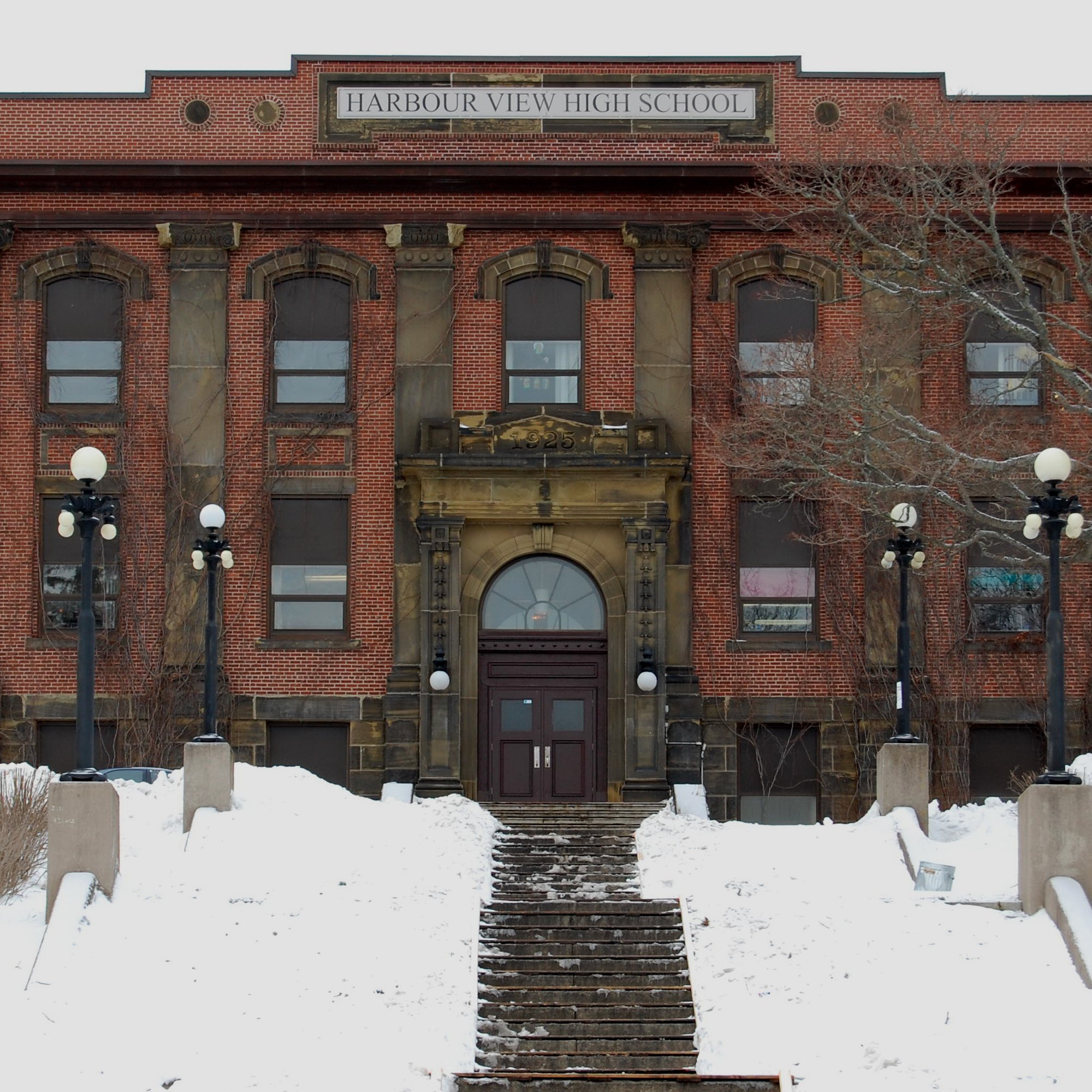

Location
- 305 Douglas Avenue; Saint John, New Brunswick, E2K 1E5; Canada; 45.26597°N 66.08432°W

Information
- School type: High school
- Motto: Invent Yourself Here
- Founded: 1997
- School district: Anglophone South
- School number: 2060
- Principal: Patrick McDade
- Staff: c. 63
- Grades: 9-12
- Enrollment: approx. 900 students (2016-2017)
- Language: English; French immersion
- Colours: Maroon and White
- Mascot: Viking
- Team name: Vikings, Lady Vikings
- Website: harbourview.nbed.ca
- Last updated: April 9, 2017

Harbour View High School (HVHS) is a high school located in Saint John, New Brunswick, Canada within the Anglophone South District. There are many students attending grades 9-12 there. The school has 68 staff members. The school's principal is Patrick McDade. HVHS was formed in 1997 with 900 students, when the former Saint John Vocational School (200 students) was transformed into HVHS to accommodate School District 8's new geographic zoning policy for its 5 high schools. The school hosts several international students.

In 2001, the school population was over 1300. HVHS, despite its location in Saint John's North End, was meant to serve the high school students for Saint John, New Brunswick's Westside, the Grand Bay–Westfield area, and the Fundy Shores area. The school, although no longer a vocational school, still carries many trade-related options. A full range of academic courses exists alongside many vocational-type courses from Metals Processing, Business, and Child Studies. Harbour View also has a selection of Fine Arts courses which, alongside Visual Arts and Music, includes Fine Arts 110, History of Rock and Roll, Instrumental Music, and Graphic Art & Design. It also offers a selection of Advanced Placement (AP) courses including AP Chemistry, AP Biology, AP Physics, AP Calculus, AP English Literature, AP English Language, AP French, AP European History, AP Psychology, AP Seminar, and AP Research. The school runs on a five-period schedule, with a 50-minute lunch break in between the third and fourth periods. Once a week, the school practices Study Hall, which extends the duration of homeroom between second and third period. Homerooms consist of students from all four grades, spanning the entirety of their high school careers.

The mural on the door panels leading into the auditorium was painted by Boschka Layton in 1940.

Harbour View's school clothing store, Valhalla, sells school merchandise such as sweatpants, sweatshirts, scarves, shirts, jackets, water bottles, and more. The school's usually monthly newspaper is called Harbour Views.

== Notable alumni ==
- Fred Ross (artist)
