= Grand Bay-Westfield =

Grand Bay–Westfield
- Town
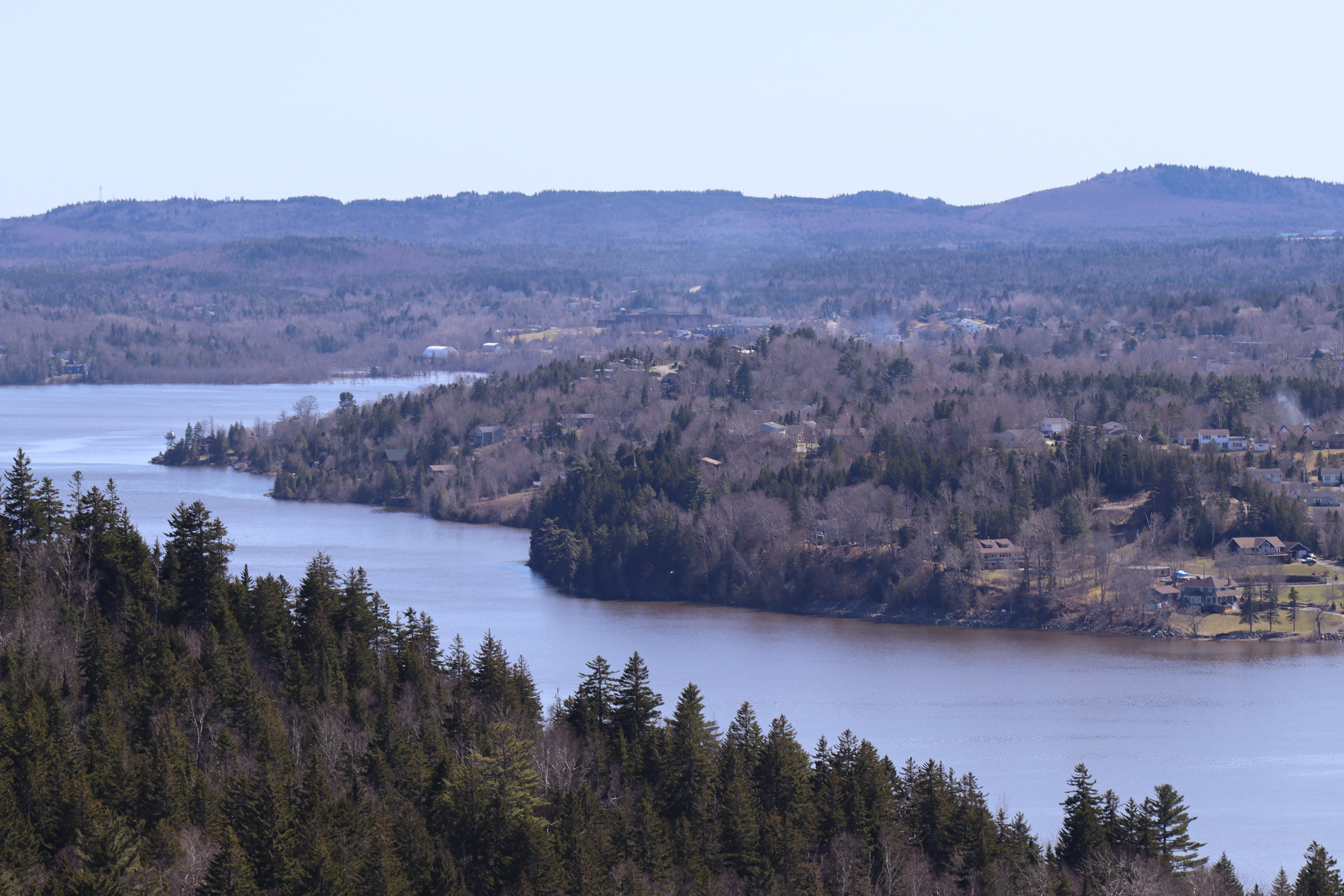
- Grand Bay-Westfield as seen from across the river at Lands End.

- Seal
- Motto: Neighbours by Nature
- Location within New Brunswick
- Coordinates: 45.36075°N 66.24151°W
- Country: Canada
- Province: New Brunswick
- County: Kings County,
- Incorporated: January 1, 1998

Government
  - Type: Town Council
  - Mayor: Brittany Merrifield

Area
  - Total: 59.82 km^{2} (23.10 sq mi)

Population (2021)
  - Total: 4,967
  - Density: 83/km^{2} (210/sq mi)
- Time zone: UTC-4 (AST)
  - Summer (DST): UTC-3 (ADT)
- Canadian postal code: E5K
- Area code: 506
- Telephone Exchange: 217, 738, 757
- NTS Map: 021G08
- GNBC Code: DBEFJ
- Website: grandbaywestfield.ca

Grand Bay-Westfield is a town in New Brunswick, Canada, on the west bank of the Saint John River immediately north of the boundary between Kings County and Saint John County.

== Name ==
The town's hyphenated name is the product of a series of amalgamations since 1966. The Parish, and later the village, of Westfield was named in honour of either Westfield, Massachusetts, or Westfield, New Jersey, by the Loyalists. The name may also simply be in reference to its location in the western corner of Kings County, New Brunswick. While the name Grand Bay (or as it appears on Monckton's 1758 map, Grand Baye) was used for the body of water by the Acadians and Loyalists, the name only became associated with the settlement at the edge of Westfield Parish around 1869.

== History ==
=== Wolastoqey Period ===
The town of Grand Bay-Westfield exists on traditional Wolastoqey land. The river that runs along the town is known as Wolastoq, along which the Wolastoqiyik, the people of the river have lived since time immemorial.

The history of Indigenous lands in New Brunswick, and so too Grand Bay-Westfield, is complicated by the fact that no land treaties were concluded between the Indigenous peoples and the Crown. As one of the Wabanaki people, the Wolastoqiyik were recognized in a series of Peace and Friendship Treaties with the British Crown which established an ongoing relationship of peace, friendship, and mutual respect between nations, but no land agreements were made whether before the province of New Brunswick was formed in 1784 or afterwards.

Though no Wolastoqey name for the area now incorporated as Grand Bay-Westfield is known, W. F. Ganong recorded the original name for the Grand Bay as Pekweetaypaykek. The Nerepis river - formerly Nelepitchk but now written as Nali'pits in Wolastoqey - which runs through the north of the town was also frequently used as part of a portage route traveling to the Musquash watershed. As Joseph Robineau de Villebon noted in a letter dated October 22, 1696, there was a fortified Wolastoqey settlement and fort at the confluence of the Nerepis and Wolastoq rivers just outside the town of Grand Bay-Westfield at Woodman's Point. This settlement was one of many stockaded outposts erected by the Wolastoqiyik; presumably for defense against the Iroquois. While the fortified settlement fell into disuse during the 18th century, many Wolastoqiyik continued to summer near the mouth of the Nerepis at Westfield Beach and Lingley into the 1920s. Westfield Beach was a particularly important summer encampment used to trap muskrat, gather fiddleheads, and collect wood and reeds for basketry and furniture making.

=== Acadian Period ===
It is a common misconception that Samuel de Champlain and Pierre Dugua, Sieur de Mons visited and named the Grand Bay. There is no mention of this event in Champlain's journals and the story is likely apocryphal. However, following Champlain's discovery of the St. John River on June 24, 1604, French settlement of the area began in earnest. In 1672, Martin D'Arprendestiguy was created Sieur de Martignon. The Martignon seigneury extended from the mouth of the Wolastoq up the west bank across the Nerepis to Long Reach. It also extended inland some distance and included the area of present day Grand Bay-Westfield.

In 1749, a small French fort was built at Woodman's Point by Charles Deschamps de Boishébert; likely on the site of the former Wolastoqiyik stronghold. The site remained a French foothold for their operations against the British until around 1755 when British forces under Colonel Robert Monckton began the expulsion of Acadian French settlers throughout the region. W. F. Ganong observed that without doubt Acadian place names were numerous in New Brunswick prior to the expulsion, but the conditions under which the English replace the French in the province were not favourable to the transfer of place names. One exception to this in the Grand Bay-Westfield area is the name Ononette, which derives from the French Pointe au Ognonette - the Acadians' name for Brandy Point. By 1758, the Acadians were almost entirely expelled from the St. John River area, and permanent British settlement began.

=== Loyalist Period ===
From 1765 to 1785 the territory north of the Bay of Fundy had been divided between only two counties, Sunbury, which included the settlements on the Wolastoq and the Passamaquoddy Bay, and Cumberland, which included the settlements at the head of the Bay of Fundy. When Loyalist transport ships arrived at Saint John in 1783, the area now referred to as Grand Bay-Westfield was part of Sunbury County, most of it within the Township of Conway. It was not until June 18, 1784, that Britain included Sunbury County and northern Cumberland County in the colony of New Brunswick. Separation from Nova Scotia only became complete in November with the public reading on the commission of newly arrived Governor Thomas Carleton. The Loyalists established the Parish of Westfield within Kings County in 1786.

Among the Loyalists who settled in present-day Grand Bay-Westfield were a small group of 31 Black Loyalists. The British promised land grants and provisions for three years to Loyalists who immigrated to Saint John, but most of the free Black Loyalists arriving in the area did not see this promise fulfilled. Most settled into what is now the north end of Saint John and many were forced into slavery, which was still prevalent in New Brunswick, or became indentured servants. Others found menial jobs in order to survive. In 1787, 31 petitioners received a total of 1550 acres in Grand Bay-Westfield and created a small community. The group was led by Richard Corankapone Wheeler. Notably, the areas granted were nearly unfarmable.

The Black Loyalist community struggled to survive and many returned to Saint John. By 1790, many of the freed slaves had become disillusioned with life in Westfield and abandoned the land or sold out to other settlers. Some of the land was reverted back to the government and was re-granted. One community member, Thomas Peters, went to England to persuade the British to provide free transport to Sierra Leone and land grants there for anyone interested. Richard Corankapone Wheeler was so desperate to leave Westfield that he and several companions spent fifteen days walking from Westfield to Halifax in December 1791 to catch one of the ships going to Sierra Leone. On January 15, 1792, he and approximately 1200 others left Halifax.

Other early black residents of the area came as slaves. Major John Coffin's wife, for instance, had two slaves while Coffin had four.

In the early Loyalist period, lumbering was the most important industry of the Grand Bay-Westfield area. Records indicate that the first road through Grand Bay was built in 1788. By 1840, three stagecoaches traveled through the area en route from Saint John to Fredericton. The first railway to operate through Grand Bay, the New Brunswick Railway, began operation in 1869. The improvement of transportation routes enabled new businesses to develop and expand. James Ready first brewed his product on one of the second tiers of land grants back from the Wolastoq. His beer was transported to Saint John by wagon and train.

== Municipal Chronology and Boundary Changes ==
=== County government ===
In 1851, the Provincial Legislature passed the Municipal Act to provide for the establishment of municipal governments in the counties. Municipal incorporation transferred to elected municipal or county councils most of the legislative and executive authority formerly vested in the Quarter Sessions – the form of local administration which had previously dominated Loyalist New Brunswick. The law was permissive and did not compel incorporation. Upon the petition of at least fifty taxpayers in a county, the sheriff would convene public meetings of households and ratepayers in the county's parishes. If two thirds of those present and voting at such meetings favoured incorporation, an application would then be entertained by the Provincial government. While many counties including Carleton, York, and Sunbury took advantage of the opportunity, Kings County was not incorporated until a general act requiring all counties to incorporate received majority assent in the legislature in 1877.

The Act of 1877 remained the basis for rural local government in New Brunswick until 1966. The basic unit for county electoral purposes was the parish with two councillors generally elected for each parish. County elections were held at various times of the year and councillors retained office for varying periods of time. The area now encompassed by the town of Grand Bay-Westfield was at this point part of the larger Westfield Parish.

=== Local Improvement Districts ===
As urban and suburban populations began to expand on the outskirts of more established urban centres, many areas began demanding more specialized and localized service provision than could be delivered by county governments. The 1945 Local Improvement Districts Act facilitated incorporation for limited municipal purposes in many centres, including the communities of Westfield and Pamdenec. Pamdenec was established as a Local Improvement District on January 6, 1948. The boundaries of the District were later altered in 1952, and additional services were added in 1965. Westfield was established as a Local Improvement District on 23 October 1952. The services offered by the Westfield Local Improvement District were altered twice in 1957 and 1959.

=== Equal Opportunity Program ===
The first incorporated villages in the area now incorporated as Grand Bay-Westfield were created during the Equal Opportunity Program after the abolition of county government. The villages of Pamdenec and Westfield incorporated in 1966. In 1972, the village of Westfield absorbed the neighbourhoods of Lingley, Sagwa, and Nerepis. Pamdenec absorbed the neighbourhoods of Grand Bay, Epworth Park, and Ingleside to become the village of Grand Bay in 1973. In 1988, Grand Bay became a town.

=== Cormier Report and Municipal Consolidation ===
Following the December 1992 release of a government discussion paper entitled "Strengthening Municipal Government in New Brunswick's Urban Centres", a series of localized feasibility studies were commissioned by the Frank McKenna Liberals targeting six geographic areas: Edmundston, Campbellton, Dalhousie, Miramichi, Moncton, and Saint John. In each instance, a panel composed of local representatives and expert consulting staff made specific recommendations for each urban-centred region. The report for the Greater Saint John area, "A Community of Communities: Creating a stronger future" - often referred to simply as the Cormier Report - offered two potential solutions to the Province for consolidating the many municipalities in Greater Saint John, neither of which was ultimately adopted by government.

Option one offered by the Cormier Report was to create three communities with regionalization of some services. Under this option, the six Kennebecasis Valley communities (East Riverside-Kinghurst, Fairvale, Gondola Point, Quispamsis, Renforth, and Rothesay) plus the local service district of the Parish of Rothesay would be consolidated into one new municipality. The town of Grand Bay and various unincorporated areas around Saint John would also be consolidated into the city of Saint John to form the second new municipality. The third municipality in this scenario would be Westfield, which would remain separate because it was more rural and less populated. However, Cormier recommended that the rest of the Parish of Westfield join the village to form a new, larger Rural Community. In this scenario, many services including water and sewerage, planning, and economic development would be regionalized across the three municipalities.

The second option offered by Cormier was a full consolidation of eight of the existing communities into one new city. In this scenario, only Westfield would remain a separate municipality. Full consolidation was unpopular among residents outside the city of Saint John. Suburban residents stated generally that they were pleased with their communities as they were and that they liked their lower tax rates. As Cormier summarized it, residents "perceive Saint John as an expensive, poorly managed bureaucracy that does not serve its citizens well. They fear loss of control, loss of services, and loss of neighbourhood friendliness and sense of community." Suburban residents' comments at public meetings support this description. One resident stated that he resented the questionnaire Commissioner Cormier had circulated to residents that asked them to rank their order of preference for his five reorganization schemes because it meant that the worst that full amalgamation could do is fifth place. As the resident put it, "full amalgamation into one city would come about three million, nine hundred and fifty-sixth on anybody's choice. That would come just above amalgamation with Red China."

Ultimately, neither of the two options was implemented. Rather, the provincial government chose to proceed with partial consolidations and opted to legislate cost sharing for five specific regional facilities. The town of Grand Bay and village of Westfield were amalgamated on January 1, 1998. Despite Cormier's insistence that Westfield be expanded in either consolidation scenario to "serve as a buffer zone where development is planned and well regulated" to "ensure they would prevent migration and urban sprawl.", no additional portions of the Parish of Westfield not already part of the village of Westfield or town of Grand Bay were annexed. At the time, residents were not given a choice on the name of their new community. Instead, the Province decided to repurpose the name of the Provincial electoral district established in 1994: Grand Bay-Westfield.

=== The Higgs-Allain Local Governance Reforms ===
The town of Grand Bay-Westfield underwent another amalgamation as part of the Higgs-Allain Local Governance Reforms. In November 2021, the Province announced it would engage in strategic local restructuring to reduce the total number of local governments from 104 to just 78. As part of this strategic restructuring, the town of Grand Bay-Westfield and part of the neighbouring local service district of Westfield (Note: Often called Westfield West, to distinguish it from the portion on the Kingston Peninsula and Kennebecasis Island; the LSD legally included both.) would amalgamate into a new municipality temporarily referred to as Entity 51. Like all New Brunswick municipalities impacted by Local Governance Reform, the new municipality was informed that the Transition Committee needed to find a permanent name to replace Entity 51 before May 16, 2022.

Map of the wards that will be used for the November 28, 2022, by-election in Grand Bay-Westfield.

At a Special Council Meeting on February 17, 2022, Town Council and the Local Service District Transition Committee Representatives approved the naming process for Entity 51. Residents of Grand Bay-Westfield and a portion of the LSD of Westfield were invited to participate in the local decision-making process of naming Entity 51 by becoming a volunteer member on the Naming Committee. Following the Council meeting of February 28, 2022, the nine-member Naming Committee was appointed on March 1. Committee membership included residents and elected representatives from both town and local service district.

Using a naming process designed by Grand Bay-Westfield Town Council and staff, residents of the new Entity 51 were invited by the Naming Committee to participate in a two phase naming process. The first phase of the naming process was a public contest. Residents were asked to submit potential names for the new town along with a short written explanation of their choice. Notably, it was predetermined by the Town Council that the name “Grand Bay-Westfield” would automatically be included on the final voting ballot. The contest ran from March 11 to 28. From 369 total submissions, 116 were unique names.

Once all submissions were received, the town created a decision-making tool based on Canada's Guiding Principles for Geographic Naming. The tool – a name matrix – was designed with and approved by both the town's Transition Facilitator and the Province's appointed toponymy expert. The naming committee used the matrix to narrow the list from 116 to a top 15.

Those top 15 names were then reviewed by the Province. Some names were eliminated for being too long, too general, or for not meeting the Province's standard of full and proper consultation. Next, the committee voted on the ten remaining names using ranked ballots to arrive at our final five choices. On April 6, the Naming Committee held its final regular meeting. After a detailed review of the process from town staff, the committee resolved a tie between two names by eliminating one of two finalists with very similar names. Ultimately, the 5 names selected to appear on the ballot were Hillandale, Nerepis Valley, Three Rivers, Westfield, and Grand Bay-Westfield.

The voting period ran from April 13 to May 2. Residents and businesses within the boundaries of Entity 51 received a flyer in the mail with complete details including voting access keys for vote. The ballot used preferential voting and was operated through the ElectionBuddy voting platform. At the final meeting of the Naming Committee on May 4, 2022, the winning named was revealed to be Grand Bay-Westfield. There were 2,165 votes cast, with Grand Bay-Westfield receiving at least 51% of the vote. Pending approval by the province, Grand Bay-Westfield will come into effect as the name for the governing body of Entity 51 on Jan. 1, 2023.

Prior to the official creation of the new local government of Grand Bay-Westfield, there will be a by-election in the portion of the local service district of Westfield. While Grand Bay-Westfield's councillors are usually elected at-large, for the purposes of providing representation to the annexed portion of Westfield the town will be divided into two wards until the next quadrennial municipal election. Ward 1 will include the current town of Grand Bay-Westfield and Ward 2 will be the portion of the local service district (LSD) of Westfield.

Beyond the addition of a portion of the adjacent LSD, there will be other minor changes to the boundaries of Grand Bay-Westfield. These changes include some alterations along the county line, the Loch Alva Wilderness Area, and at Robin Hood Lake.

== Demographics ==
In the 2021 Census of Population conducted by Statistics Canada, Grand Bay-Westfield had a population of 4,967 living in 1,965 of its 2,031 total private dwellings, a change of 0.1% from its 2016 population of 4,964. With a land area of 59.82 km^{2} (23.10 sq mi), it had a population density of 83.0/km^{2} (215.1/sq mi) in 2021.

== Transportation ==
=== Rail ===
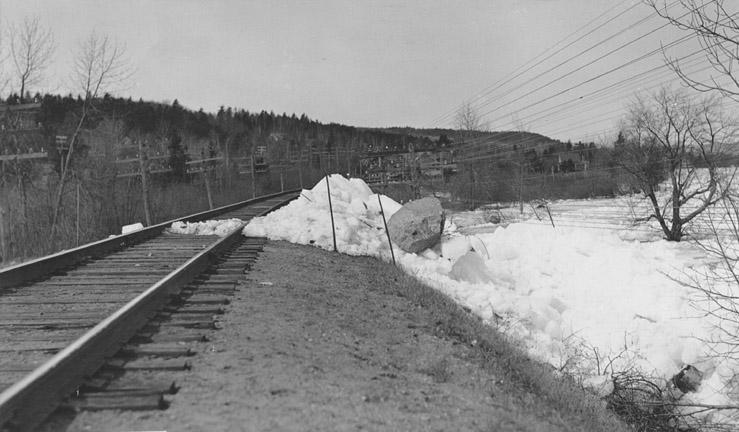
Ice break-up on tracks at Westfield, 1936

In 1869 the European and North American Railway Western Extension was opened through the area between Saint John and Vanceboro, Maine. The rail line changed ownership to the New Brunswick Railway before becoming part of the Canadian Pacific Railway mainline from Saint John to Montreal in the 1880s. CPR established several stations through the area (Grand Bay, Pamdenec, Epworth Park, Ingleside, Ononette, Hillandale, Westfield Beach, Lingley, Sagwa, and Nerepis). The rail line was sold in 1995 and is now operated as the New Brunswick Southern Railway.

=== Roads ===
Route 177 is the town's main road, called River Valley Drive in the Grand Bay section of town and Nerepis Road in the Westfield part. Other main streets are Woolastook Drive, which winds through the highlands of Grand Bay, and Inglewood Drive is host to the Pamdenec, Epworth Park, Brandy Point & Ingleside subdivisions on Grand Bay's shore front. Also, NB Route 102 which begins north of Fredericton ends in Westfield. Highway 7, the main route from Saint John to Fredericton, passes through the western extremity of the town. In September, 2008, part of the ground that supports the railway tracks was washed away after Hurricane Hanna.

=== Marine ===
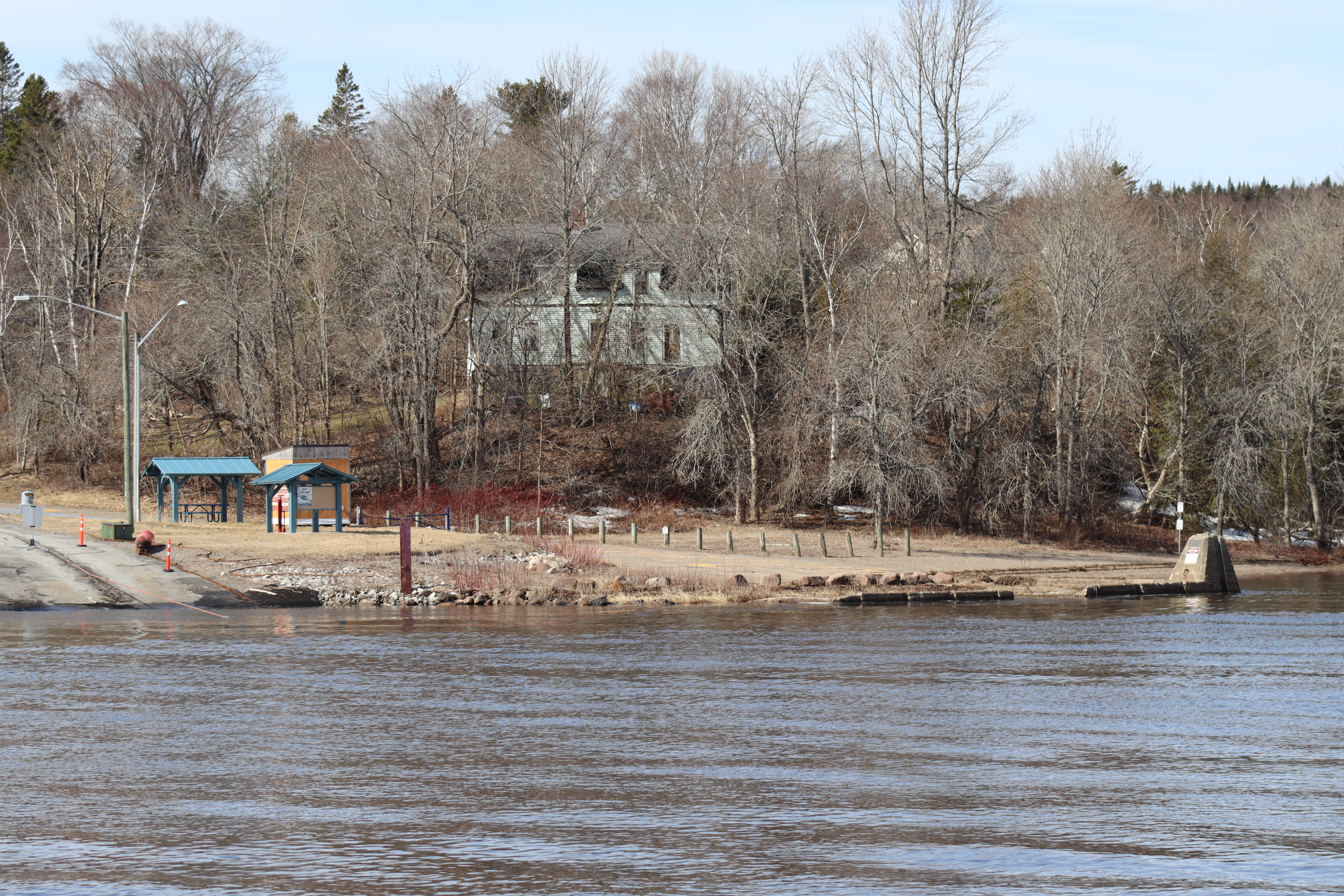
Westfield Wharf River Landing, a former steamboat wharf beside the ferry crossing.

From 1816 to 1946, steamship transport was the primary means of both passenger and cargo transportation between Saint John and Fredericton. Along the river, various stopping places were established. The area encompassed by the present town of Grand Bay-Westfield included two such stops, the Westfield Wharf and the Epworth Park Wharf. The former was owned by the Provincial and later Federal governments for public use and eventually came to be repurposed as a ferry landing and boat launch after the steamboat traffic stopped. The latter was privately owned, and ceased to be maintained in the 1930s.

The town has a ferry landing at the end of Ferry Road in Westfield. The Westfield Ferry, a cable ferry route operated by the provincial Department of Transportation using a pair of ferries, connects Westfield with the community of Hardings Point on the Kingston Peninsula. There is a popular campground just a few feet from the Hardings Point ferry landing.

The Canadian Coast Guard maintains a seasonal (summer only) search and rescue station at Brundage Point near the Westfield ferry landing. Inshore Rescue Boat Station Saint John (IRB Station Saint John) operates a Zodiac Hurricane 733 fast rescue craft in the lower Saint John River, covering all areas downstream from Evandale to the Reversing Falls, including the Kennebecasis River and Belleisle Bay. IRB Station Saint John is tasked by Joint Rescue Coordination Centre Halifax.

== Neighbourhoods ==
=== Grand Bay ===
- Grand Bay – These three neighbourhoods (areas around Murray St, Thompson Rd & Bayview Rd) constitute the original village of Grand Bay. It is the downtown core of the town. Most businesses are located here and the area borders the city of Saint John.
- Highlands/Round Lake – heavily wooded and very steep, wind through the backlands and end at Round Lake.
- Pamdenec – The town hall and fire department are located here at 609-615 River Valley Drive.
- Epworth Park – Loyalist Captain John Hayter was granted 400 acres on land on the St. John River and settled at what is now Epworth Park. His brother William later built the first frame house near Epworth Park, to which his brother John Hayter and his family moved when they left the log house which they had erected in 1783. About 1907, two Saint John Methodist Ministers, Rev. James Crisp and Rev. Neil MacLaughlan hoped to establish a campground in the area similar to the Beulah Camp at Browns Flat. Charles Hayter, a descendant of John Hayter, sold the pair a parcel of land near the river for $1500 which they named Epworth Park after the hometown of John Wesley, the founder of the Methodist Church. Cottages began to be built, mainly for Methodist familiar from Saint John. Eventually the Church campground idea was abandoned and families of various denominations started building summer cottages.
- Brandy Point Estates – A suburban-type neighbourhood built in the 1970s and 1980s. Historically part of Epworth Park, it is now much larger in population than Epworth.
- Ingleside – The last community before Milligan Brook before you enter Westfield.
- Panoramic Estates – This is a new neighbourhood being built just north of the Centrum.
- Epworth Park Heights – This neighbourhood is west of Epworth Park and is much higher. Epworth Park Heights is very distinct from Epworth Park proper.
- Beverly Hills & Valley View Estates – This growing neighbourhood is located off Woolastook Drive. The streets of the area are characterized by extremely steep hills and dense woods.
- Brookdale Heights – A hilly neighbourhood on the edge of Milligan Brook. Brookside Park is a small garden area located near the entrance to the neighbourhood.

=== Westfield ===
- Ononette – In 1902, the name Ononette was given to the Canadian Pacific Railway station serving the area from Milligan Brook to the Inglewood Road. The name Ononette was given to the community by William Francis Ganong. Prior to 1902, the station had been named Riverbank. The name is derived from Pointe au Ognonette, the Acadians' name for Brandy Point. Although Brandy Point had once been its own flag station on the Canadian Pacific Railway, by 1898 the flag station and surrounding neighbourhood had been renamed Ingleside. Since he liked the name and it was no longer in use elsewhere, Ganong reappropriated the name Ononette for the next station up the river.
- Hillandale – Formerly called Ballentine or Woolastook, Hillandale was the name given to the Canadian Pacific Railway station serving the area from Inglewood Road to the ferry landing at Brundage Point. Hillandale remains the name of a prominent road stretching all the way to the backlands, but the name also saw a brief resurgence in popularity as a finalist on the ballot for the new town name during the Higgs-Allain Local Governance Reforms.
- Westfield Beach – In the 1800s this sandy stretch along the banks of the Wolastoq was a summer community for residents of Saint John. The Westfield Beach station became a hub for two railways, where one from Maine and the other from Fredericton joined here en route to Saint John. Accordingly, the Westfield Beach station was larger than others in the area, housing a telegraph office and manicured park.
- Lingley – Lingley was named for Peter and Mary Lingley, Loyalists from New York State who established a large farm there. This community, extending from the mouth of the Nerepis River to the lower end of Chestnut Drive, sustained more damage than any other during the Great Fire of 1921.
- Sagwa – The entire community was part of the 6000-acre grant known as Glazier's Manor, which was acquired by General John Coffin in 1783.
- Nerepis – The railway station at Nerepis was only a shelter and quite small. It was built on the downriver side of the beginning of the Brittain Road. Boxcars were often left here on a siding near the station. This community around the former Nerepis Station, commonly called Nerepis, is not to be confused with the separate community of Nerepis, which lies on the other side of the Nerepis River across the Brittain Road Bridge. Nerepis is part of Grand Bay-Westfield.

== Municipal Symbols ==
=== Grand Bay (1973) ===
The village of Grand Bay's 1973 crest featured four elements: a sailboat, a tree on a small hill, and the letters "G" and "B". The sailboat would be reused in future iconography (and remains the principal symbol for the town today). The tree on the hill was presumably a reference to the former village of Pamdenec, as the name Pamdenec means "little hill".

=== Grand Bay (1988) ===
Upon incorporation as a town in 1988, the Grand Bay adopted a new logo. The new crest featured an enlarged image of the same sailboat depicted on the original 1973 crest and featured the tagline "A Community of Friends".

=== Westfield (1989) ===
Westfield was the first New Brunswick municipality to be granted armorial bearings from the Sovereign through Her Majesty's Canadian Officers of Arms. Early in 1988, it was suggested to the Village Council that a symbol be developed for use by the village. Westfield's official request for a coat of arms was made to the Chief Herald of Canada by Mayor Kevin Thorne on behalf of the Council on October 25, 1988. Following the development of design proposals by a committee of councillors, the Westfield Council agreed on a proposed design and motto to be submitted on December 13, 1988. Westfield received its Coat of Arms on June 30, 1989.

In Westfield's shield of arms the basic tinctures, white and green, and the green cross-crosslets are taken from the arms of John Coffin.

The next device on the shield is the so-called Tudor Rose with a yellow disc in the centre bearing the numeral 4. This is the same badge used on the tunic buttons of the Kings American Regiment. In recognition of its service the regiment was placed on the British Army's regular establishment in 1782 and designated the 4th American Regiment, hence the numeral in the centre of the rose. This device was chosen because Ensign Henry Nase, the first Loyalist settler of Westfield, served in the unit for six years until it was disbanded in New Brunswick in 1783. Nase became a colonel in the New Brunswick militia, a respected magistrate, and a prominent churchman.

Across the upper third of the shield there is a broad band known in heraldic terms as a chief. In the Westfield arms this is coloured black with five heraldic representations of ermine tails to represent fur as a nod to the early French regime in the area. Sieur of Martignon Martin D'Arprendestiguy - whose seigneury included the lands which would become Westfield - made his living from the fur trade.

The crest consists of a wreath of twisted cloth in the main colours of the shield, white and green, on which there sits a Loyalist coronet. It consists of a gold rim inscribed with the motto "UNITAS IMPERII" or "Unity of Empire". The rim is topped with red Canadian maple and green English oak leaves. From the coronet there rises an Eastern Panther. The panther supports a staff which bears the Union Flag of 1707 under which the Loyalists fought in the American Revolution.

The motto associated with the coat of arms is "INTER AGROS ET FLUMINA HABITENS", or "Dwelling between fields and rivers" in reference to the local geography.

=== Grand Bay-Westfield (1998) ===
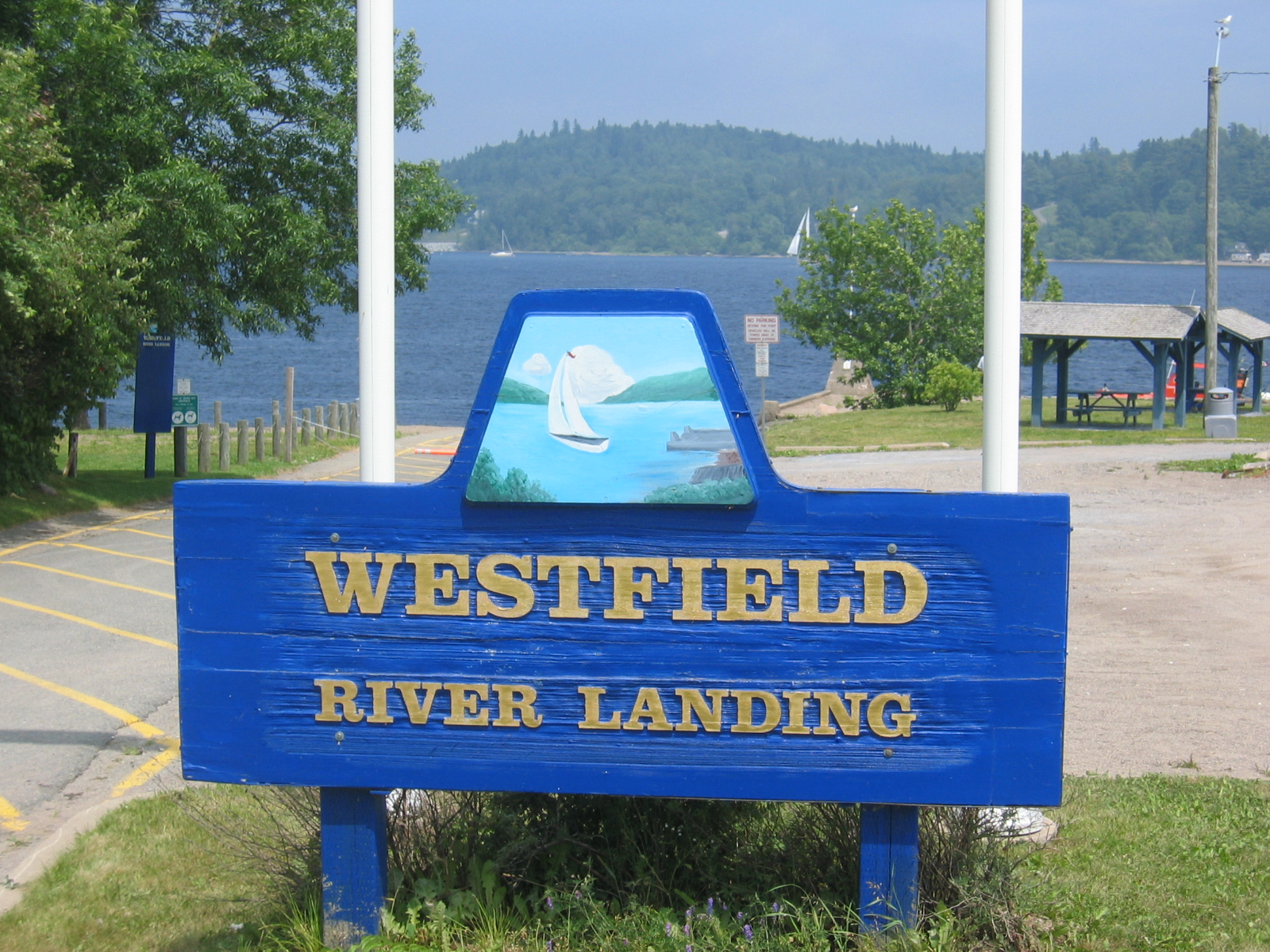
Sign for Westfield River Landing

When the town of Grand Bay and village of Westfield amalgamated in 1998, the new town crest incorporated elements of both the Grand Bay logo and the painting featured on signs at the Westfield River Landing. While the logo reused the Grand Bay motto, "A Community of Friends", and generally resembled the town's 1988 logo, the 1998 iteration added additional detail to the sailboat depicted and incorporated the Westfield Wharf and boat launch as a means of making Westfield residents feel included.

=== Grand Bay-Westfield (2021) ===
In March 2021, the town's new corporate branding and website were launched. The new logo maintained the sailboat associated with both Grand Bay and Westfield since the 1970s, but abstracted the icon into three simple shapes coloured yellow, green, and blue. The new corporate branding also resulted in a new town motto: Neighbours by Nature. New welcome signs with the updated branding were installed on the town's southern border in May 2021 in advance of the new Council's term, but the gradual rollout of the branding was put on hold until the impact of the Higgs-Allain local governance reforms on town boundaries and identity was known.

== Parks ==
Grand Bay-Westfield has many parks, from simple greenspace to ballfields and playgrounds. They are listed below, in geographical order from south to north.

- Henderson Brook Nature Park: A tiny, new park, Henderson Brook is a great place to watch beavers and birds. It is located on Shannon Road.
- Southwood Park: playground at corner of Bayview Road and Cavalier Lane.
- Inglewood School: playground and baseball diamond.
- Grand Bay Primary School: playground and fieldspace.
- Grand Bay Tennis Courts: 3 regulation-sized tennis courts, located at the corner of Inglewood Drive and Pamdenec Road.
- Pamdenec Place: The former location of the Tennis Courts, now a simple park setting accessible from Pamdenec Road and Frederick Street.
- Lions Field: On Inglewood Drive near Broad Street, two ballfields and a playground.
- Epworth Park Field: green space at corner of Central Avenue and Smith Lane.
- River Valley Middle School: Baseball field, soccer field, football field and, as of summer 2008, a running and walking track
- Brookside Park: A small sitting area near the corner of Brookdale Avenue and Woolastook Drive.
- Unity Park: Could be considered the town's commons, this park was created to symbolize the joining of the two communities. It is located next to Milligan Brook where the former boundary was (corner of Nerepis Road and Mullen Lane). The small stage is used in the summer for events every Wednesday, including children's nights, folk music, local talent, etc.
- Westfield School: A large playground.
- Brundage Point
- Westfield River Landing: Located at Ferry Road and Brundage Point Road.

== Notable people ==
- John Coffin - Judge and army officer
- Anna McNulty - YouTuber
- Brenda Murphy - 32nd Lieutenant Governor of New Brunswick

== See also ==
- The Grand Bay (Body of Water)
- Amalgamations of New Brunswick
- Fundy-River Valley (provincial electoral district)
- New Brunswick School District 08
- New Brunswick Southwest (federal electoral district)
- List of communities in New Brunswick
