= James Ready (beer) =

James Ready Brewing Co. Saint John, New Brunswick.

James Ready Brewing Co. is a Canadian beer brand brewed at Moosehead Breweries in Toronto, Montréal, and Saint John. The brand has five lagers, each with varying alcohol by volume. These five lagers (from lightest to darkest) are:

1. James Ready Lager
2. James Ready Light
3. James Ready Original Ale
4. James Ready 5.5
5. James Ready 6.0

== History ==
Ready Brewery was founded by James Ready in Saint John, a man from Ireland. Moosehead was founded by the Oland family in Nova Scotia. Moosehead Brewery's original founders, Susannah and John Oland, first named the brewery The Army and Navy Brewery, as most of their customers were soldiers. After two fires and the Halifax Harbour Explosion, the Oland sons relocated Moosehead from Halifax to Saint John, buying the already established Ready Brewery and branding it as Moosehead Brewery by 1931. Now Canada's oldest brewery, Moosehead Brewery is operated by descendants of the Oland family.

== Marketing and expansion ==
The James Ready brand uses a variety of advertising techniques. In 2011, they utilized the letters on the underside of the bottle caps to hold a "spelling bee competition." Twice a week, the brand posted videos on its Facebook page where a word was spelled out using the undersides of the bottle caps. The first participant to spell out the same word using bottle caps and post it on the page would win a small trinket as a prize. Also using their Facebook page, James Ready created a campaign called the "Drinkers of Awesomeness Bottles." Drinkers posted their pictures on the brand's page to prove themselves as James Ready's most loyal drinker. Based on voting by Facebook followers, the top 100 entrants in the contest had their pictures turned into labels on James Ready beer bottles. These simple, Facebook-based techniques solidified James Ready's target market as college students, as those were the people who dominated the brand's Facebook page.

Collaborating with Leo Burnett advertising agency, James Ready prepared for expansion in 2012 and 2013. The brand's Facebook advertising was due to a small budget however with increased competition in the beer industry, James Ready aims to expand its market and its advertising techniques. Leo Burnett and James Ready's consumer interaction-focused advertising has highlighted their entertainment factor in the past, and now with plans to expand, the two are prepared to increase profits and gain more interest in the brand. James Ready plans to move across Western Canada and into the beer tap industry, opening its target market to older audiences, as opposed to being focused on Southern Ontario college students.
