= Terre-de-Bas Island =

Terre-de-Bas
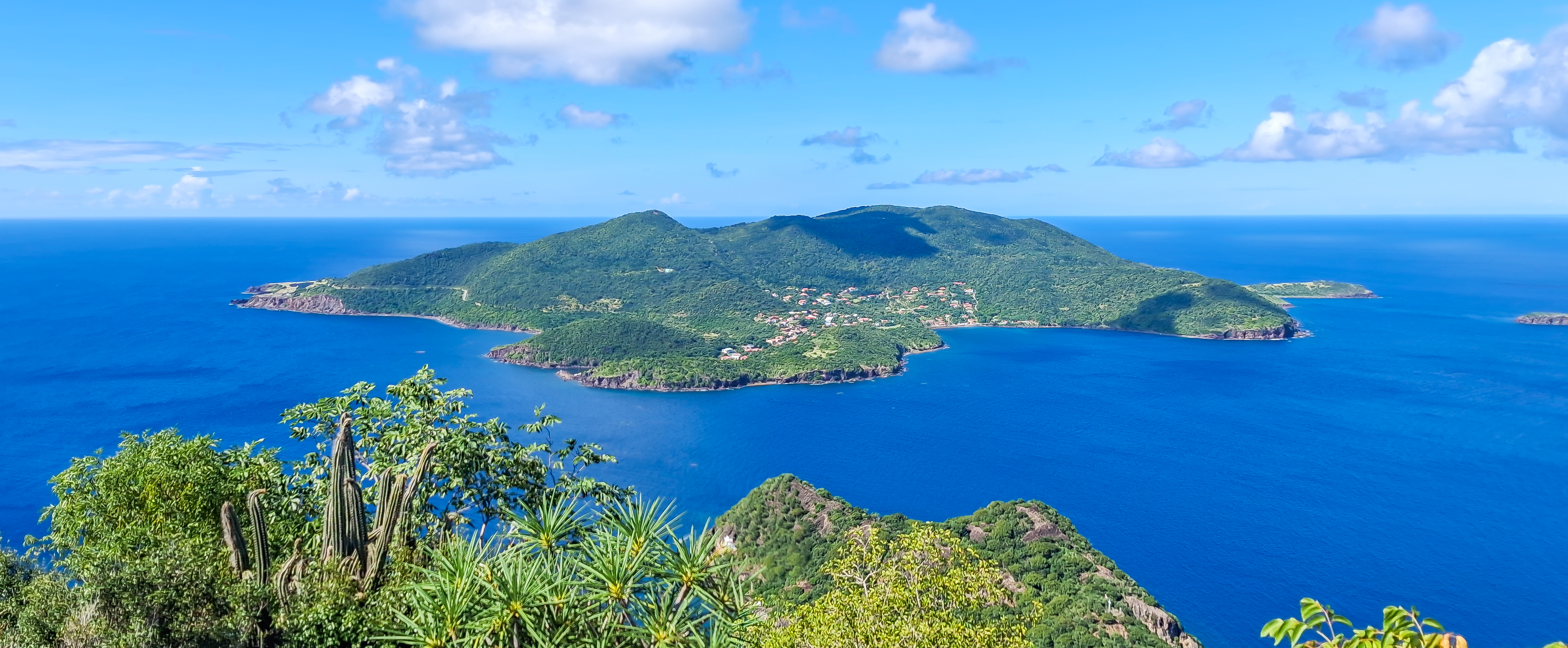
- Terre-de-Bas view from Chameau hill on Terre-de-Haut.

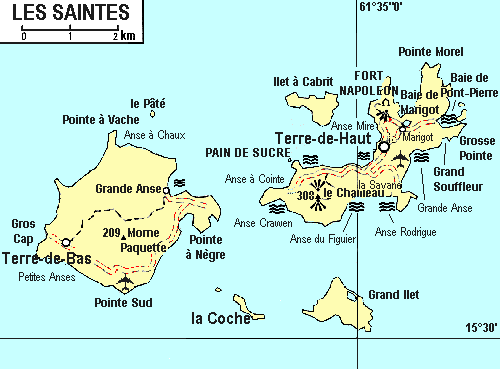
- Terre-de-Bas Island on the left

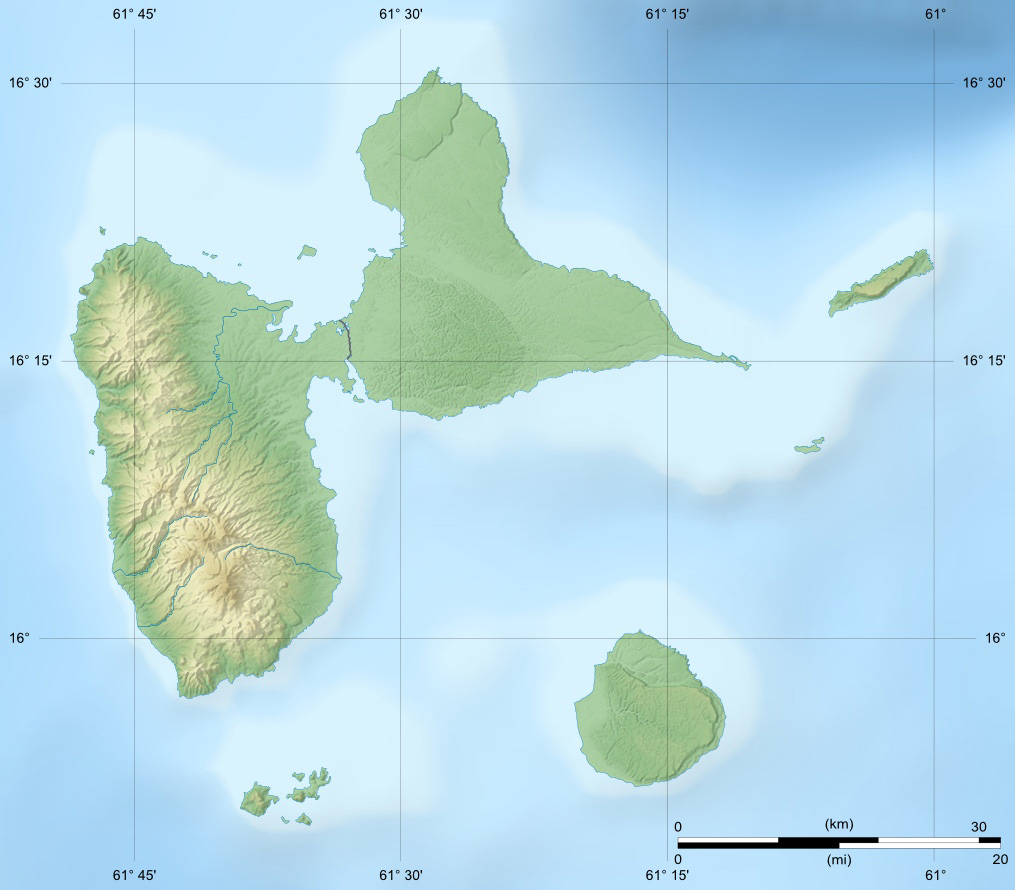
- Location within Guadeloupe Location within Lesser Antilles Location within the Caribbean

Geography
- Location: Caribbean Sea
- Coordinates: 15°51′15″N 61°37′58″W
- Archipelago: Îles des Saintes
- Area: 9 km^{2} (3.5 sq mi)
- Highest elevation: 293 m (961 ft)
- Highest point: Abymes hill

Administration
- France
- Overseas department: Guadeloupe
- Canton: Trois-Rivières
- commune: Terre-de-Bas
- Capital city: Petite-Anse
- Largest settlement: Petite-Anse
- Mayor: Fred Beaujour

Demographics
- Population: 1046 (2017)
- Pop. density: 154/km^{2} (399/sq mi)

Terre-de-Bas Island (French pronunciation: [tɛʁ də ba]; officially in French: Terre-de-Bas des Saintes (literally: Lowland of les Saintes)) is an island in the Îles des Saintes archipelago, in the Lesser Antilles.

It belongs to the commune (municipality) of Terre-de-Bas in the French department of Guadeloupe.

== Geography ==
=== Description ===
Terre-de-Bas island is the most occidental island of the archipelago of les Saintes. Like its neighbour Terre-de-Haut, it derives its name from maritime speak which called the islands exposed to the wind hightland and those protected from the wind, lowlands. It is an island of 9 km^{2} (3.5 sq mi) dominated by a mountain massif sheltering a protected forest in its center (Morne à Coq hill, Morne Paquette hill, Morne Madis hill, Morne Abymes hill) and a coast lined with cliffs and points (in French: Pointe) (Pointe à Nègre point, Gros cap cliff, Pointe à Vache point, Pointe Noire point, Pointe Sud point). The highest point of the island is Abymes hill with a height of (293 metres (961 ft)) . Terre-de-Bas is separate from Terre-de-Haut by a narrow channel of 890 m (0.55 mi). Besides Terre-de-Haut, several small islands surround Terre-de-Bas :

- Îlet à Cabrit
- la Redonde
- Grand-Îlet
- la Coche
- les Augustins
- le Pâté

=== Populated areas ===
Few villages are seen spread out in the rolling hills in the interior. Petite-Anse, the most important village of the island is located in a Valley encircled of mountain without views on the sea. Petite-Anse is the village where is the administrative buildings of the municipality (City hall, Post office, schools), on the opposite site of the principal harbour. The oldest settlement still remaining are the villages of Grande-Anse and Petite-Anse.The population is spread among 5 quartiers (district), more or less well delimited. They are grouped into two halves:

eastside		Westside	
Nr	Quartier	Nr	Quartier
1; 2; 3	Anse des Mûriers; Grande-Anse; Grand-Baie	4; 5	Petite-Anse le Mapou

== Demography ==
Contrary to Terre-de-Haut, Terre-de-Bas island has a population composed of mixed peoples because of its historical short time of agricultural crop. The (Saintois) [sɛtwa] (French gentilic of the inhabitants of les Saintes) from Terre-de-Bas were 1,046 inhabitants in 2017, with a density of population of 154 inhabitants / km2. The number of households was 429 in 2017.

The life expectancy is 75 years for men and 82 years for women. The average number of children per woman is 2.32.

== Economy ==
The island lives essentially on fishing and craft industry. Contrary to Terre-de-Haut, Terre-de-Bas is unfrequented, however, tourism activities try to make a shy development since these three last years. A small West Indian bay tree (Pimenta racemosa) farm is more active and produce Bay rum" (a rub lotion which curatives qualities whose the efficiency was widely proved in the Antilles), for the regional markel.

== Sights ==
- Artillery battery ruins of Fer à Cheval (literally:horseshoe).
- Walk into forest and pond
- Mountain of Morne Paquette and Morne Abymes
- Natural reserves protected by Conservatoire du littoral (Pointe Sud, Gros Cap, Pointe de Miquelon)
- Saint-Nicholas' church
- Anchorage and ruins of the old pottery factory
- Diving sites (Sec pâté, Les Augustins)
- The beaches (Grande-Anse, Anse à Dos)
- The Salako manufacturer
