= Anna McNulty =

Canadian YouTuber, cheerleader and contortionist

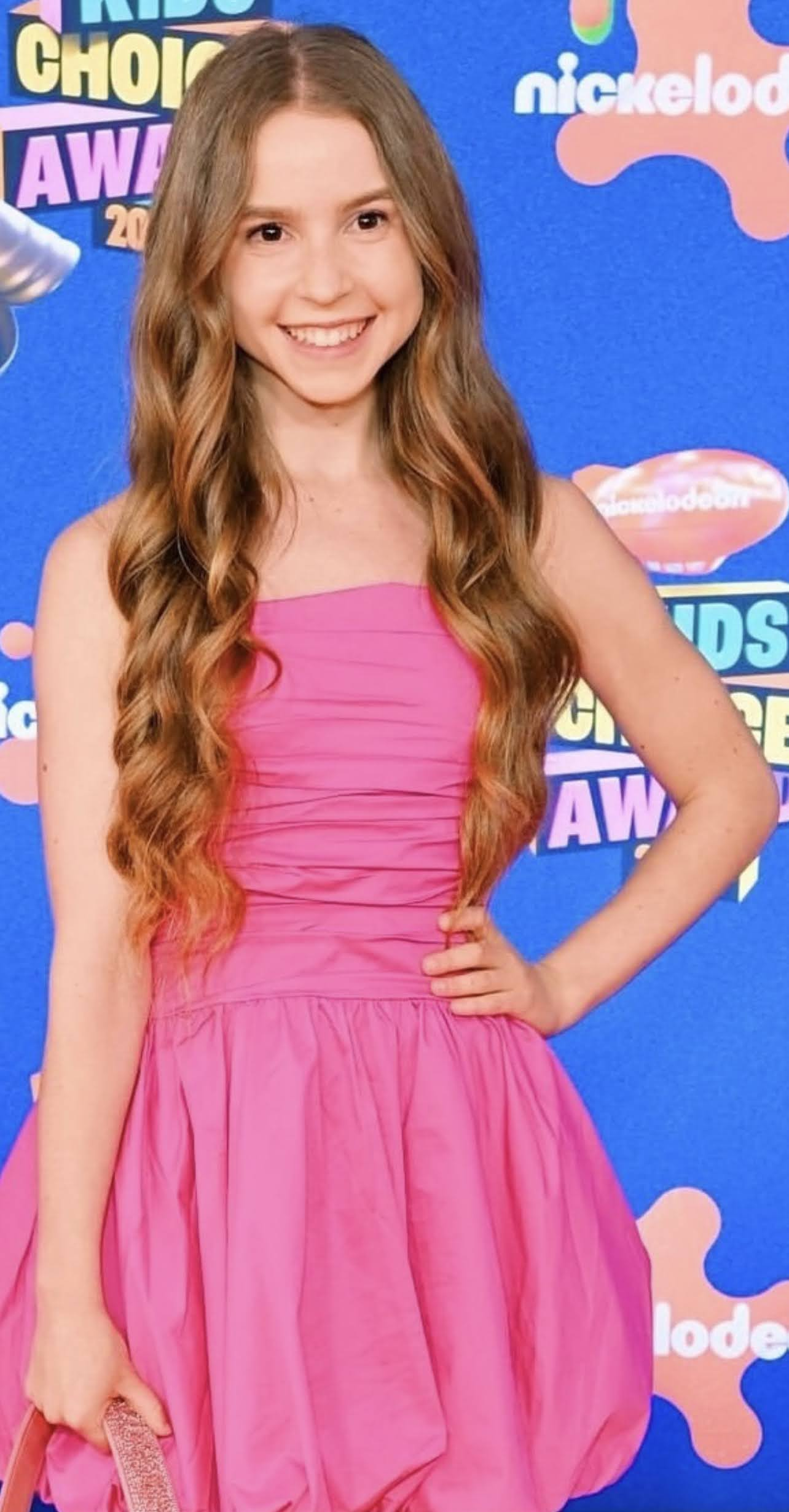
- McNulty attending the 2024 Kids Choice Awards in Santa Monica, CA
- Born: Anna Elizabeth McNulty; April 26, 2002 (age 24); Grand Bay-Westfield, New Brunswick, Canada
- Occupations: Contortionist; YouTuber

YouTube information
- Channel: Anna McNulty
- Years active: 2014–present
- Subscribers: 16 million
- Views: 4.4 billion
- Last updated: November 22, 2026
- Website: annamcnulty.com

Anna Elizabeth McNulty (born April 26, 2002) is a Canadian YouTuber and self-taught contortionist. In 2023, she was named YouTube's top Canadian creator of the year and was named the Number 1 Gymnastics Channel on YouTube in late 2026 by Guinness World Records. As of November 2026, her YouTube channel has 16 million subscribers and 4.4 billion views. She has an estimated petite adult height of 4’ 11”.

== Early life and education ==
McNulty is from Grand Bay-Westfield, New Brunswick. She has been cheerleading since she was 10 years old. In 2016, McNulty won an Instagram model search for Limelight Dancewear. She graduated high school in 2020.

== YouTube ==
McNulty is a self-taught contortionist. She began making YouTube videos in 2016 when she was 14 after gaining a small following on Instagram. At the time, Instagram only allowed 15-second videos and McNulty needed more time to share flexibility tips. Her YouTube content focuses on flexibility and stretching. In 2023, she was YouTube's top Canadian creator of the year, with almost eight million subscribers. She was named the Number 1 Gymnastics Channel on YouTube by Guinness World Records in late 2026.

McNulty is also active on Instagram and TikTok. As of September 2025, McNulty has 8.7 million TikTok subscribers and 1.1 million Instagram followers.

== Filmography ==
In 2025, McNulty made a guest appearance on The Thundermans: Undercover, playing Lexi.
