= Nerepis River =

25-mile river in New Brunswick, Canada

Coordinates: 45°22′N 66°15′W

The Nerepis River is a river approximately 25 miles (40 km) long in New Brunswick, Canada. "Na,li'pits" is Wolastoqiyik for "valley between hills" a name believed to be at least 11,000 years old by the local natives and evidenced by a fluted point discovered by archaeologists. [7] First recorded in the early 1600s by French explorer Samuel de Champlain. A popular river for canoeists and anglers, it is a tributary of the Saint John River. The river has been subjected to significant environmental stress over many years.

The river meets the Saint John River at Westfield, part of the Town of Grand Bay-Westfield, where it feeds a fresh water marsh. Towards the headwaters, it passes through the communities of Nerepis, Blagdon, Bayard, Welsford (where a tributary, Douglas Creek, tumbles into the river over a 15-metre (49 ft) waterfall), Fowlers Corners, Petersville, and New Jerusalem. The river also passes the 13th hole of the Welsford Golf Course. Most of the land it passes through is undeveloped although there has been extensive clear cutting in the upper reaches. The Nerepis River Watershed also drains part of CFB Gagetown.

== Settlement ==
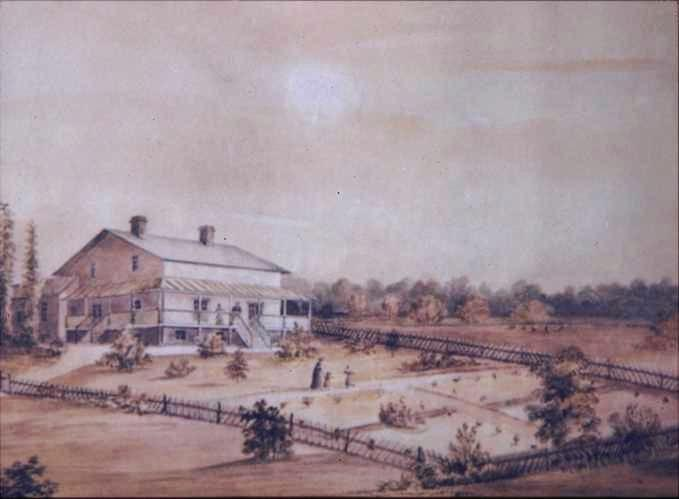
This house was owned by General John Coffin. Coffin was granted a tract on the Nerepis as a reward for services rendered the British during the American Revolution. The painting dates from 1839. New Brunswick Museum

There was an Indian settlement and fort at the confluence of the Nerepis and the St John Rivers (Woodman's Point), known to the French as early as 1696. The French, under the command of Boishébert, rebuilt the fort in 1749 and renamed it Fort Boishebert. The fort was used as a base to lead a harassment campaign against the English. The fort was abandoned after Fort LaTour was rebuilt at the mouth of the St John.

The land came to be settled by Loyalists following the American Revolution. Lands were granted to those who had pleased the British. Among the recipients was Maj. John Coffin, a half-pay officer of the New York Volunteers and later a member of the Assembly in New Brunswick.

== Transportation ==
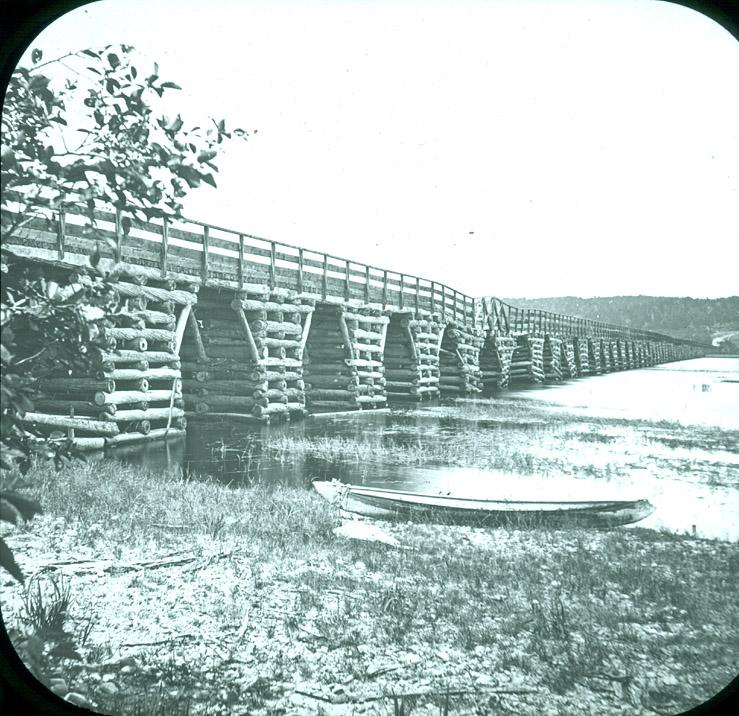
Bridge across Nerepis River at Westfield, 1875

Early in the European period of New Brunswick settlement, Route 7 ran along the west side of the river providing the main link between the capital city of Fredericton and the port city of Saint John. Part of the route was superseded in 1965 and is now designated Route 177 (Nerepis Road). There are more than half a dozen bridges or culverts over the river. A long crib bridge structure in the nineteenth century was short-lived. It served the modern Route 102.

== Water quality concerns ==
Over many years, military practice manoeuvres at CFB Gagetown have degraded the water quality and affected fish habitat in the river and its tributaries. Since 1996, the base has been actively working to remedy the situation by hardening fords and stream approach routes. Perhaps more insidiously, the river was also exposed to dioxins from the use of Agent Orange and Agent Purple during secret tests in 1966 and 1967. Herbicides have also been sprayed on the base since 1952. However, a 2006 report found that “exposures to dioxin in soil, sediment and surface water in the Nerepis River area do not represent a potential concern for illness for the angler.”

The Nerepis Marsh, a fresh-water body of approximately one square mile (2.6 km^{2}) in size, lies near the confluence of the Nerepis and the Saint John rivers.

== See also ==
- List of bodies of water of New Brunswick
