= Salako =

Hat worn in French Antilles

Salako is a hat from Îles des Saintes (French Antilles). It appeared towards the end of the 19th century. It is made on Terre-de-Bas Island by some last craftsmen who still have the art and the technics of its making.

== Description ==
Salako is the traditional headgear of people from les Saintes archipelago. Even if its usage is strongly rarefied, it is still worn by some fishermen for whom it is a perfect working accessory, protecting against the sun and the rain thanks to its wide edges indeformable by the wind. The particular silhouette of this headgear is noticeable by far offshore and helps to identify a Saintoise (traditional boat) from les Saintes islands. The elders of the archipelago also wear it during walks in streets at the sunny hours.

The men having looked for bamboos and wood from pond, cut it and sharpen it to making this headgear with their dexterity and their know-how.

The main structure is formed by fine slats sharped called " pikèt ", joined around a round central piece of wood in cone point, called " the heart ". These slats are tightened and tied up between them by circles of bamboo, called " sèrk ", then rounded off to be fixed in the extremities between two flat strips of bamboo making the circumference, called " sèrk bordaj ".

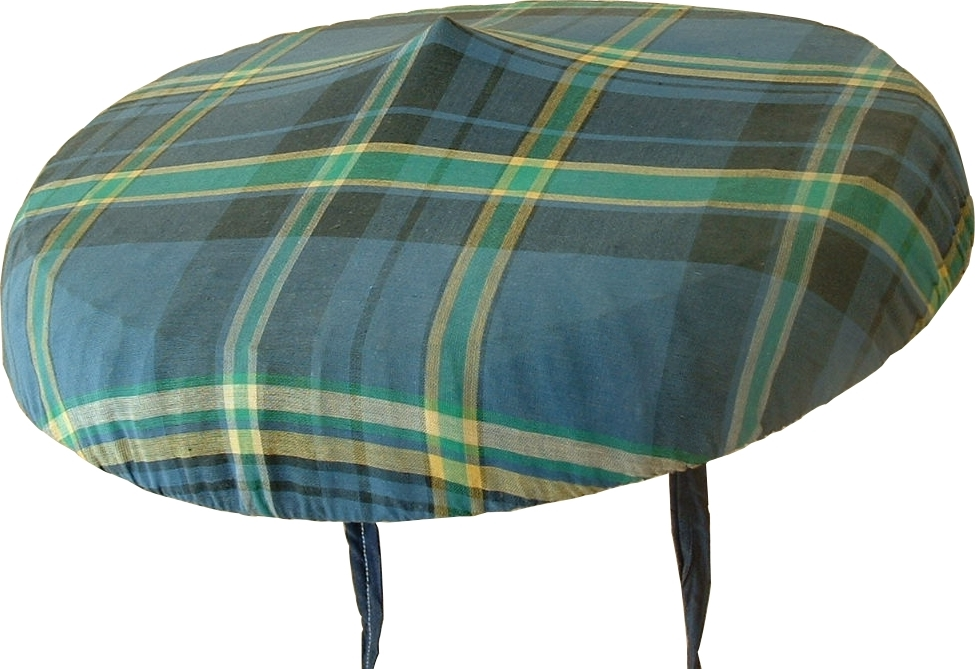
Salako (Les Saintes's traditional hat)

Only a good sun exposure allows the hat to obtain a good roundness. A delicate meshing of fibers of bamboo, in the method of the weaving of the founds of chairs or rocking chairs, called le won, comes on the main structure and forms the head size.

At the conclusion of this craft work, the needlewomen come on stage and create the dressing of the salako. Traditionally dressed in white fabric for the side exposed to the sun, to limit the heat of the sun and the sky blue for the shaded side (colors of the holy Virgin Mary). It is since the development of the tourism dressed in madras fabric for the business.

The salako does not miss to redo its appearance in the traditional costume of les Saintes islands during the festivities and the representations of the local folklore.

== Origin ==
The salako is almost identical in shape and construction to the traditional Filipino headgear known as the salakot (which is also the origin of the pith helmet). Cloth-covered versions of this headgear were widely adopted by Spanish troops in the early 18th century as lightweight protection against the sun and rain. This was later copied by French colonial troops in Indochina in the mid-19th century who called it the salacco. The salacco likely arrived at Les Saintes towards the end of the 19th century, on the head of a French naval officer coming back from South-East Asia.

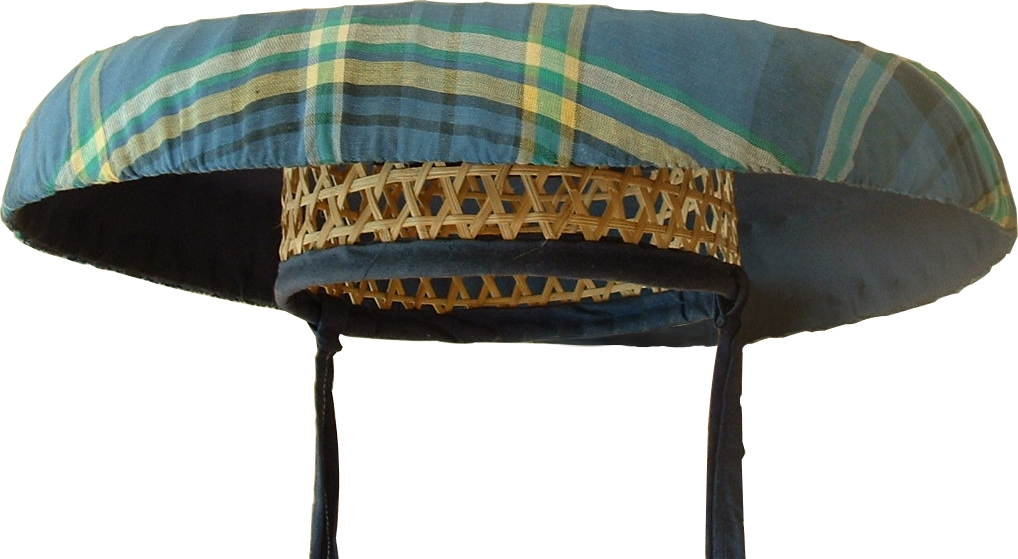
Salako (Les Saintes's traditional hat)

== Symbolism ==
Salako is an appropriate element of the representation of les Saintes's identity. The bank of French overseas departments made the numismatic effigy of the one thousand French franc bill (exchange value of ten new French francs) of French departments of America (Guadeloupe, Martinique, French Guiana), from 1962 till 1972.

It also appears on the coat of arms of the tourism office of Terre-de-Haut island.

== See also ==
- List of hat styles
- Pith helmet
- Asian conical hat
