= Pamdenec, New Brunswick =

Former village in New Brunswick, Canada

Pamdenec
- Former village
- Typical Pamdenec Cottage

- Location within New Brunswick
- Coordinates: 45.313°N 66.194°W
- Country: Canada
- Province: New Brunswick
- County: Kings County
- Incorporated: 1966
- Time zone: UTC-4 (AST)
  - Summer (DST): UTC-3 (ADT)
- Canadian postal code: E5K
- Area code: 506
- Telephone Exchange: 217, 738, 757
- NTS Map: 021G08
- GNBC Code: DBEFJ

Pamdenec was a small bedroom community located on the Saint John River, 1.85 kilometres (1.15 mi) north of Grand Bay, in Westfield Parish, Kings County, New Brunswick, Canada. Pamdenec had a post office from 1924 to 1968, was incorporated as a village in 1966, and became part of the village of Grand Bay in 1972.

"Pamdenec" is a Maliseet name, meaning "little hill". The community was formerly called Hillside and in 1866, under that name, was a farming community consisting of approximately 75 families.

In 2011, the area was listed on the Canadian Register of Historic Places for its cultural value as the site of a group of summer cottages owned by members of the Jewish community of Saint John, mainly from the 1920s to the 1960s.
