= Terre-de-Bas =

- Commune
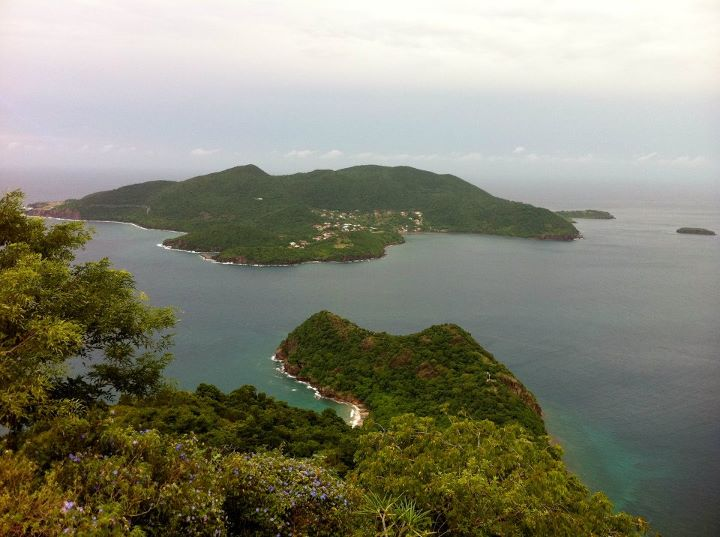
- A view of Terre-de-Bas from Chameau Hill on Terre-de-Haut

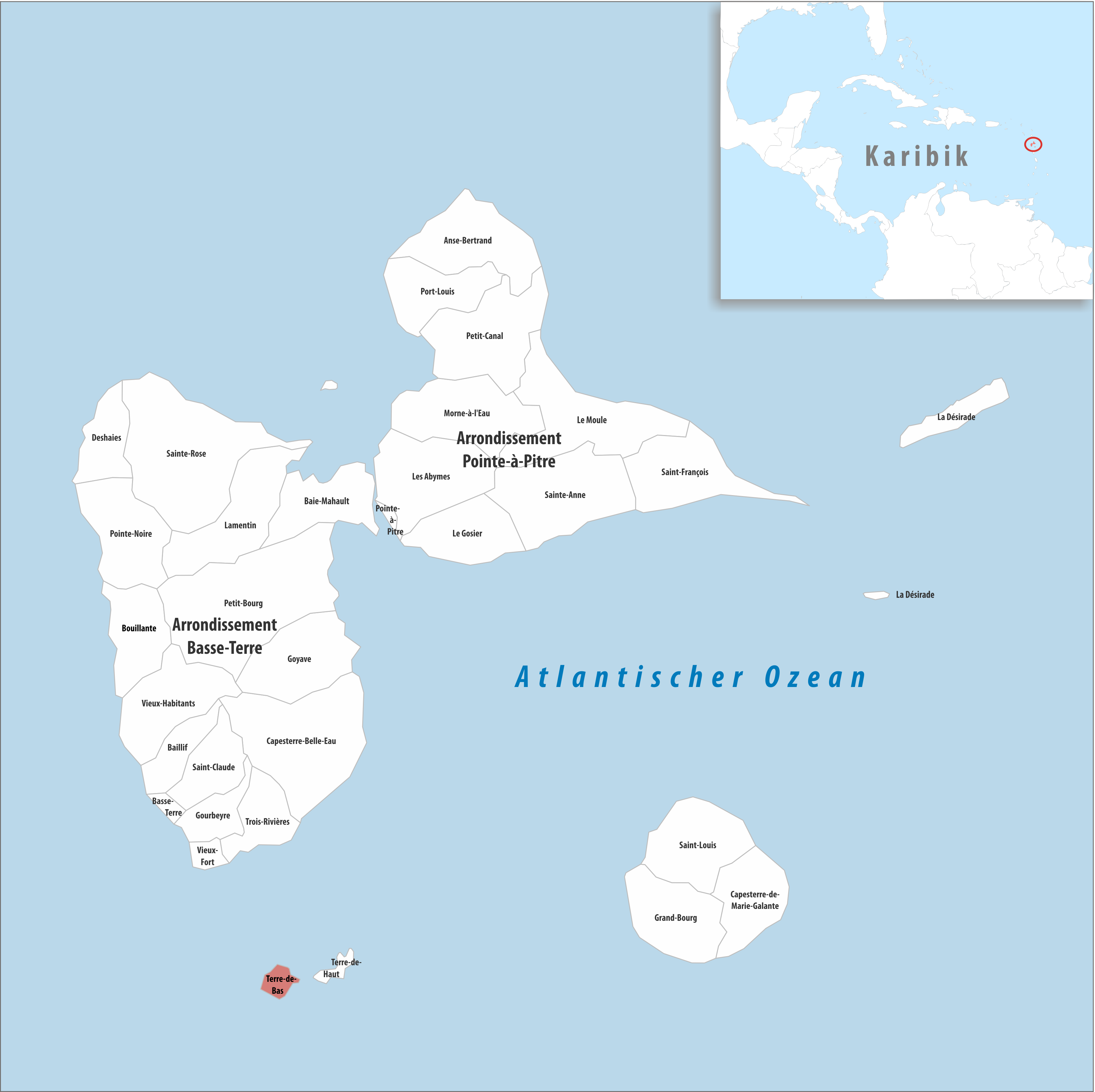
- Location of the commune (in red) within Guadeloupe
- Location of Terre-de-Bas
- Coordinates: 15°51′00″N 61°39′00″W
- Country: France
- Overseas region and department: Guadeloupe
- Arrondissement: Basse-Terre
- Canton: Trois-Rivières
- Intercommunality: CA Grand Sud Caraïbe

Government
  - Mayor (2020–2026): Rolande Nadille
- Area^{1}: 6.80 km^{2} (2.63 sq mi)
- Highest elevation: 293 m (961 ft)
- Lowest elevation: 0 m (0 ft)
- Population (2023): 873
  - Density: 128/km^{2} (333/sq mi)
- Time zone: UTC−04:00 (AST)
- INSEE/Postal code: 97130 /97136
- ^{1} French Land Register data, which excludes lakes, ponds, glaciers > 1 km^{2} (0.386 sq mi or 247 acres) and river estuaries.

Terre-de-Bas (French pronunciation: [tɛʁ də ba]; Guadeloupean Creole: Tèdéba) is a commune in the French overseas department and region of Guadeloupe, in the Lesser Antilles. Terre-de-Bas is made up of Terre-de-Bas Island and several uninhabited islands and islets in the group of Les Saintes islands (La Coche; Les Augustins; Le Pâté), to the southwest of Guadeloupe's mainland.

== Education ==
Public preschools and primary schools:

- Ecole primaire Petites Anses
- Ecole maternelle Grande Anse

== See also ==
- Communes of the Guadeloupe department
