= Îlet à Cabrit =

Island in Guadeloupe, France

Native name: Petite Martinique
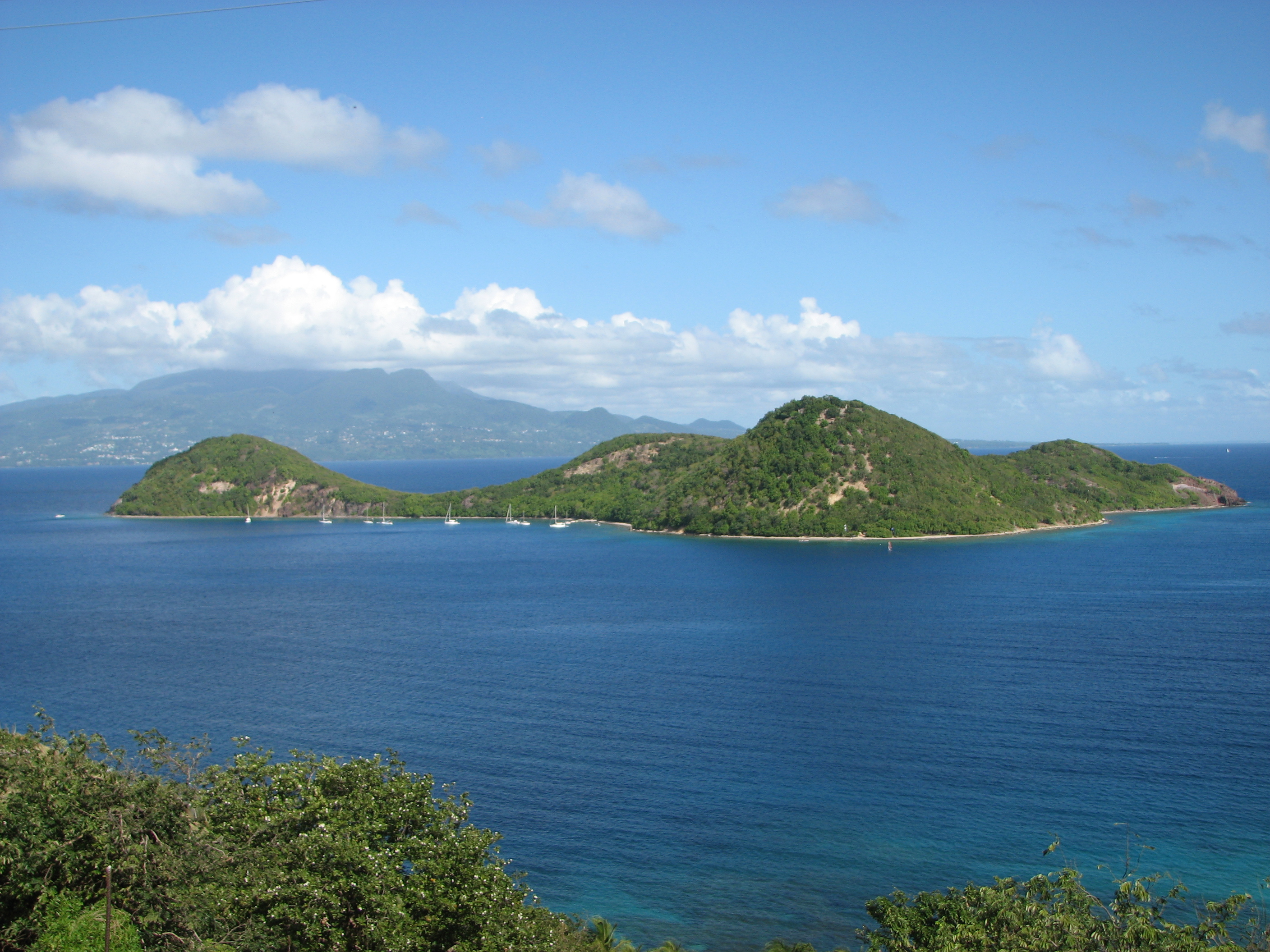
- View of Îlet à Cabrit from Terre-de-Haut Island.

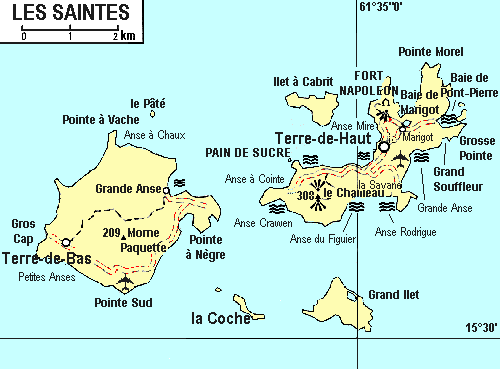
- Îlet à Cabrit lies to the north of Terre-de-Haut Island

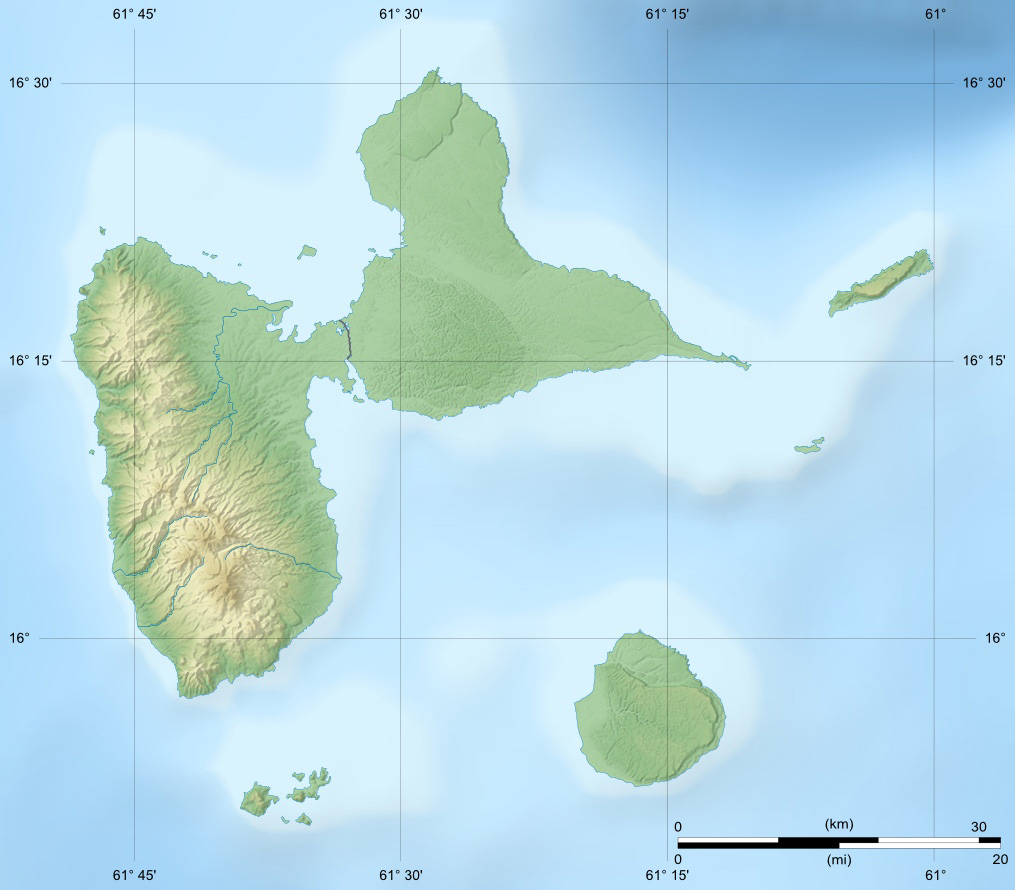
- Location within Guadeloupe Location within Lesser Antilles Location within the Caribbean

Geography
- Coordinates: 15°52′30″N 61°35′40″W
- Archipelago: Les Saintes
- Area: 0.45 km^{2} (0.17 sq mi)
- Highest elevation: 90 m (300 ft)
- Highest point: Morne Joséphine

Administration
- France
- Overseas department: Guadeloupe
- Canton: Trois-Rivières
- Commune: Terre-de-Haut
- Mayor: Louis Molinié

Îlet à Cabrit (French pronunciation: [ile a kabʁi]), officially French: îlet à Cabrit des Saintes (literally: Goat Island of Les Saintes), is an island in the Îles des Saintes, Guadeloupe, the Lesser Antilles. It belongs to the commune of Terre-de-Haut.

== Geography ==
Îlet to Cabrit is located, at 1 km (0.62 mi) at the northwest of Terre-de-Haut Island, closing partially the Les Saintes Bay.

The island is approximately 1.2 km (0.75 mi) from east to west and 750 m (0.47 mi) from north to south. Its highest mount up to 90 m (300 ft), Morne Joséphine hill. it contains three headlands, Pointe à Cabrit on the West, Pointe Sable in the South and Pointe Bombarde in the East, which frame three coves: Anse sous le vent in the southwest, Anse du Bananier in the southeast and Anse du Petit Etang in the North.

By its localization, Îlet à Cabrit creates two passages into the Bay of les Saintes, la Baleine passage to the East and Pain de Sucre passage in the South, which constitute both access roads to the harbours of Mouillage and Fond-du-Curé.

== History ==
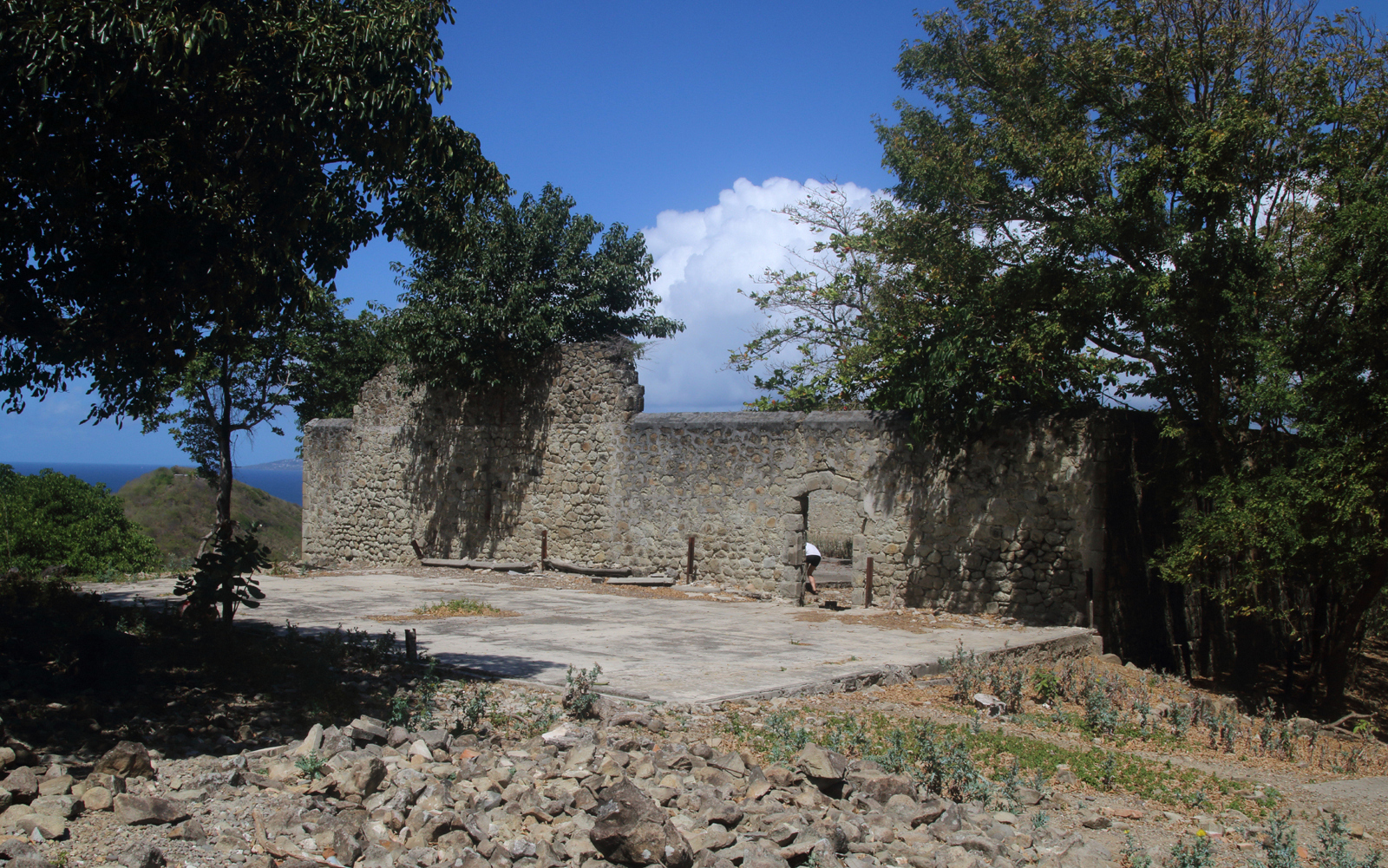
Fort Joséphine

The strategic position of Petite Martinique (former name of Îlet à Cabrit) always served of sentinel's place. In 1777, France built, at the top of Morne de la Reine hill (Former name of Morne Josephine hill), a fortification named Fort de la Reine renamed later Fort Joséphine. It formed then a defensive system with the Fort Napoléon and the numerous battery of the archipelago.

The British, who occupied les Saintes in 1809, kept Fort Joséphine and added water butt to it. After the return of les Saintes under French dominion, Fort Joséphine became a penitentiary from 1851, but it was ravaged by a hurricane, on September 6, 1865. It continued however to welcome convicts on the way towards Îles du Salut, in French Guiana until 1902.

In 1871, Îlet à Cabrit became a place of quarantine: a lazaretto, was opened instead of the penitentiary.

== Notes and references ==
- Péron, Patrick (2003), ASPP (Association Saintoise de Protection du Patrimoine) (ed.), Petite histoire de Terre de Haut: île française d'Amérique, pp. 18–24
