= Anse Rodrigue, Terre-de-Haut =

Anse Rodrigue
- Quartier
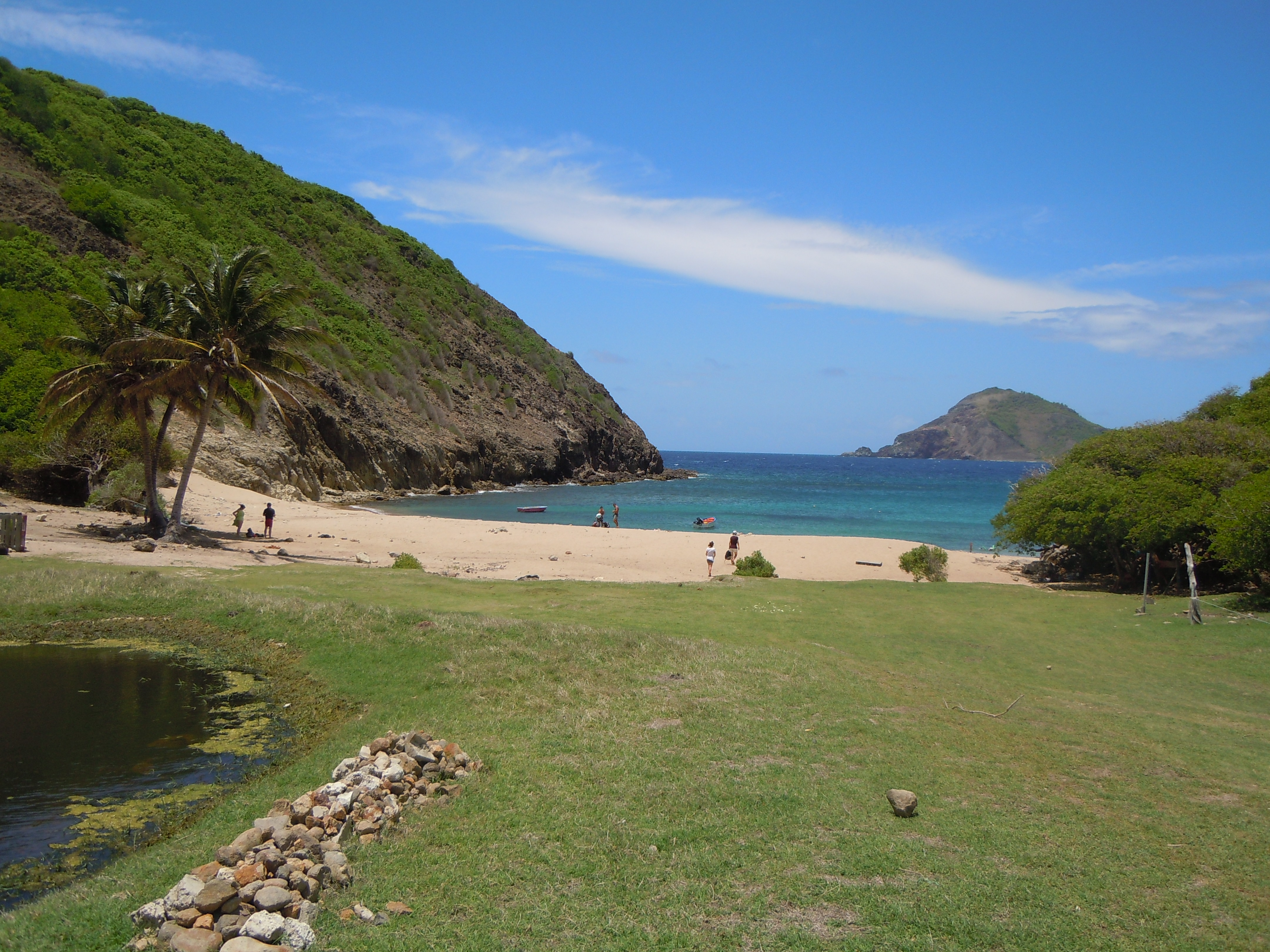

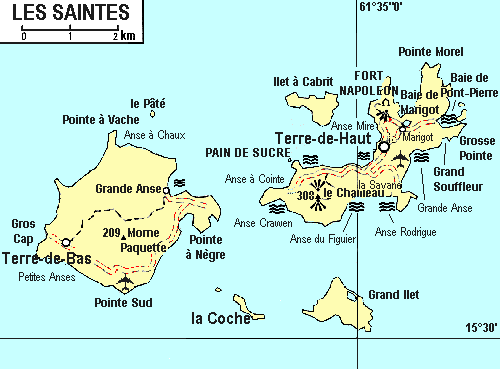
- Coordinates: 15°51′34″N 61°34′48″W
- Country: France
- Overseas department: Guadeloupe
- Canton: les Saintes
- commune: Terre-de-Haut

Anse Rodrigue is a quartier of Terre-de-Haut Island, located in Îles des Saintes archipelago in the Caribbean. It is located in the eastern part of the island. It is built around a white sand beach called Anse Rodrigue and between two mounts called Morne à Craie and Morne Fourmi.
