= Fort Napoléon, Terre-de-Haut =

Fort Napoléon
- Quartier
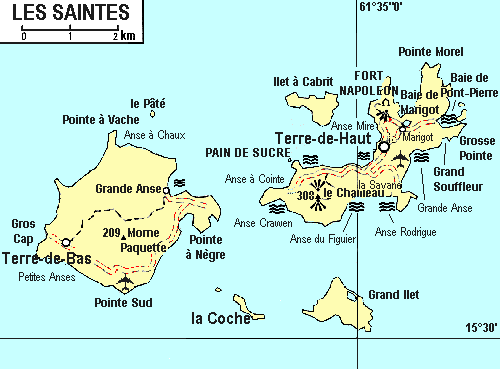
- Coordinates: 15°52′26″N 61°34′53″W
- Country: France
- Overseas department: Guadeloupe
- Canton: les Saintes
- commune: Terre-de-Haut

Fort Napoléon (French pronunciation: [fɔʁ napɔleɔ̃]) is a quartier of Terre-de-Haut Island, located in Îles des Saintes archipelago in the Caribbean. It is located in the north part of the island. The Fort Napoléon is situated on this quartier.
