= Fond-du-Curé =

- Quartier
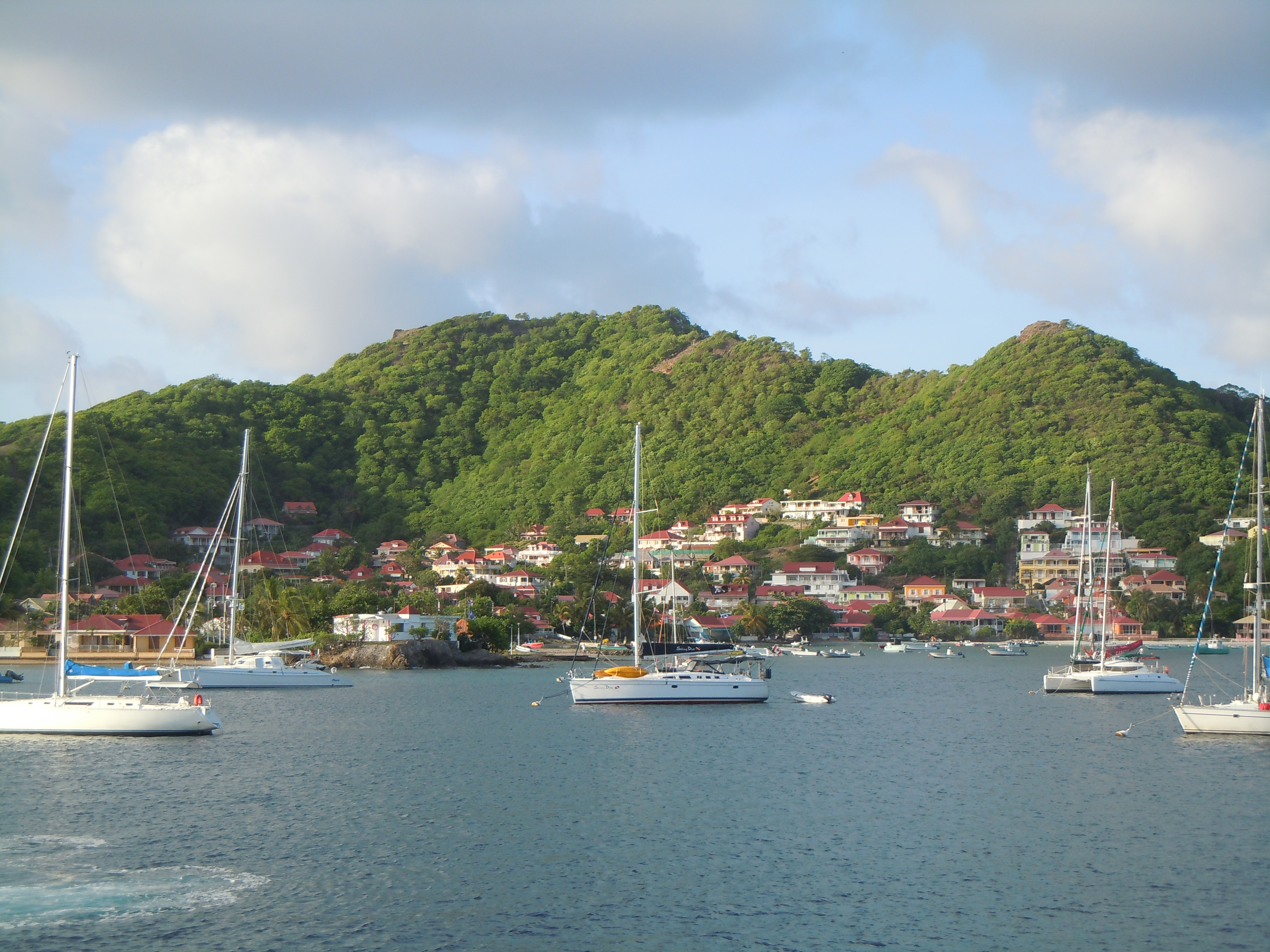

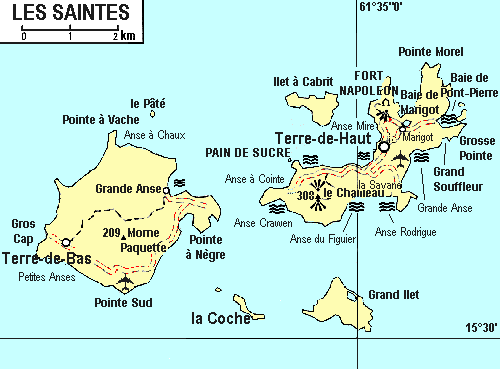
- Coordinates: 15°51′50″N 61°35′04″W
- Country: France
- Overseas department: Guadeloupe
- Canton: Les Saintes
- commune: Terre-de-Haut

Fond-du-Curé (French pronunciation: [fɔ̃ dy kyʁe]) is a quartier of Terre-de-Haut Island, located in Les Saintes, Guadeloupe. It is located in the central part of the island. This is the main village of Terre-de-Haut Island. It is a natural anchorage in the bay of Les Saintes. The commercial activity of the island are focused on this village, shops, market, fishmarket, bakeries, groceries, restaurants, bars, hotels and guest houses. It hosts the majority of the administrative office of the island, the Post office, the community clinic, and the Mairie (City hall) of Terre-de-Haut. The port of goods transportation is located in Fond-du-Curé. A lot of fishermen live in this quartier. The church Notre-Dame de l'Assomption is included in it, but is located at the limit of Mouillage.

== To See ==
- The beach of Fond-du-Curé: A beach with lot of traditional Saintoise (traditional boat) used by the local fishermen.
- The square of Hazier du Buisson: The main place of the quartier, located in front the city hall. It is a lively and flowery place.
- Notre Dame de l'Assomption's church: An ancient Roman Catholic church built at the beginning of the 19th century.
