= Anse Crawen, Terre-de-Haut =

Anse Crawen
- Quartier
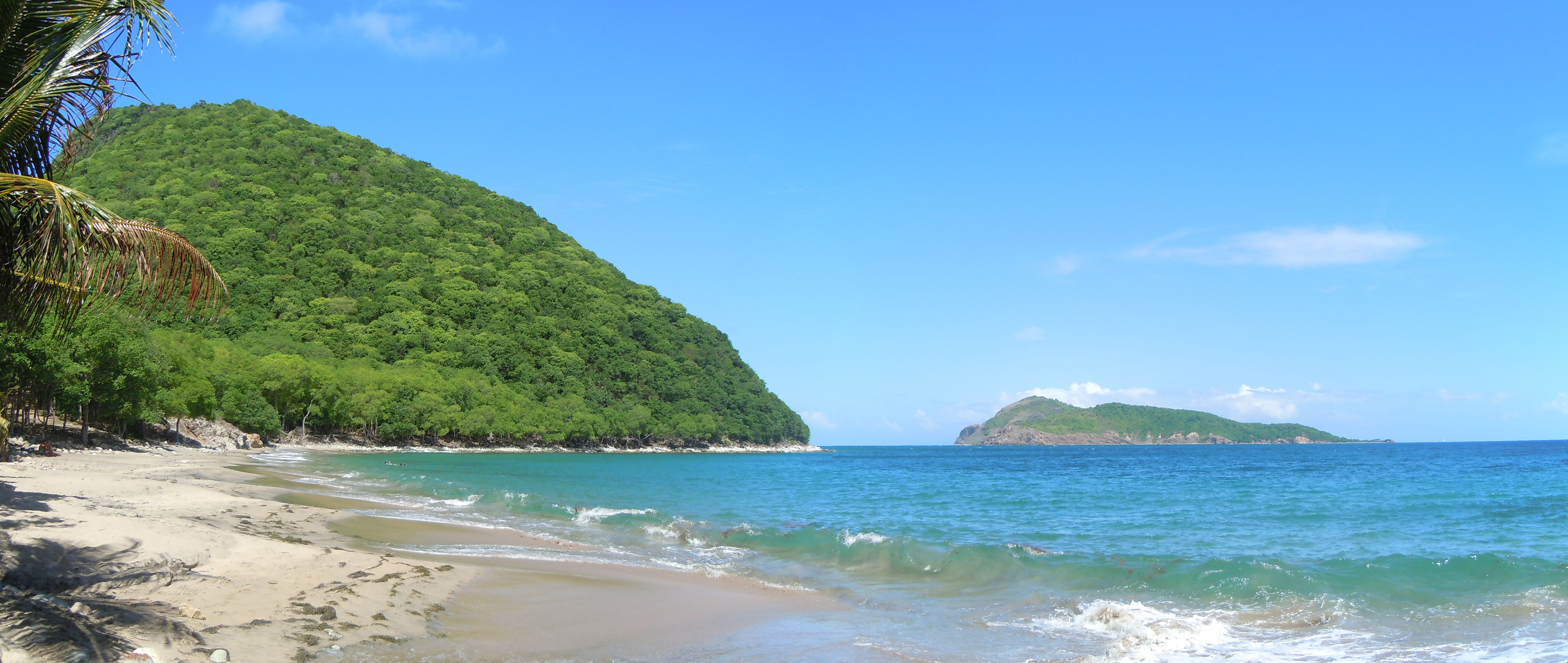

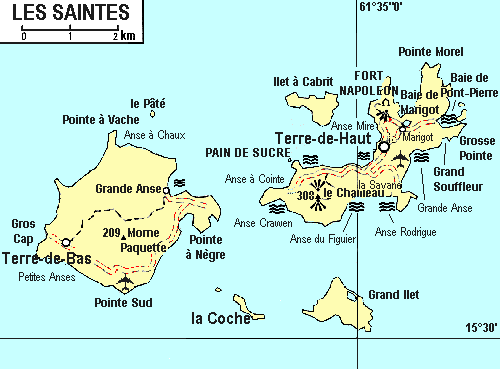
- Coordinates: 15°51′29″N 61°36′08″W
- Country: France
- Overseas department: Guadeloupe
- Canton: les Saintes
- commune: Terre-de-Haut

Anse Crawen is a quartier of Terre-de-Haut Island, located in Îles des Saintes archipelago in the Caribbean. It is located in the southwestern part of the island, and is the least inhabited place on the island.
