= Marigot, Terre-de-Haut =

Marigot
- Quartier
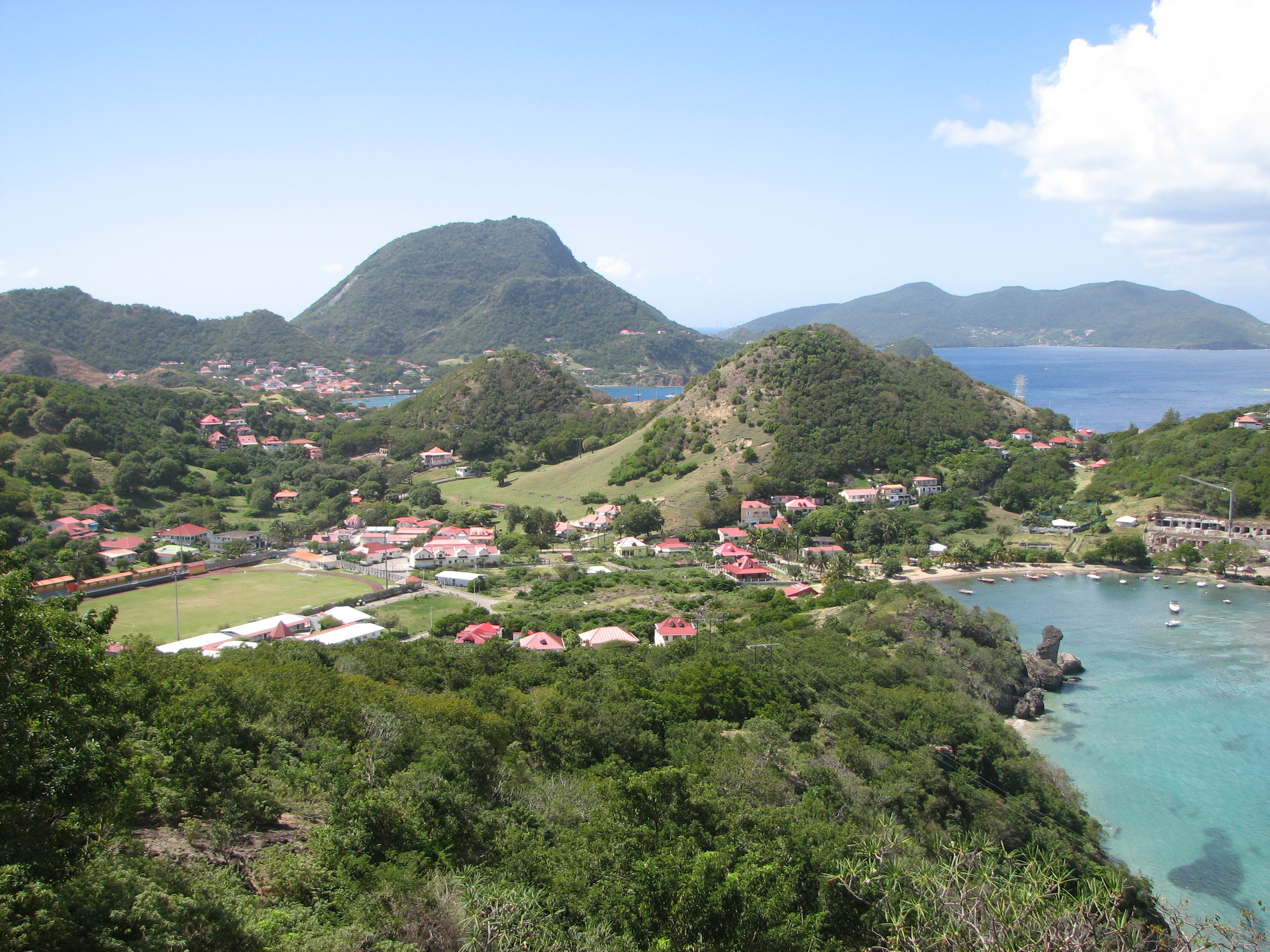
- Marigot village

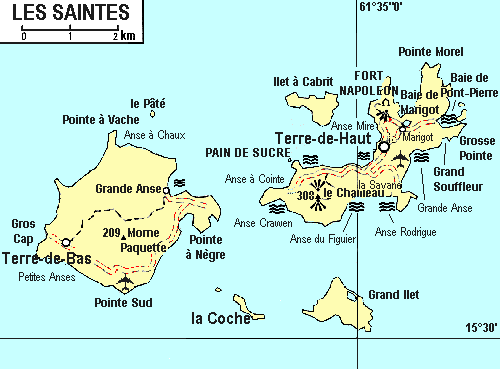
- Coordinates: 15°52′15″N 61°34′37″W
- Country: France
- Overseas department: Guadeloupe
- Canton: les Saintes
- commune: Terre-de-Haut

Marigot is a quartier of Terre-de-Haut Island, located in Îles des Saintes archipelago in the Caribbean. It is located in the northeastern part of the island. It is a residential area. The stadium, the middle school, and the Gendarmerie Nationale office are located on this place. In the past it was a big salt pond. The Bay of Marigot is one of the famous beach of the island.
