= Anse Mire =

Anse-Mire
- Bay
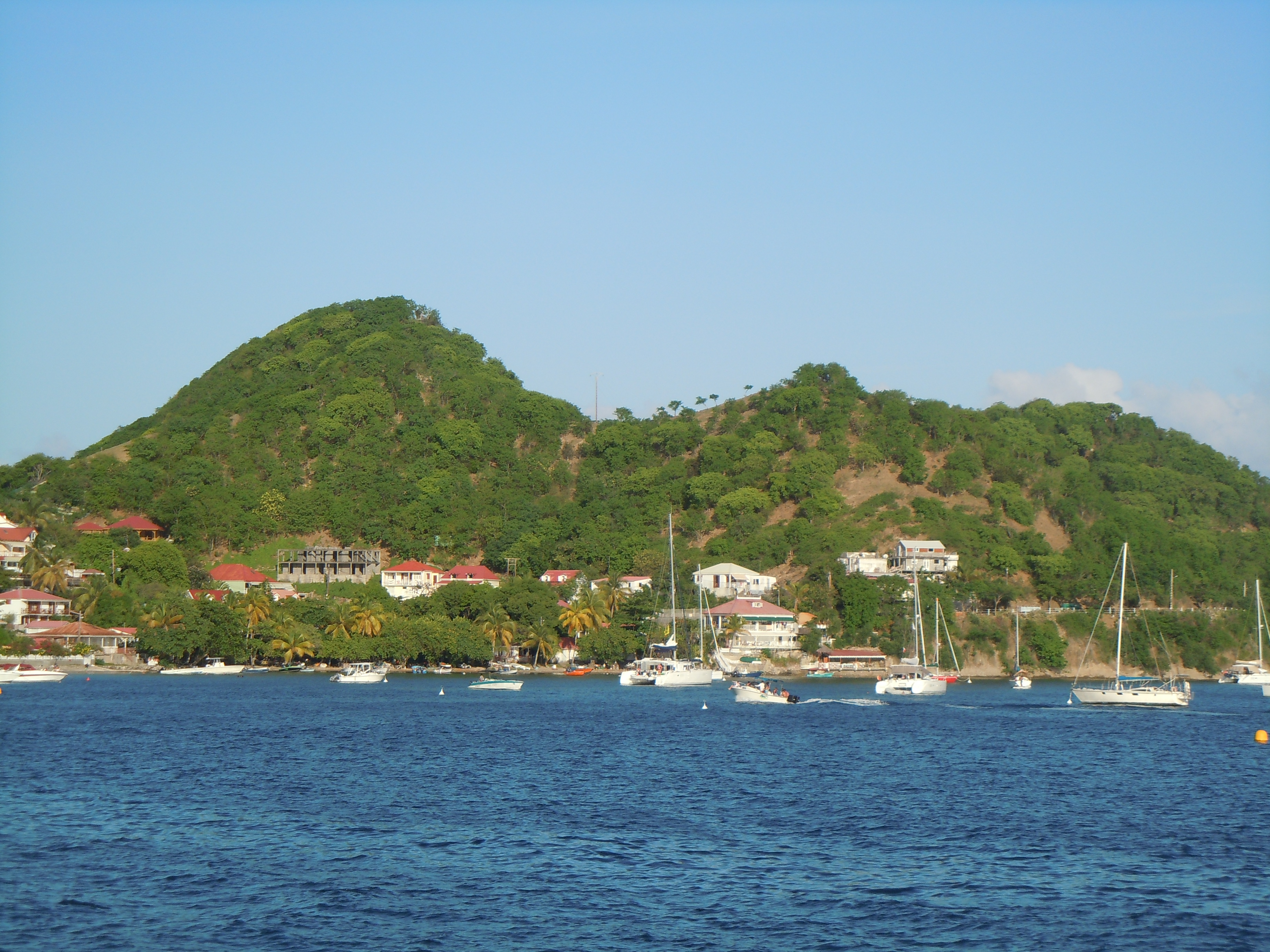

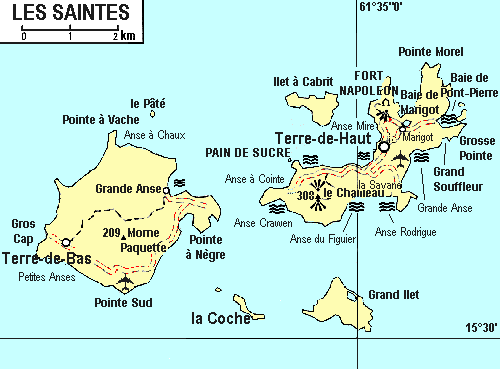
- Coordinates: 15°52′17″N 61°34′57″W
- Country: France
- Overseas department: Guadeloupe
- Canton: les Saintes
- commune: Terre-de-Haut

Anse-Mire (French pronunciation: [ɑ̃s miʁ]) is a bay of Terre-de-Haut Island, located in Îles des Saintes archipelago in the Caribbean. It is located in the north part of the island.
