= Vieille Anse, Terre-de-Haut =

Vieille Anse
- Quartier
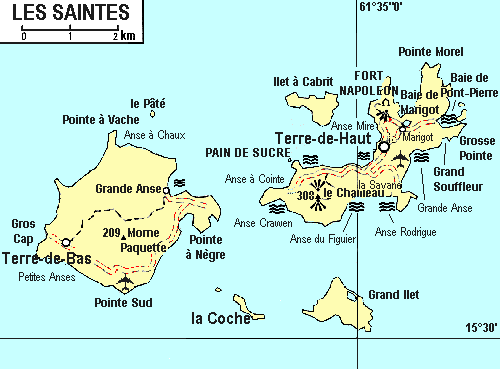
- Coordinates: 15°52′30″N 61°34′45″W
- Country: France
- Overseas department: Guadeloupe
- Canton: les Saintes
- commune: Terre-de-Haut

Vieille Anse (French pronunciation: [vjɛj ɑ̃s]) is a quartier of Terre-de-Haut Island, located in Îles des Saintes archipelago in the Caribbean. It is located in the north part of the island.
