= Anse à Cointe, Terre-de-Haut =

Anse à Cointe
- Quartier
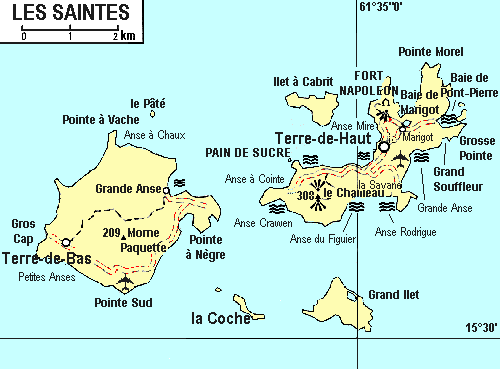
- Coordinates: 15°51′35″N 61°36′01″W
- Country: France
- Overseas department: Guadeloupe
- Canton: les Saintes
- commune: Terre-de-Haut

Anse à Cointe (French pronunciation: [ɑ̃s a kwɛ̃t]) is a quartier of Terre-de-Haut Island, located in Îles des Saintes archipelago in the Caribbean. It is located in the southwestern part of the island. It is a natural anchorage with a hotel le bois joli.

== To see ==
- The beach: A small beautiful beach of white sand and turquoise water.
