= Coquelet, Terre-de-Haut =

Coquelet
- Quartier
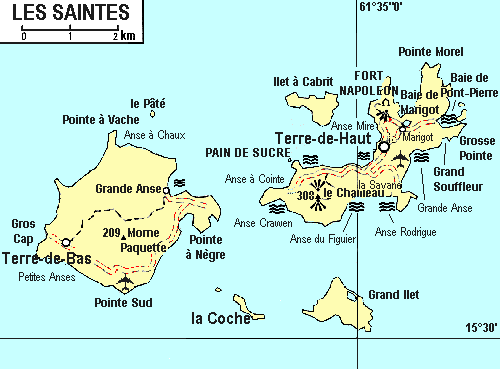
- Coordinates: 15°52′25″N 61°35′04″W
- Country: France
- Overseas department: Guadeloupe
- Canton: les Saintes
- commune: Terre-de-Haut

Coquelet is a quartier of Terre-de-Haut Island, located in the Îles des Saintes archipelago in the Caribbean, part of the French overseas department of Guadeloupe. It is located in the northwestern part of the island, near Pointe Coquelet.
