= Anse Galet, Terre-de-Haut =

Anse Galet
- Quartier
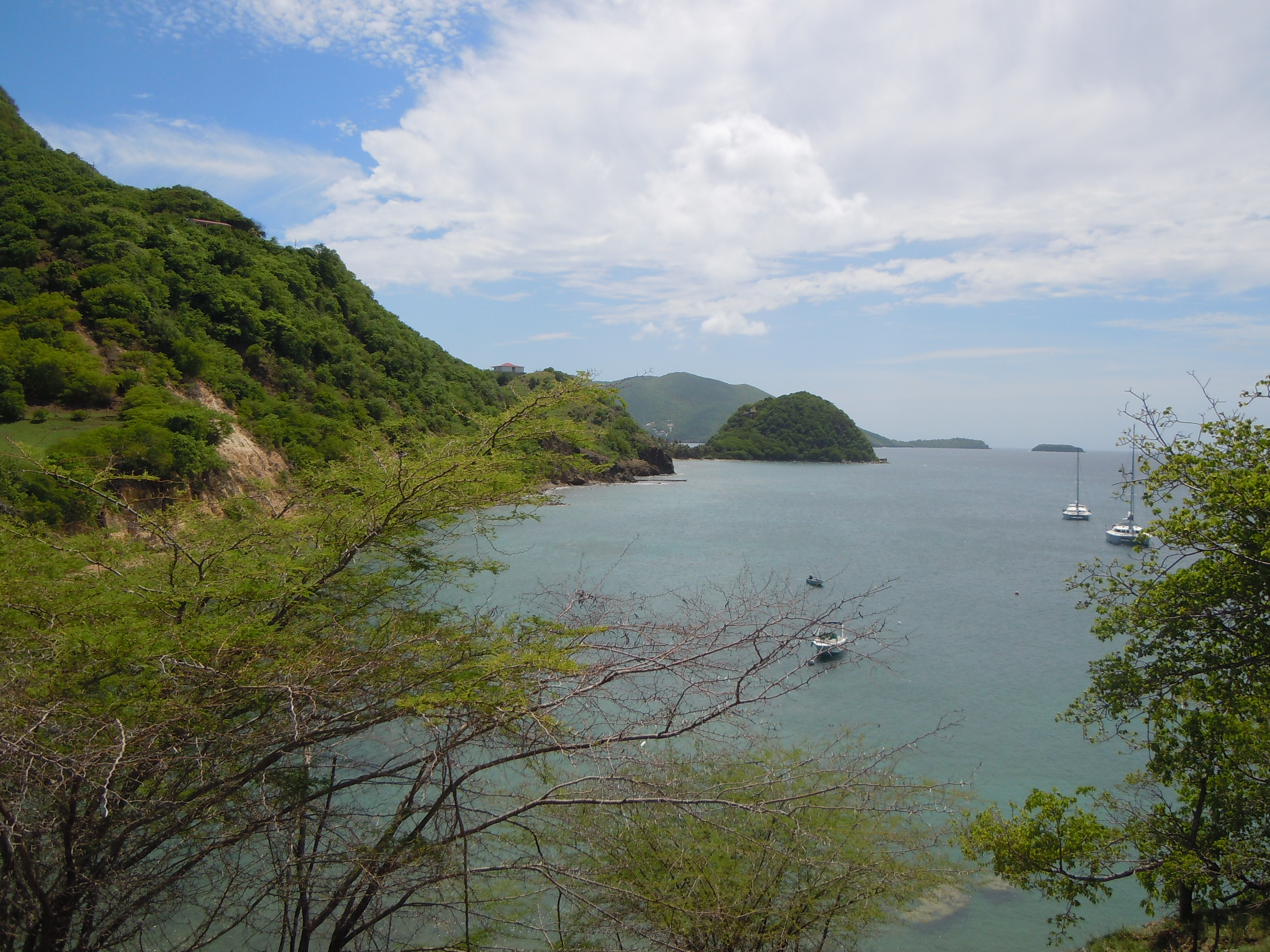

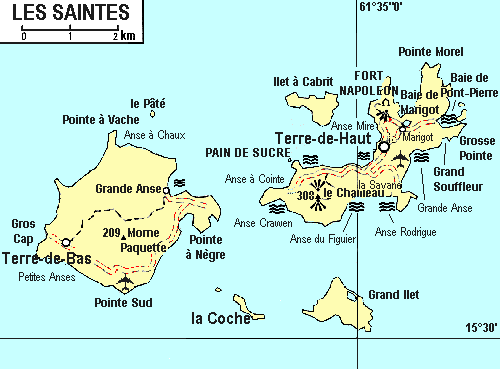
- Coordinates: 15°51′49″N 61°35′24″W
- Country: France
- Overseas department: Guadeloupe
- Canton: les Saintes
- commune: Terre-de-Haut

Anse Galet is a quartier of Terre-de-Haut Island, located in Îles des Saintes archipelago in the Caribbean. It is located in the Southwestern part of the island.
