= Pompierre, Terre-de-Haut =

Pompierre
- Quartier
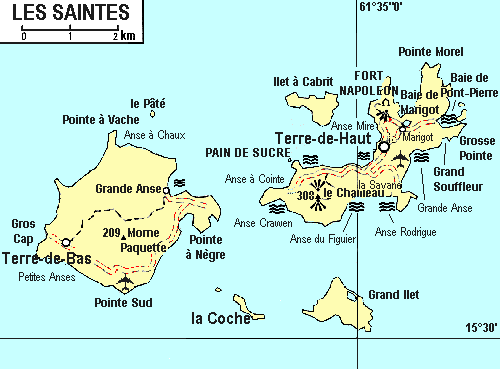
- Coordinates: 15°52′19″N 61°34′15″W
- Country: France
- Overseas department: Guadeloupe
- Canton: Les Saintes
- Commune: Terre-de-Haut

Pompierre (French pronunciation: [pɔ̃pjɛʁ], Antillean Creole: Ponpiè) is a neighbourhood (quartier) of Terre-de-Haut Island, located in the French commune of Terre-de-Haut, Saintes, Guadeloupe, the Caribbean. It is located in the northeastern part of the island. The Pompierre Beach is situated on this quarter.
