= Fort Napoleon =

Fort Napoleon may refer to:

- Fort Napoleon, Almaraz, in Spain; a central feature during the Battle of Almaraz fought on 18/19 May 1812 during the Peninsula War
- Fort Napoléon des Saintes in Guadeloupe
- Fort Napoleon, Ostend in Belgium
- Fort Napoléon, Toulon in France
- Fort Napoléon, later renamed Fort Blücher, at Wesel in Germany
- Fort Napoléon, les Saintes
