= Pain-de-Sucre =

- Quartier
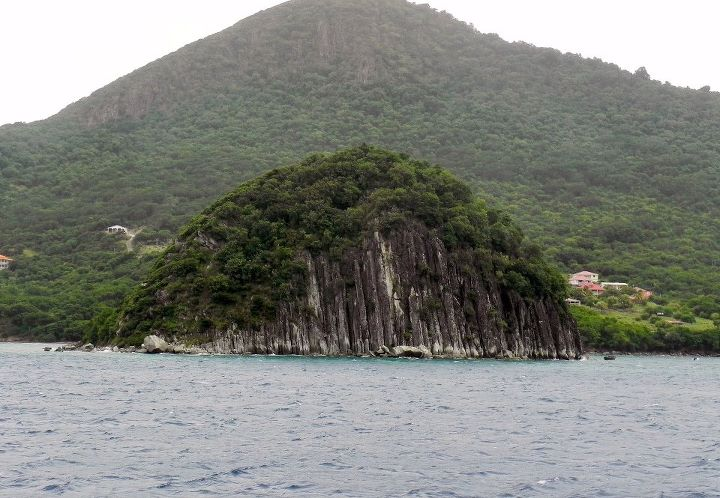
- Pain de sucre hill with its village behind

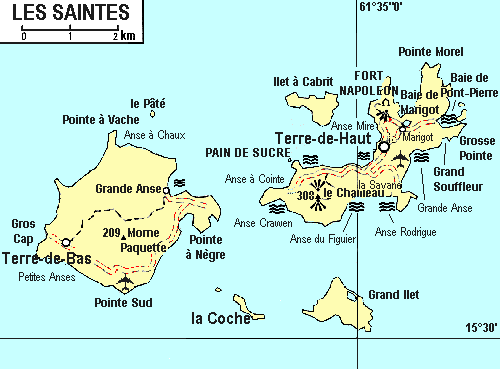
- Coordinates: 15°51′40″N 61°35′54″W
- Country: France
- Overseas department: Guadeloupe
- Canton: Les Saintes
- commune: Terre-de-Haut

Pain-de-Sucre (French pronunciation: [pɛ̃ də sykʁ]) is a neighbourhood (quartier) of Terre-de-Haut Island, located in Les Saintes, Guadeloupe. It is located in the southwestern part of the island. This is a residential quartier of Terre-de-Haut Island. It is a natural anchorage. The famous Pain de sucre of the archipelago is located on this quartier.

== To see ==
- Pain de sucre: This is a famous mountain of les Saintes. It is constituted by an alignment of basalt columns plunging into the blue waters of the bay of les Saintes.
- The beaches called Petite Anse du Pain de sucre and Anse Devant are two small beautiful beaches of white sand and turquoise water.
