= Prés Cassin, Terre-de-Haut =

Prés Cassin
- Quartier
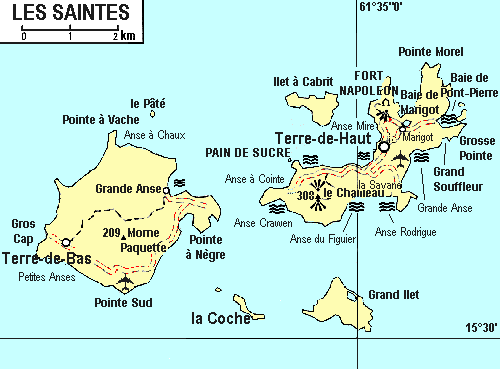
- Coordinates: 15°51′44″N 61°35′21″W
- Country: France
- Overseas department: Guadeloupe
- Canton: les Saintes
- commune: Terre-de-Haut

Prés Cassin (French pronunciation: [pʁe kasɛ̃]) is a quartier of Terre-de-Haut Island, located in Îles des Saintes archipelago in the Caribbean. It is located in the southwestern part of the island.
