= Maison blanche, Terre-de-Haut =

Maison blanche
- Quartier
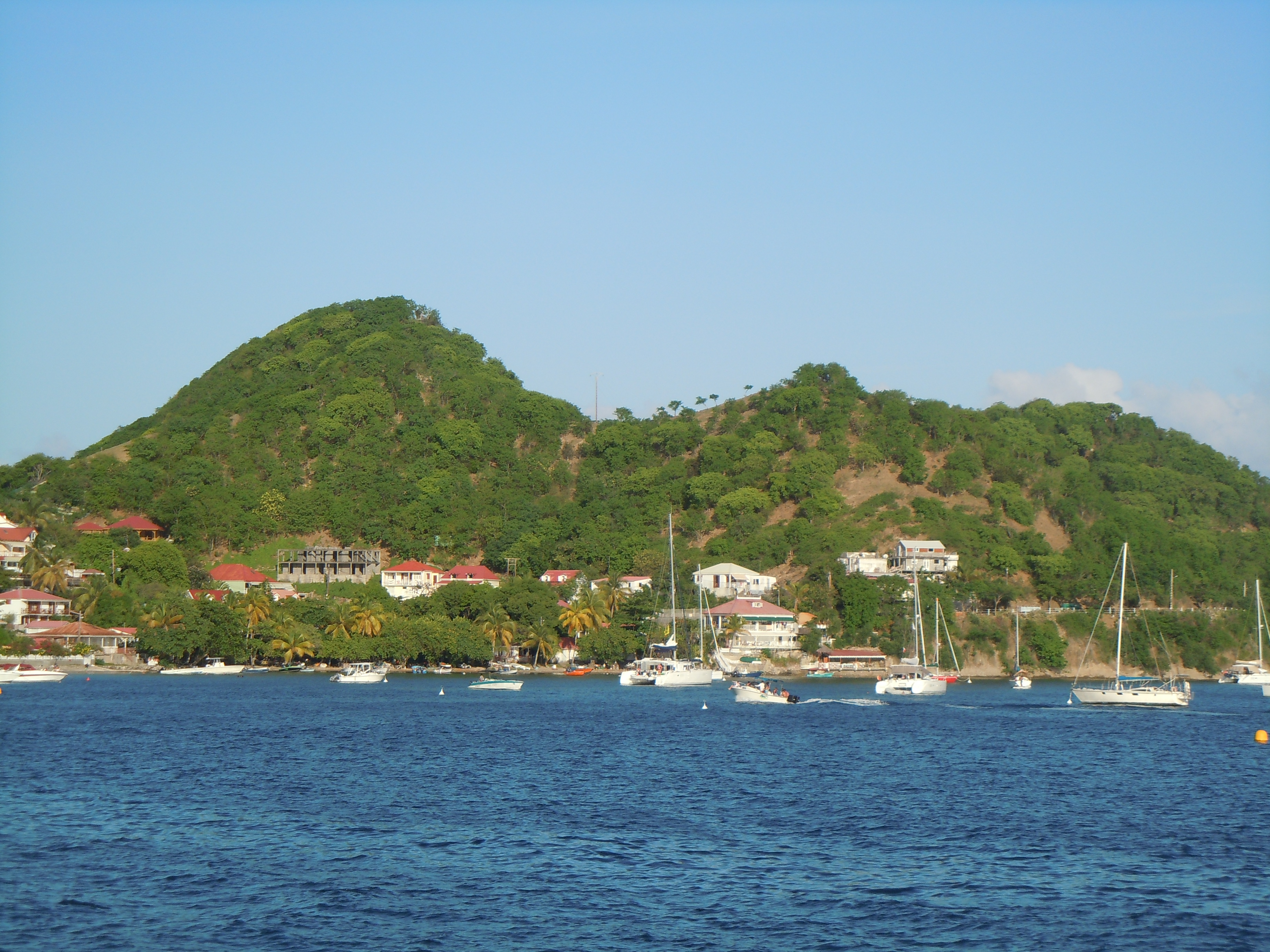

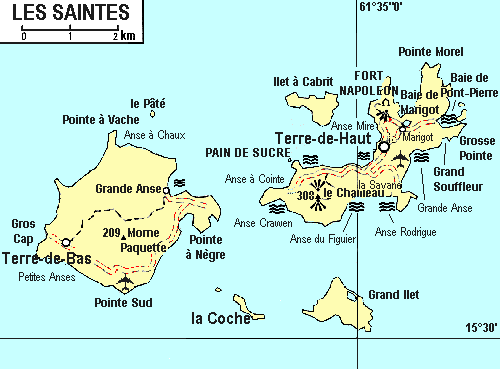
- Coordinates: 15°52′24″N 61°34′50″W
- Country: France
- Overseas department: Guadeloupe
- Canton: les Saintes
- commune: Terre-de-Haut

Maison blanche (French pronunciation: [mɛzɔ̃ blɑ̃ʃ]) is a quartier of Terre-de-Haut Island, located in Îles des Saintes archipelago in the Caribbean. It is located in the north part of the island.
