= La Convalescence, Terre-de-Haut =

La Convalescence
- Quartier
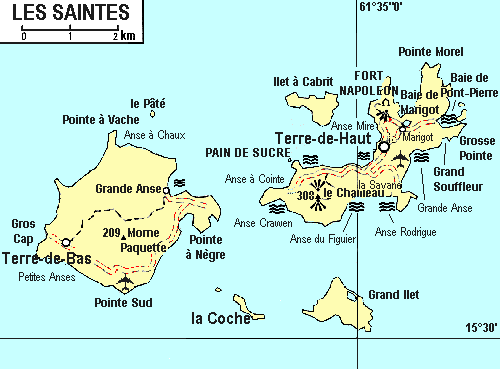
- Coordinates: 15°51′45″N 61°35′32″W
- Country: France
- Overseas department: Guadeloupe
- Canton: les Saintes
- commune: Terre-de-Haut

La Convalescence (French pronunciation: [la kɔ̃valɛsɑ̃s]) is a quartier of Terre-de-Haut Island, located in Îles des Saintes archipelago in the Caribbean. It is located in the Southwestern part of the island. It is built on a mount called La Convalescence also called Morne Gros Dos.
