= Grande-Anse, Terre-de-Haut =

Grande-Anse
- Quartier
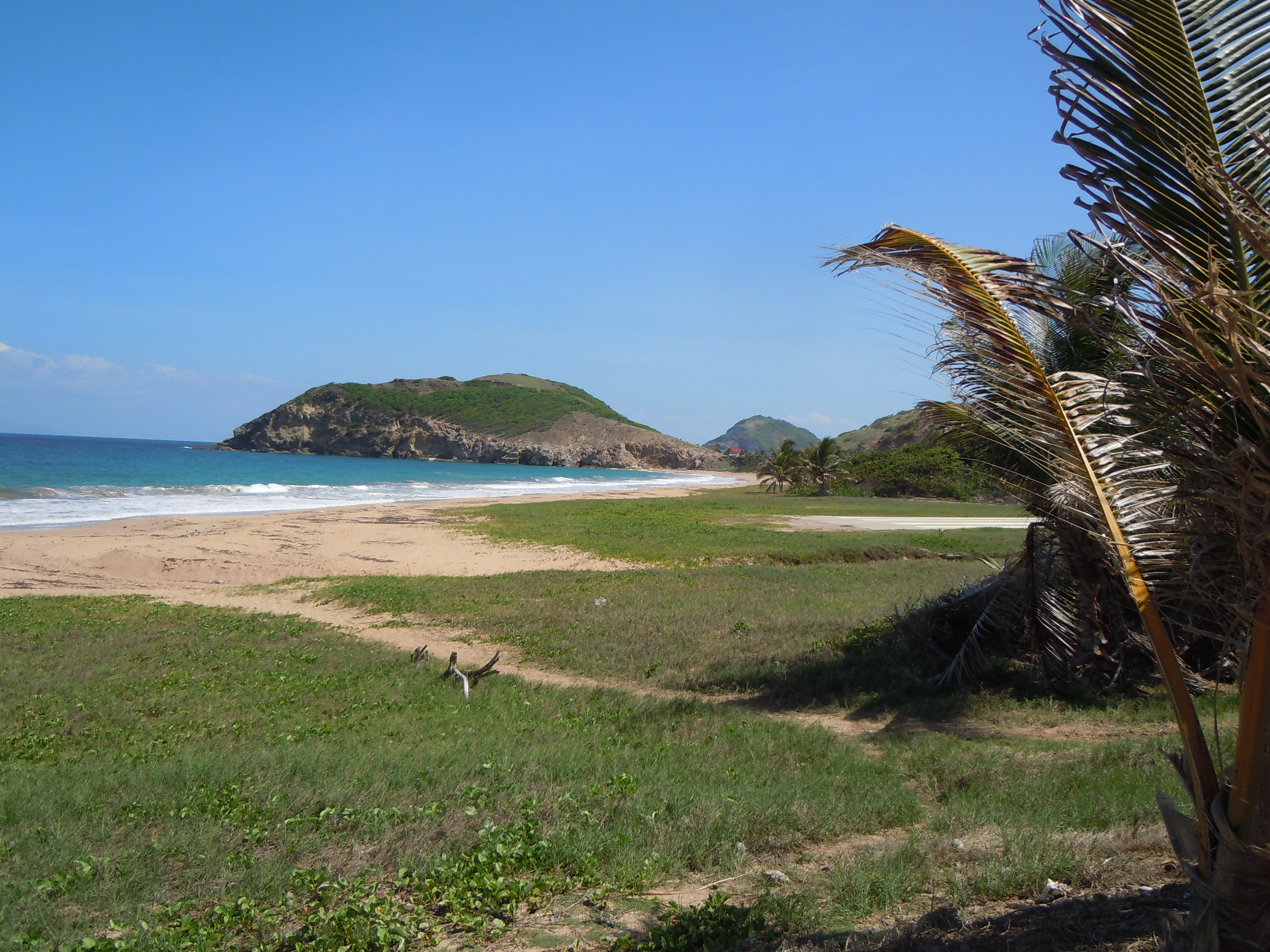

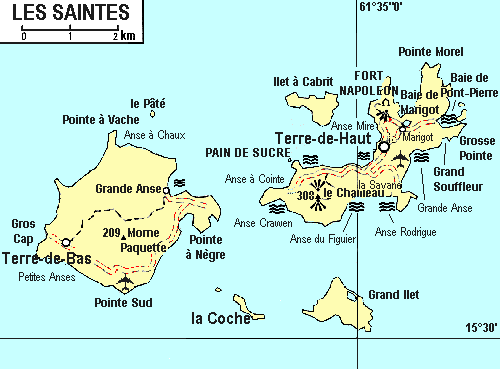
- Coordinates: 15°51′53″N 61°34′45″W
- Country: France
- Overseas department: Guadeloupe
- Canton: les Saintes
- commune: Terre-de-Haut

Grande-Anse (French pronunciation: [ɡʁɑ̃dɑ̃s]) is a quartier of Terre-de-Haut Island, located in the Îles des Saintes archipelago in the Caribbean. It is situated in the eastern part of the island. The island's cemetery and the terminal of Les Saintes Airport are located in Grande-Anse. Grande-Anse is also home to the island's largest beach. Many rental cottages are present in the area.

== To See ==
- "Grande Anse" beach: A long, golden-sand beach exposed to the trade winds, making the water agitated and rough. It is not recommended for swimming but is frequented by surfers.
- The cemetery: It is a Catholic cemetery with white graves and black crucifixes. Conch shells decorate some of the graves.
