= La Coulée, Terre-de-Haut =

Pompierre
- Quartier
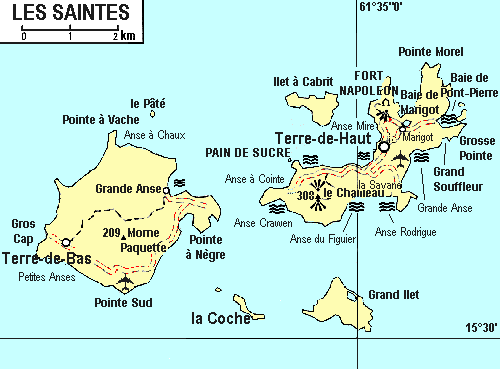
- Coordinates: 15°52′11″N 61°34′46″W
- Country: France
- Overseas department: Guadeloupe
- Canton: les Saintes
- commune: Terre-de-Haut

La Coulée (French pronunciation: [la kule]) is a quartier of Terre-de-Haut Island, located in Îles des Saintes archipelago in the Caribbean. It is located in the northeastern part of the island.
