= Anse Figuier, Terre-de-Haut =

Anse Figuier
- Quartier
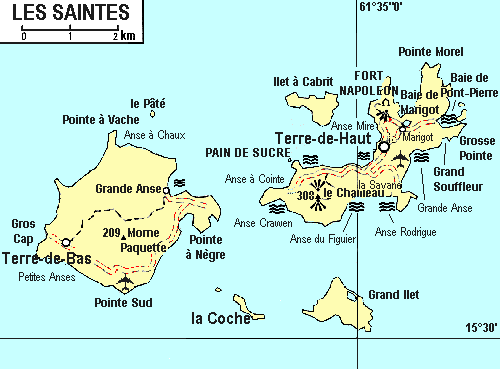
- Coordinates: 15°51′33″N 61°35′11″W
- Country: France
- Overseas department: Guadeloupe
- Canton: les Saintes
- commune: Terre-de-Haut

Anse Figuier (French pronunciation: [ɑ̃s fiɡje]) is a quartier of Terre-de-Haut Island, located in Îles des Saintes archipelago in the Caribbean. Located in the Southern part of the island, it is built around a golden sandy beach called Anse Figuier.
