= Jardin exotique du Fort Napoléon =

Botanical garden in Guadeloupe

Coordinates: 15.8752°N 61.5825°W

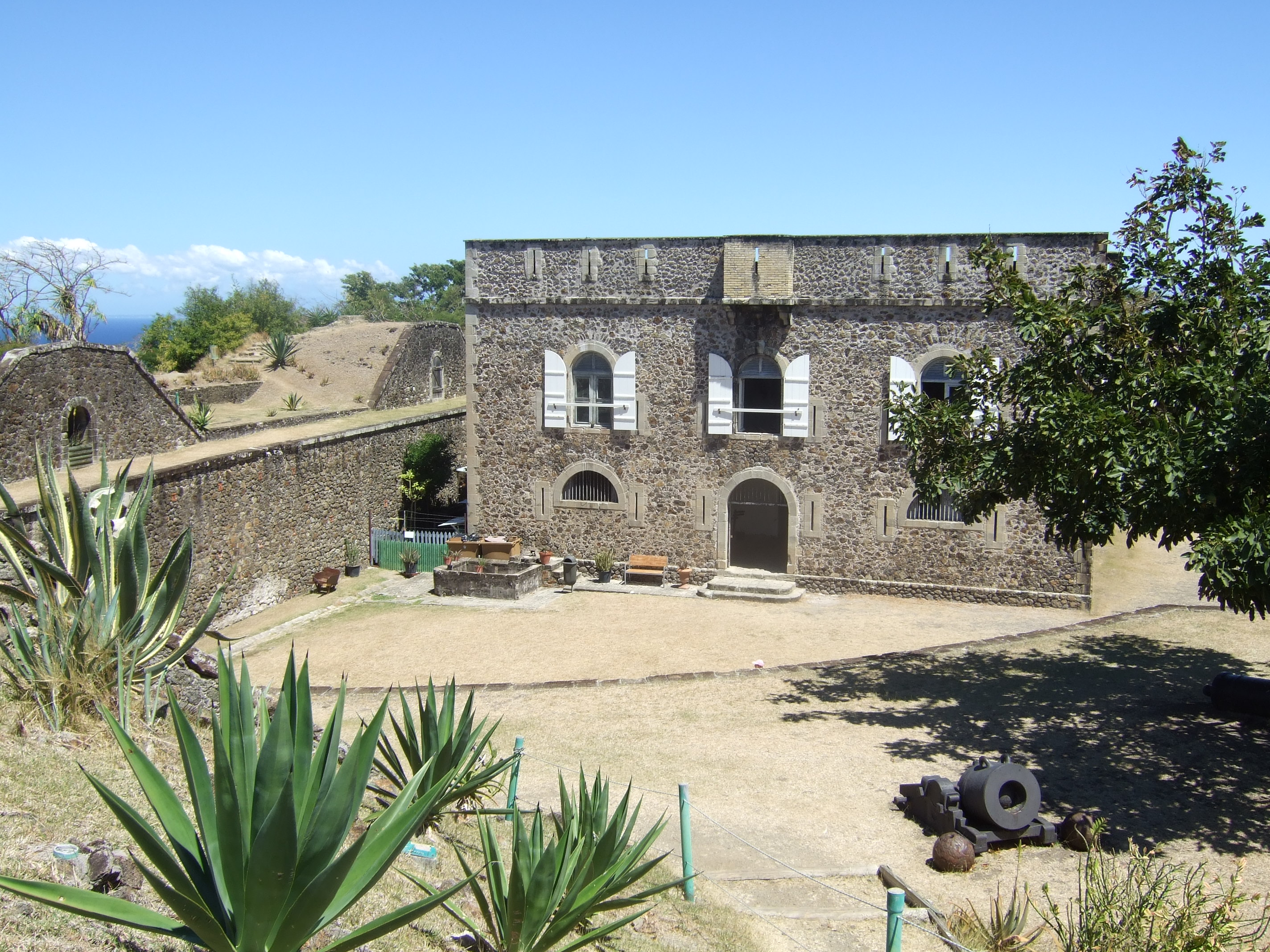
Fort Napoléon des Saintes

The Jardin exotique du Fort Napoléon is a botanical garden specializing in succulents. It is located on the grounds of Fort Napoléon at 120 m altitude above Terre-de-Haut, Îles des Saintes, and is open daily.

Fort Napoléon was first erected in 1777 as Fort Louis, destroyed by the British in 1809, rebuilt from 1844, and given its present name during the reign of Napoleon III of France. Today's exotic garden was created in 1984 and paired with the Jardin Exotique de Monaco in 1986, with whom it began plant exchanges in 1987.

Today the garden contains a collection of local plants and other succulents including Agavaceae, Cactaceae, succulent Euphorbia, and Liliaceae. Of particular interest are its collections of rare and endangered Cactaceae, including Mammillaria nivosa, Melocactus intortus, Opuntia dillenii, Opuntia rubescens, Opuntia triacantha, Opuntia tuna, Pereskia aculeata, Pilosocereus nobilis, and Selenicereus grandiflorus.

== See also ==
- List of botanical gardens in France
