= Pompierre Beach =

Beach in Terre-de-Haut, Guadeloupe

Coordinates: 15°52′19″N 61°34′15″W

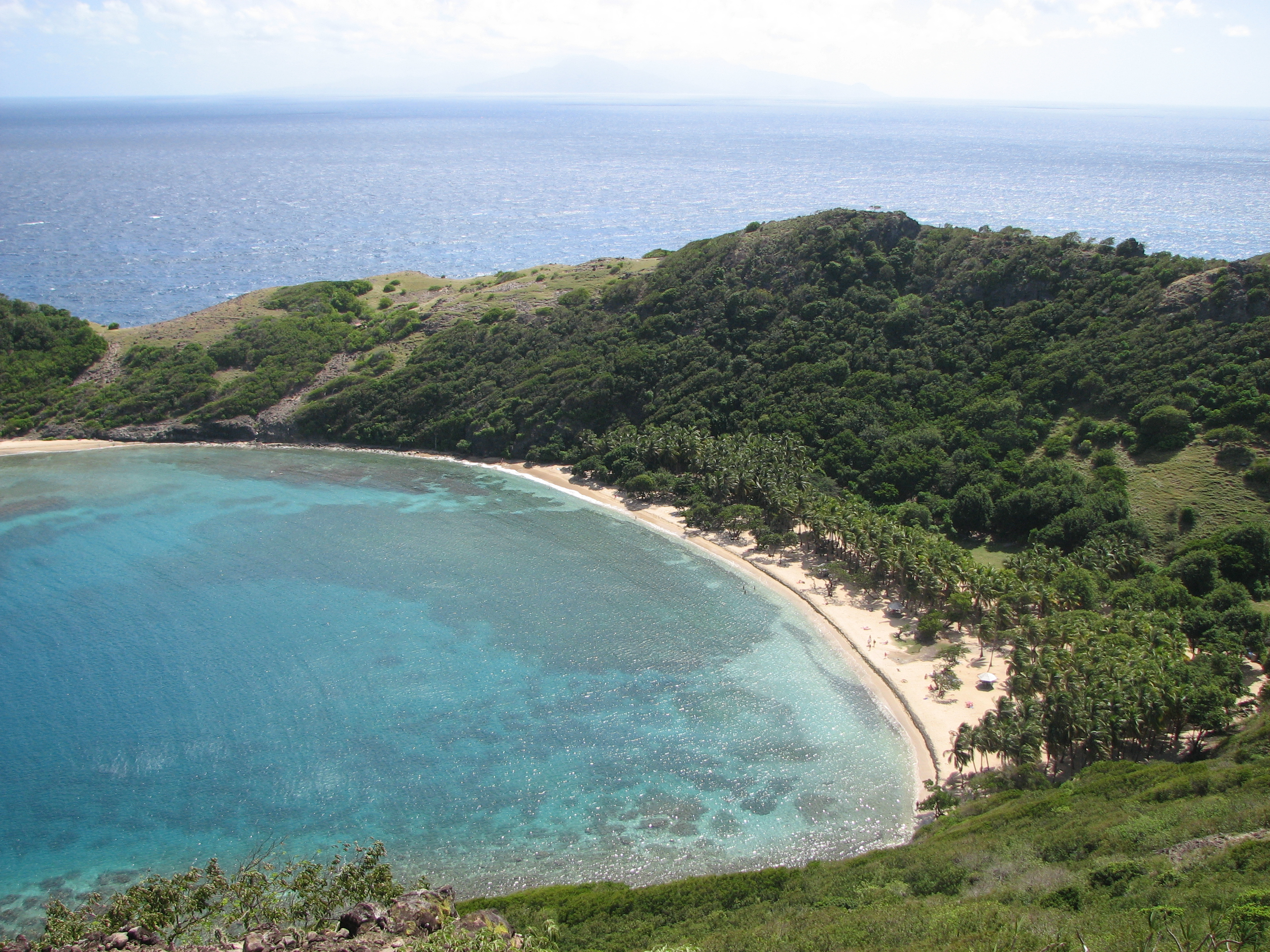
Pompierre Beach

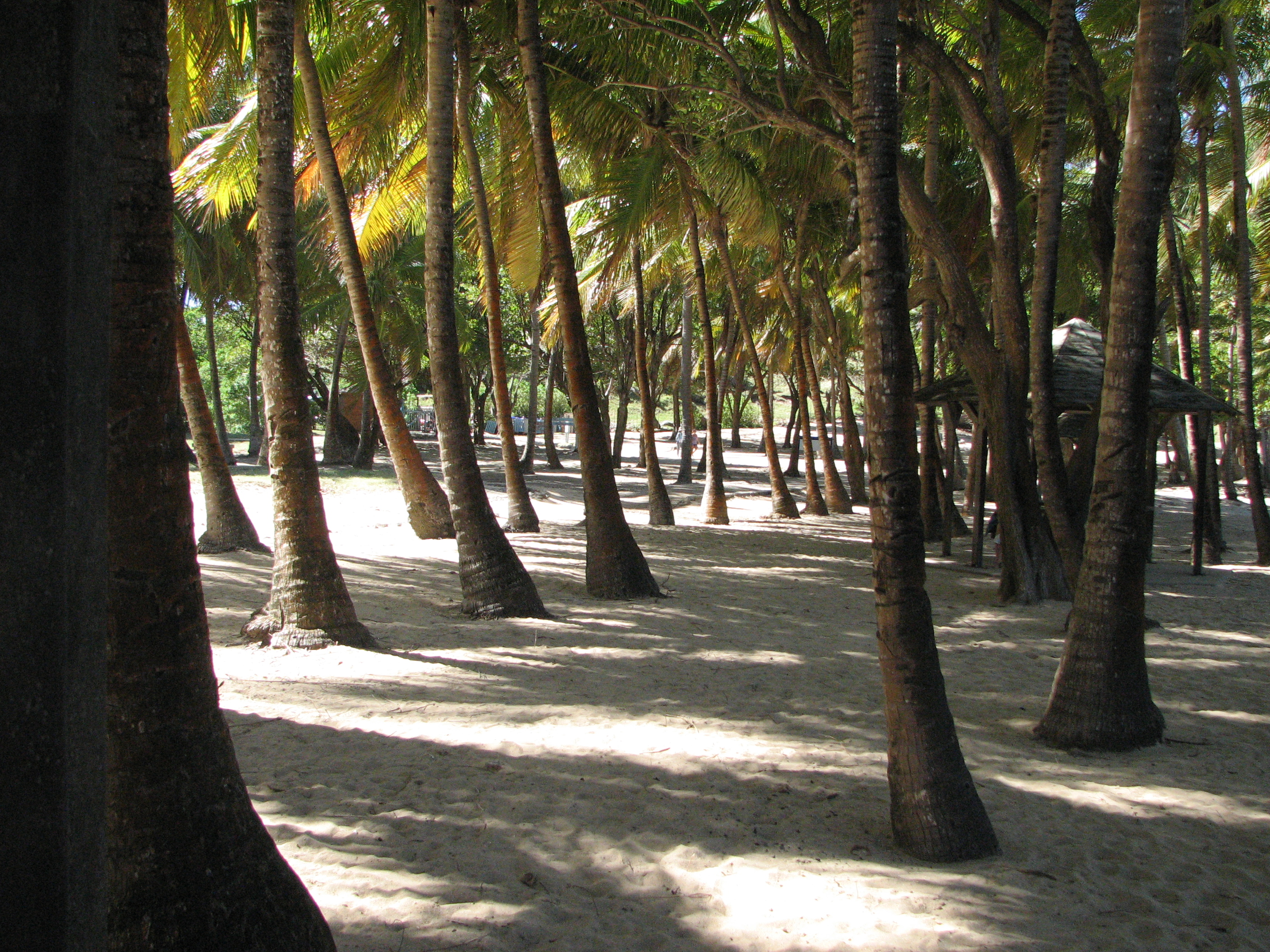
Coconut trees on Pompierre beach

The Pompierre Beach (French: plage de Pompierre, Antillean Creole: plaj Ponpiè) is a beach in Pompierre, Terre-de-Haut, one of two islands in the archipelago of the Îles des Saintes, Guadeloupe. It is 800 metres long, and overlooks Pompierre Bay on the northeast coast of the island, and is protected from the trade winds by the presence of an islet, Les Roches percées. It is the most sought after by tourists and is planted with coconut trees.

The Bay has been classified as a natural site under the terms of the so-called Law of 2 May 1930. Motor boats and sailing boats are strictly prohibited from entering or anchoring in it.
