= La Savane, Terre-de-Haut =

La Savane
- Quartier
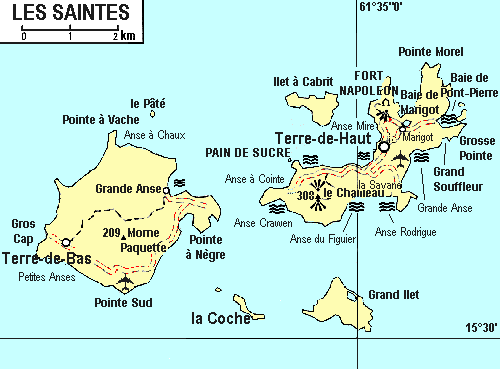
- Coordinates: 15°51′44″N 61°35′00″W
- Country: France
- Overseas department: Guadeloupe
- Canton: les Saintes
- commune: Terre-de-Haut

La Savane (French pronunciation: [la savan]) is a quartier of Terre-de-Haut Island, located in Îles des Saintes archipelago in the Caribbean. It is a residential area located in the central part of the island. It is built in the valley called Bois D'inde under the mount called Morne Caret. The hotel Les petits Saints is situated in this quartier.
