= La Savane =

La Savane may refer to:

- La Savane (Gottschalk), a piano composition by Louis Moreau Gottschalk
- La Savane (Martinique), a garden in Martinique, France
- La Savane, Terre-de-Haut, a quartier, of Terre-de-Haut, Guadeloupe, France

== See also ==
- Savane (disambiguation)
