= Notre Dame de l'Assomption, les Saintes =

Roman Catholic Church of the Îles des Saintes

Notre-Dame de l'Assomption
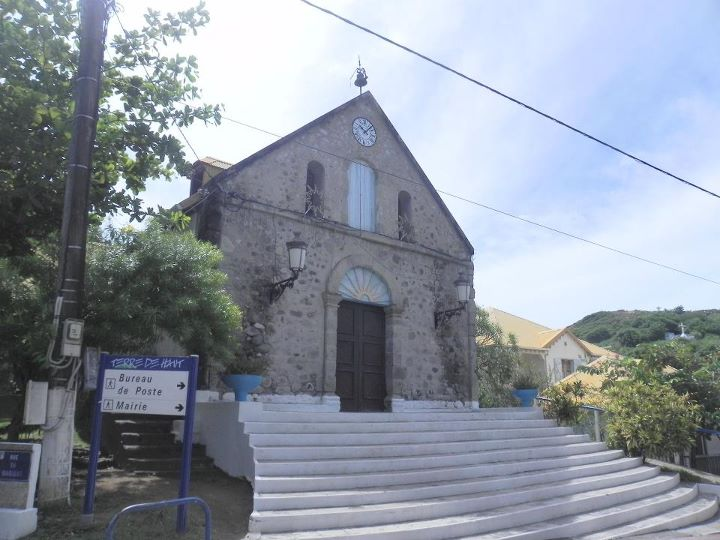
- Front of Notre-Dame de l'Assomption's church

Religion
- Affiliation: Roman Catholic
- Province: Archdiocese of Fort-de-France
- Region: Guadeloupe
- Rite: Latin Rite
- Ecclesiastical or organisational status: Church
- Status: Active

Location
- Municipality: Terre-de-Haut (Îles des Saintes)
- State: Roman Catholicism in France
- Interactive map of Notre-Dame de l'Assomption
- Territory: diocese of Basse-Terre and Pointe-à-Pître
- Coordinates: 15°52′00″N 61°34′57″W

Architecture
- Type: French Baroque
- Groundbreaking: 2nd quarter of the 19th century
- Monument historique
- Official name: Eglise Notre-Dame de l'Assomption
- Designated: 1979
- Reference no.: PA00105873
- Denomination: Église

Notre-Dame de l'Assomption (French for Our Lady of Assumption) is a Roman Catholic Church of the Îles des Saintes, an island in the archipelago of the French Overseas department of Guadeloupe. It is located in rue Jean Calot in Fond-du-Curé, a quartier (locality) of Terre-de-Haut Island. It is Latin Rite parish which is included in the diocese of Guadeloupe (Latin: Dioecesis Imae Telluris et Petrirostrensis), a suffragan of the Archdiocese of Fort-de-France, and a member of the Antilles Episcopal Conference. It is registered on the National Heritage Site of France (Monument historique) by ministerial decree of 31 December 1979.

== Origin ==
The parish was dedicated to the Virgin of the Assumption in honour of the French victory of 15 August 1666, against the English troops. Sir. du Lion established the cult and the feast day on the island in remembrance. Notre-Dame de l'Assomption became from then on the Patron saint of Terre-de-Haut.

== Bell tower ==
Four bells compose the bell tower of the church: the first one is a bell dated since 10 April 1820 which results from foundries Villain, caster in le Havre. The second is a bell offered by M. Lasserre, commissioner of Marie Maria Victoria (a monastery), melted by Astier in Nantes in 1884. The third bell was melted for the parish under Charles FOY's mandature, Mayor of Terre-de-Haut and Abbé (Abbot) Ruffin, Priest of the parish. it was melted by Ferdinand Farnier, in Robecourt (Vosges) and baptized Maria Antonia. The fourth and last bell was installed on 23 April 2006 and baptized by Ernest Cabo, Bishop of Guadeloupe. It was offered by the municipality at the end of the rebuilding of the bell tower destroyed by the 2004 Les Saintes earthquake.

== See also ==
- Roman Catholic Marian churches
- Assumption of Mary
- History of les Saintes
