= Mouillage, Terre-de-Haut =

Mouillage
- Quartier
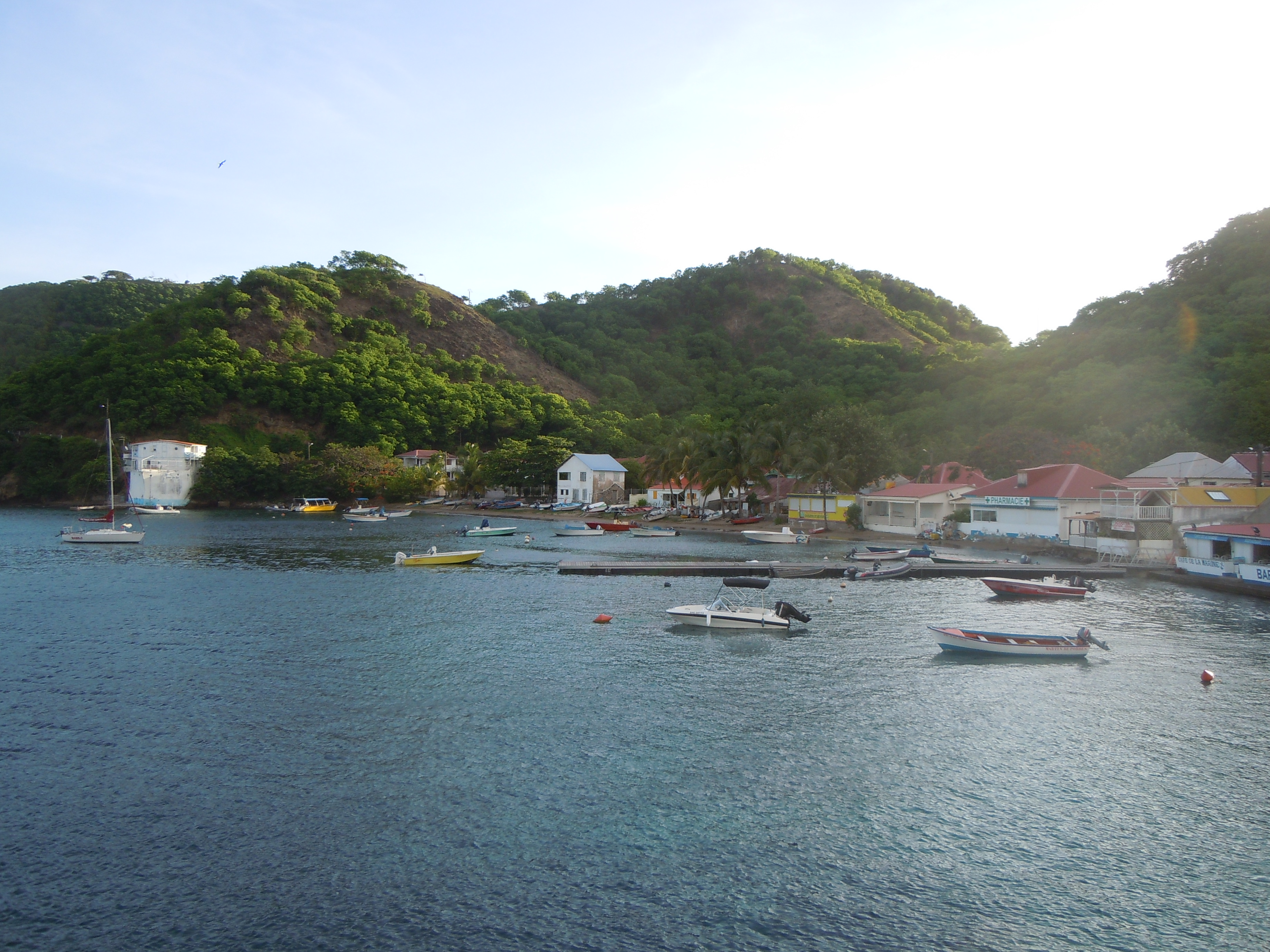

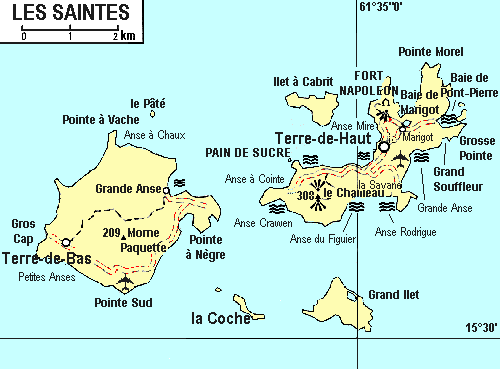
- Coordinates: 15°52′08″N 61°34′54″W
- Country: France
- Overseas department: Guadeloupe
- Canton: les Saintes
- commune: Terre-de-Haut

Mouillage (French pronunciation: [mujaʒ]) is a quartier of Terre-de-Haut Island, located in Îles des Saintes archipelago in the Caribbean. It is located in the central part of the island. This is the oldest village of Terre-de-Haut Island. It is a natural harbour. The main port of the archipelago is located at this place. The ancient Gendarmerie Nationale office was in that village. Today it became the tourism office of the archipelago. The primary school is situated on Jean Calo road and the nursery school on la Marine road of this village.

== To See ==
- The "Bateau des îles" or the house in the shape of bow of ship: This is a famous house similar to a bow of cruise ship integrated into the hill. It was built in 1942 by Adolphe Catan. Today it is where live the doctor of the island.
- The square of Gouverneur Lion: The main place located on the port. It is a lively place with colored creole houses, bar-lounges, shops, souvenirs. There is lot of tourists because of the port and the cruise and yacht landing stage.
