= Morne à Craie =

Coordinates: 15°51′34″N 61°35′04″W

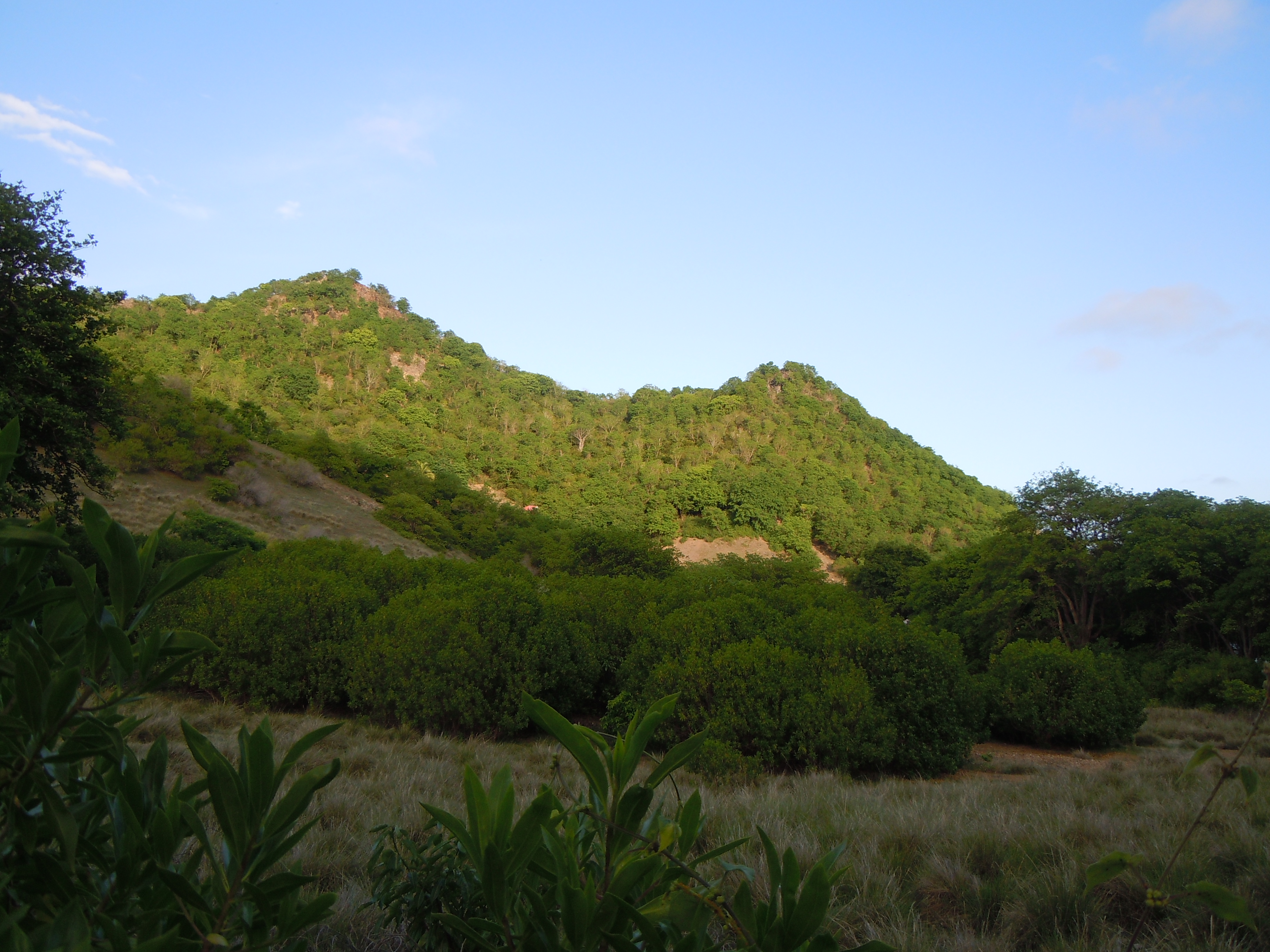
Morne à Craie

Morne à Craie is a mountain on the island of Terre-de-Haut in the archipelago of the Îles des Saintes in Guadeloupe. It has an altitude of 148 metres (486 ft). The south side of the mountain is a classified natural area of ecological interest for its flora and fauna, and was acquired in 2003 by the Conservatoire du Littoral.
