= Terre-de-Haut Island =

Island in Guadeloupe

Terre-de-Haut
Native name: Terre-de-Haut des Saintes
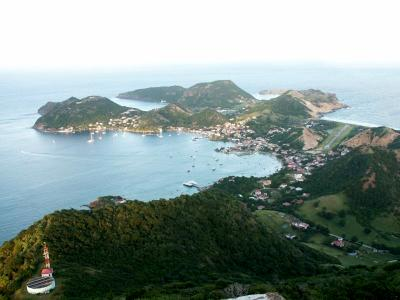
- Terre-de-Haut view from Chameau hill.

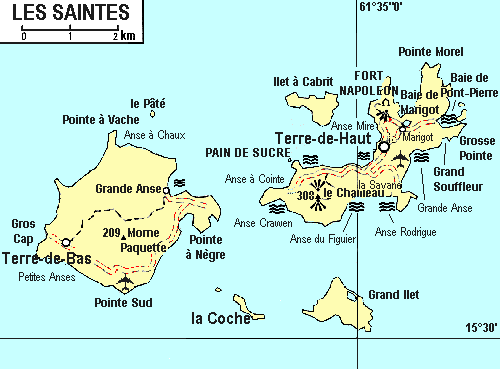
- Terre-de-Haut Island on the right

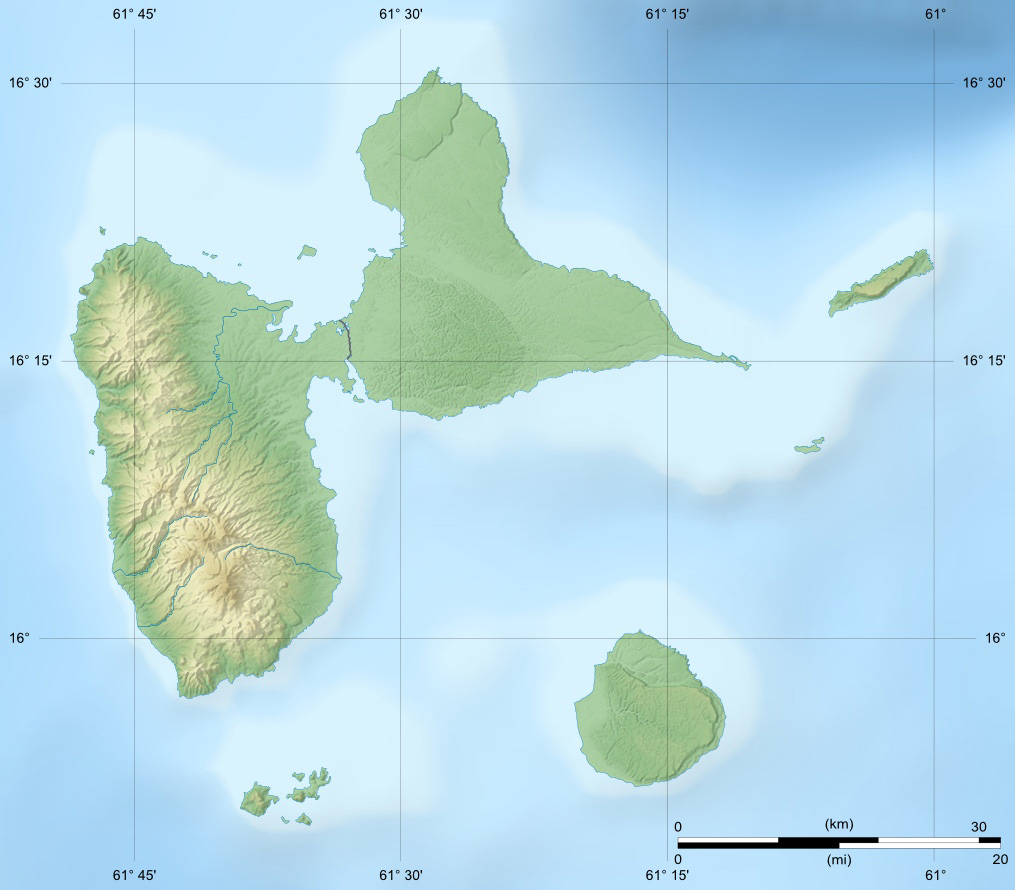
- Location within Guadeloupe Location within Lesser Antilles Location within the Caribbean

Geography
- Location: Caribbean Sea
- Coordinates: 15°51′45″N 61°35′00″W
- Archipelago: Îles des Saintes
- Area: 5.2 km^{2} (2.0 sq mi)
- Highest elevation: 306 m (1004 ft)
- Highest point: Chameau hill

Administration
- France
- Overseas department: Guadeloupe
- Canton: Trois-Rivières
- commune: Terre-de-Haut
- Capital city: Fond-du-Curé
- Largest settlement: Fond-du-Curé
- Mayor: Louis Molinié

Demographics
- Population: 1532 (2017)
- Pop. density: 255/km^{2} (660/sq mi)

Additional information
- IUCN category IV (habitat/species management area)
- Area: 3.51 km^{2} (1.36 sq mi)
- Established: 1991
- Website: Terre-de-Haut in Guadeloupe

Terre-de-Haut Island (French pronunciation: [tɛʁ də ʔo]; Guadeloupean Creole: Tèdého; also formerly known as Petite Martinique) is the easternmost island in the Îles des Saintes, part of the archipelago of Guadeloupe. Like name of neighboring Terre-de-Bas Island, name Terre-de-Haut comes from the maritime vocabulary, which called the islands exposed to the "highland" winds and those protected from the wind, "lowlands".

== Geography ==
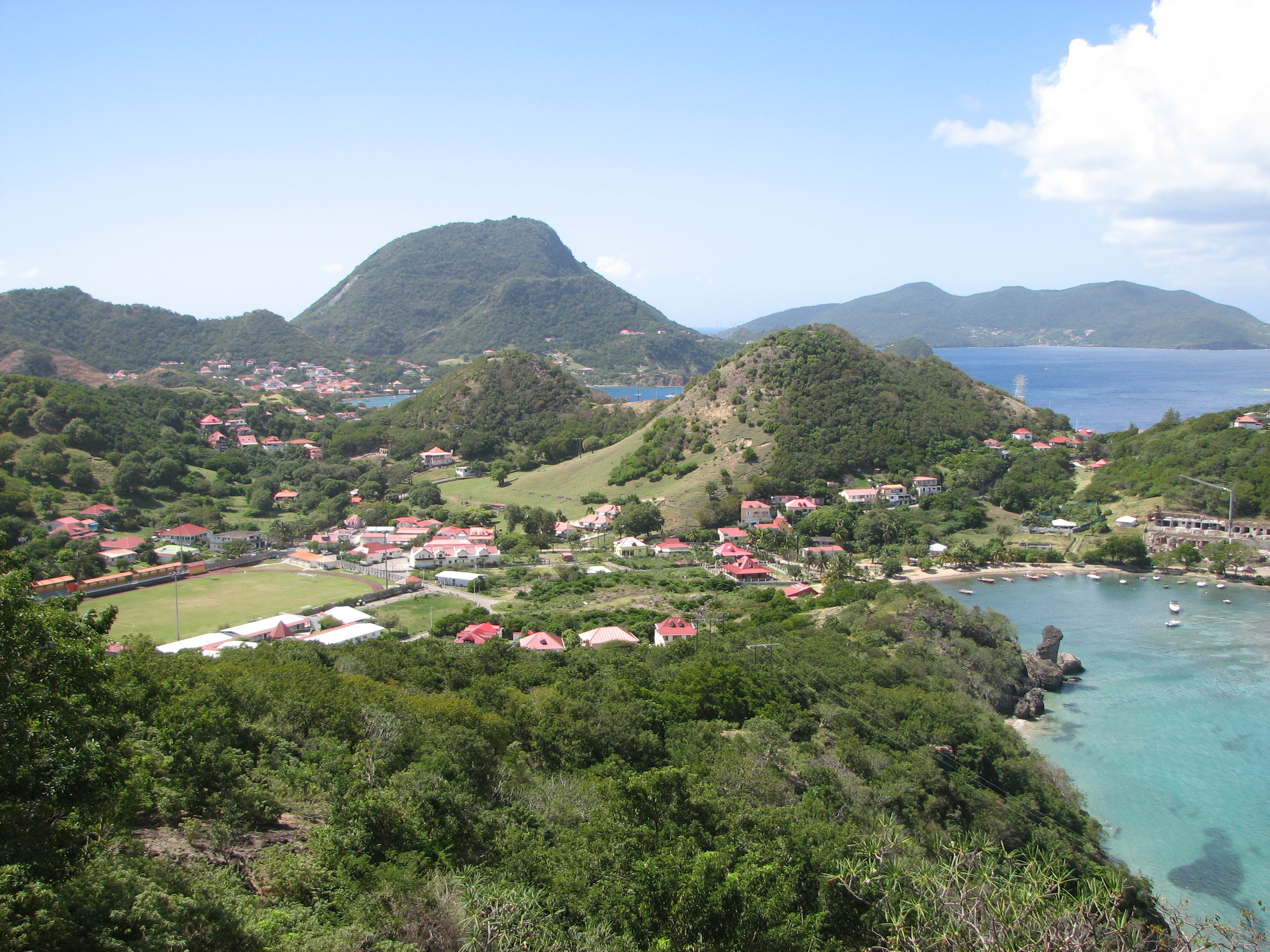
Chameau hill

Terre-de-Haut is separated from Terre-de-Bas by a narrow channel of 890 m (0.55 mi). Besides Terre-de-Bas, several small islands surround Terre-de-Haut. It is an island of 5.2 km^{2} (2.0 sq mi) dominated in the north by Morne Mire hill (107 metres (351 ft)) and Morel hill (136 metres (446 ft)).

Morel is on the North of the island, between the bay of Marigot and the bay of Pompierre. There is an ancient fortress there, Caroline battery.

The Chameau 306 metres (1,004 ft), in the southwest, is the highest elevation in the archipelago. It is covered with forest. On the summit, there is a watchtower, called La tour modèle. Chameau is the property of the Conservatoire du littoral and is a protected site category IV IUCN.

== History ==
The first recorded European colonizer was Christopher Columbus in November 1493.

The First colonists arrived in 1648. In 1666, the church Notre Dame de l'Assomption was built.

The strategic position of Petite Martinique (its former name) was important. In August 1666 French victory over the British ensured French sovereignty over these islands. However, from 1759 to 1815, alternations of British and French Dominions. In 1777 France built the defensive system Fort Napoléon des Saintes. In April 1782 the Battle of the Saintes. The British, who occupied les Saintes in 1809, kept Fort Joséphine and added water butt to it.

From the later French dominion it became a penitentiary from 1851, but it was ravaged by a hurricane in 1865. It continued however to welcome convicts on the way towards Îles du Salut, in French Guiana until 1902.

In 1871, Îlet à Cabrit became a place of quarantine: a lazaretto, was opened instead of the penitentiary.

The local vocabulary says: "to go up" to move towards the windward quartier (to Fort Napoléon) and "to go down" to move towards the leeward quartier (to Pain-de-sucre).

== Demographics ==
The low quantitative precipitation forecast do not allow the establishment of agriculture. Few slaves were brought onto these islands. The population is constituted historically by Bretons, Normans and by inhabitants of Poitou who came to fish.

In 2017 the population of Terre-de-Haut was 1,532, with a density of population of 255 inhabitants/km2. The number of households was 676.

=== Populated areas ===
The oldest settlements are the villages of Mouillage and Fond-du curé. The population is spread among 20 quartiers, grouped into two halves:

Au vent (Windward)		Sous le Vent (Leeward)	
Nr	Quartier	Nr	Quartier
1; 2; 3; 4; 5; 6; 7; 8; 9; 10	Pompierre; Marigot; Vieille-Anse; Fort Napoléon; Maison blanche La Coulée; Coquelet; Anse-Mire; Mouillage; Grande-Anse	11; 12; 13; 14; 15; 16; 17; 18; 19; 20	Fond-du-Curé la Savane; Anse Rodrigue; Anse Galet; Prés Cassin la Convalescence; Anse Figuier; Pain de sucre Anse à Cointe; Anse Crawen

== See also ==
- Fort Napoléon des Saintes
- Dependencies of Guadeloupe

== Gallery ==
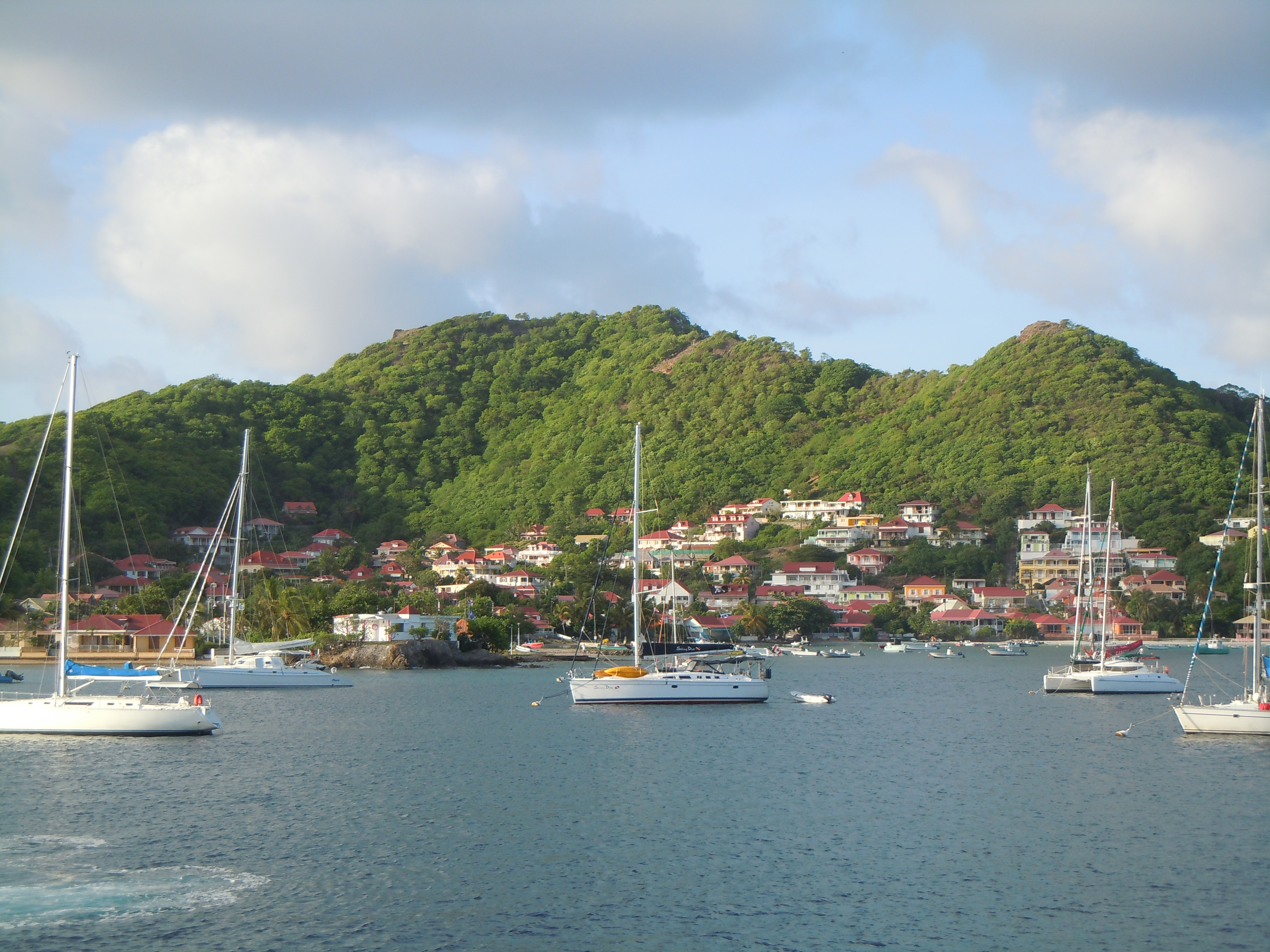
Fond-du-Curé, les Saintes

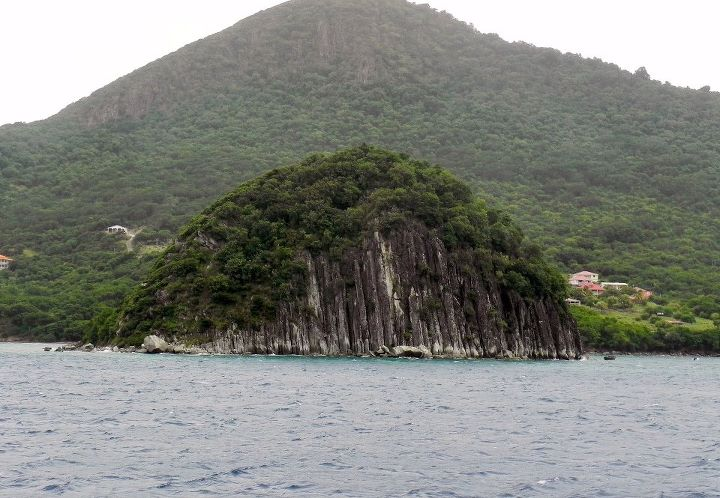
Pain de sucre

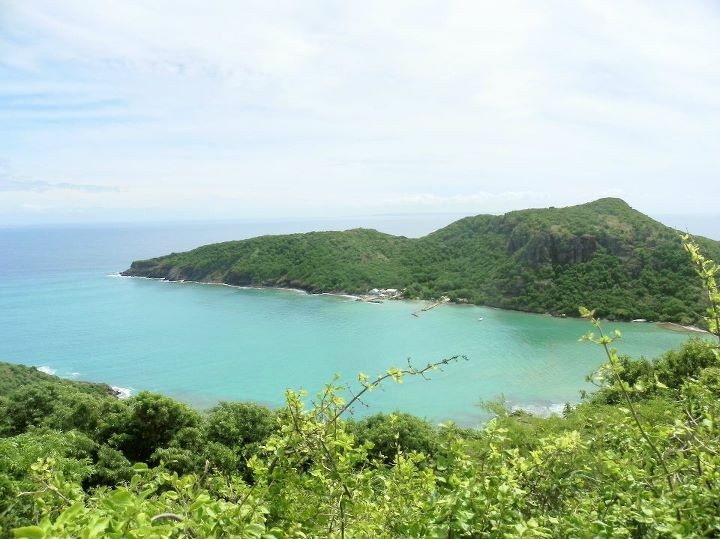
Morel hill viewed from Fort Napoléon
