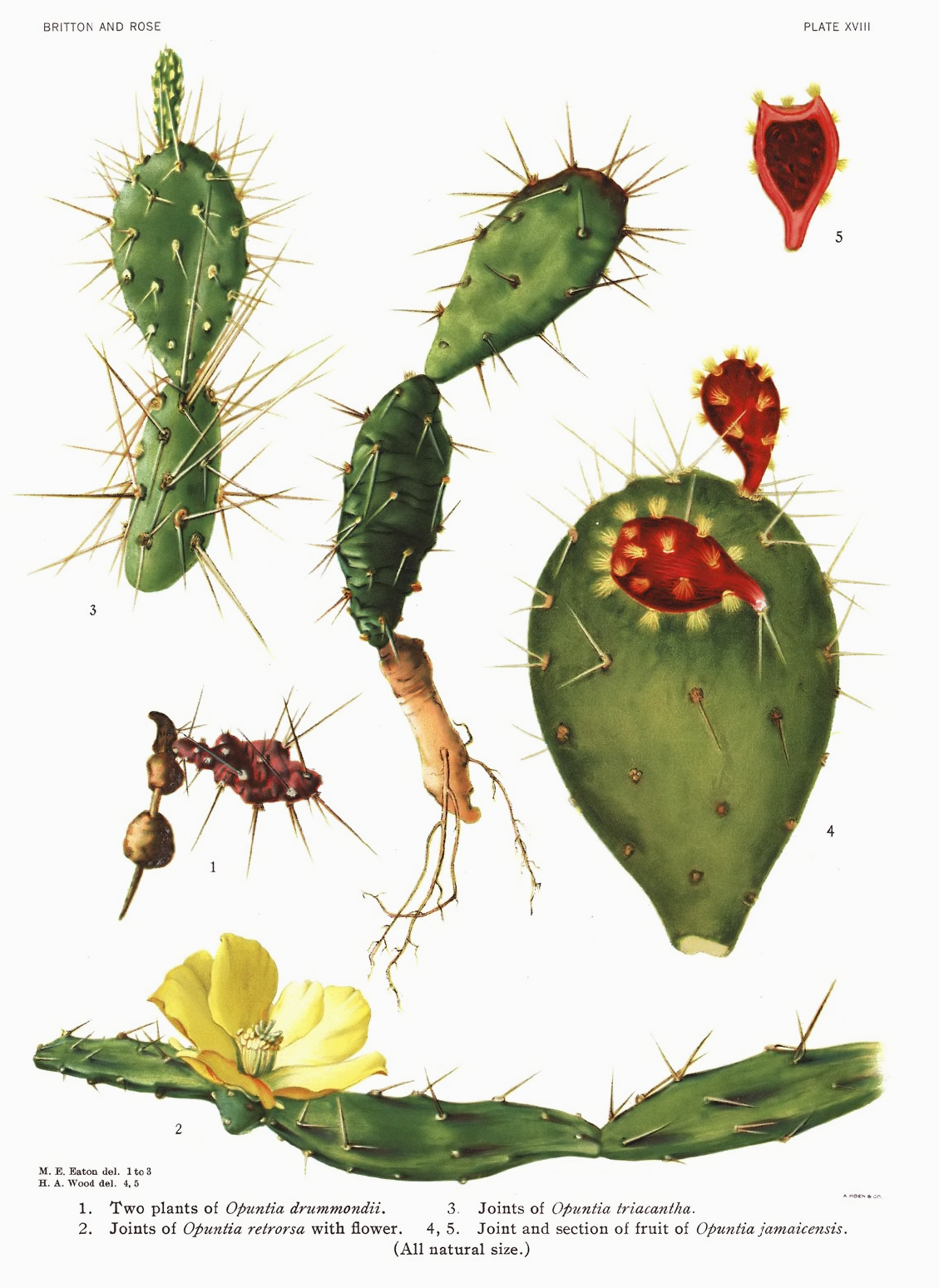
- Opuntia filtered

Conservation status
- Near Threatened (IUCN 3.1)

Scientific classification
- Kingdom: Plantae
- Clade: Tracheophytes
- Clade: Angiosperms
- Clade: Eudicots
- Order: Caryophyllales
- Family: Cactaceae
- Genus: Opuntia
- Species: O. triacantha

Binomial name
- Opuntia triacantha (Willd.) Sweet

= Opuntia triacantha =

Species of cactus

Opuntia triacantha is a species of cactus known by the common names Spanish lady, Keys Joe-jumper, Big Pine Key prickly-pear, and jumping prickly apple.

== Description ==
This cactus grows prostrate or upright to a maximum length of 60 centimeters. The stem segments are flattened and oval in shape, up to 18 centimeters long by 7 wide. The black-tipped spines are up to 4 centimeters long. The cactus produces yellow flowers year-round. The fleshy red fruit is up to 3 centimeters long by 2 wide.

== Distribution and habitat ==
The plant is native to the Caribbean, from Desecheo Island, Puerto Rico, to the Lesser Antilles. It grows on the sandy limestone of exposed reefs.

== Conservation ==
This species is threatened by the cactus moth (Cactoblastis cactorum).
