= Fort Napoléon des Saintes =

Museum and former fort in Guadeloupe

Coordinates: 15°52′30″N 61°34′57″W

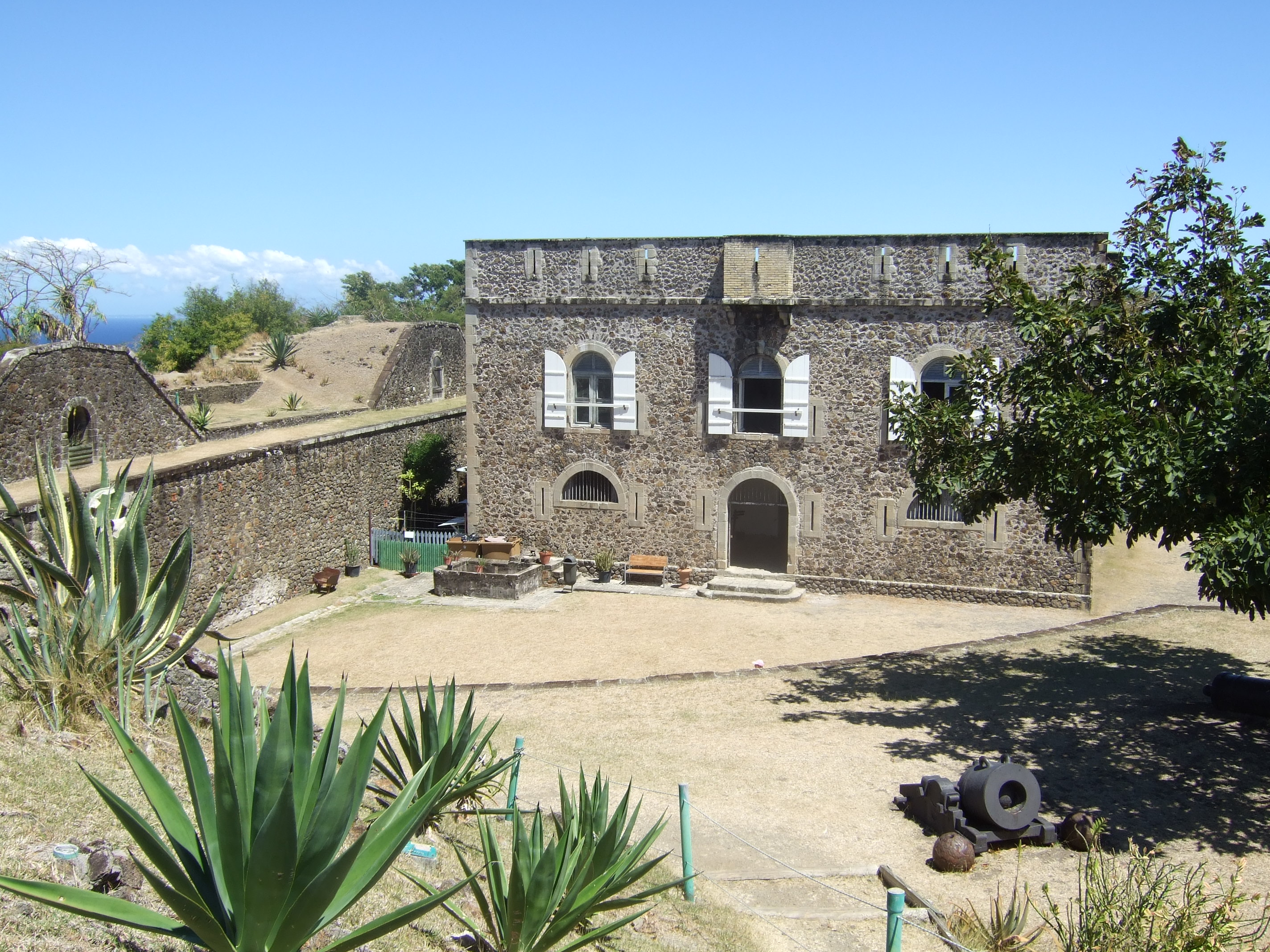
Fort Napoléon des Saintes

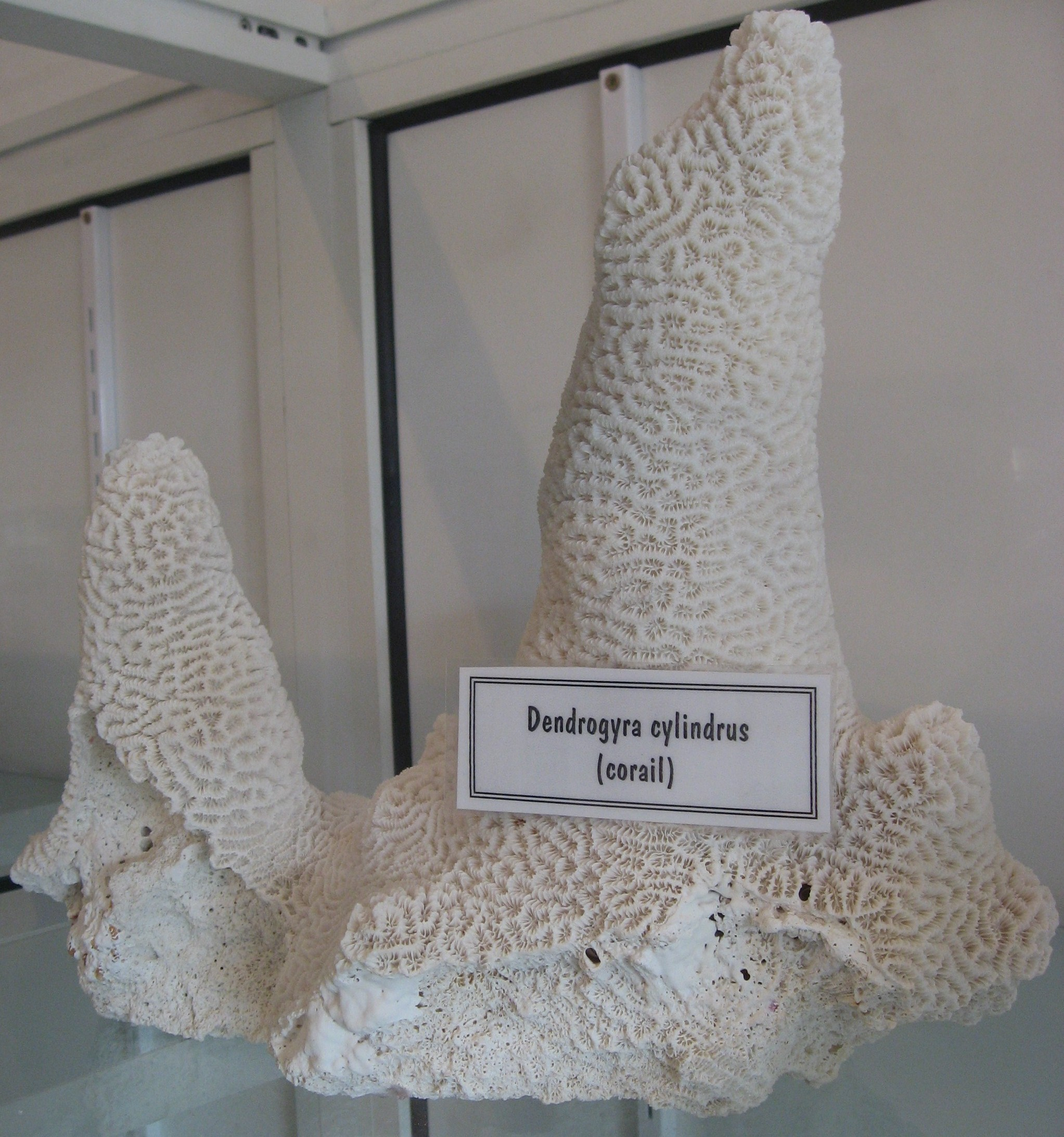
Display featuring Dendrogyra cylindrus at the Fort Napoléon museum.

Fort Napoléon (in French: Fort Napoléon des Saintes) is a fortification, located on Terre-de-Haut Island, in the Îles des Saintes, Guadeloupe. Property of the Departmental Council of Guadeloupe, it has been classified as a historical monument since the December 15, 1997. Fort Napoléon was built on the morne (Caribbean French word for "bluff") called Mire, it was originally named Fort Louis.

== History ==
From 1759 to 1763, the English took possession of Saintes and part of mainland Guadeloupe. The archipelago was returned to the Kingdom of France upon signing of the Treaty of Paris on February 10, 1763.

A fort, named Fort Louis, was built between 1777 and 1779 on the Mire to 119 m above sea level. This rectangular structure was protected by an earthen mortar masonry enclosure. It had barracks for 45 men and two tanks collecting rainwater. Its armament consisted of two cannons and three mortars intended to protect the Whale Pass and the Terre-de-Haut roadstead. It was renamed after Napoleon III, in 1805, and was destroyed by British forces in 1809.

After the Treaty of Paris of 1814 and the restitution of Guadeloupe in French jurisdiction, Fort Napoléon was rebuilt on the ruins of the fort by erecting high surrounding walls and setting up a powder magazine. The works took place from 1816 to 1840. The Fortifications Committee of the Ministry of the Navy and Colonies in 1842 decided to build a real bastioned fortification, because of a system offering better defensive assets. It was completed in 1867 but never saw use in battle, and was instead used as a penitentiary.

It has now been turned into a museum dedicated to the Saintes’ history, culture, and environment. It also has contains the Jardin exotique du Fort Napoléon, a botanical garden dedicated to local succulent plants and iguanas.

== See also ==
- History of France
- French West Indies
