= Canton of Les Saintes =

Coordinates: 15°51′30″N 61°36′28″W

Les Saintes
- Former canton
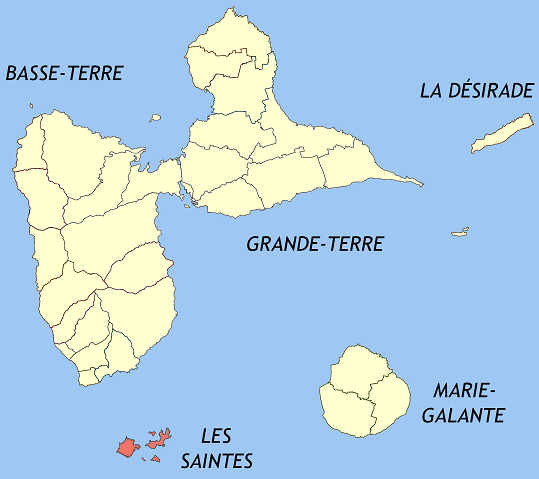
- Country: France
- Overseas region and department: Guadeloupe{{{region}}}
- No. of communes: {{{nbcomm}}}
- Disbanded: 2015
- Area: 14 km^{2} (5.4 sq mi)
- Population (2012): 2,882
  - Density: 210/km^{2} (530/sq mi)

The Canton of Les Saintes is a former canton in the Arrondissement of Basse-Terre in the department of Guadeloupe. It had 2,882 inhabitants (2012). It was disbanded following the French canton reorganisation which came into effect in March 2015. It consisted of 2 communes, which joined the canton of Trois-Rivières in 2015.

== Municipalities ==
The canton included 2 communes:

- Terre-de-Haut
- Terre-de-Bas

== See also ==
- Cantons of Guadeloupe
- Communes of Guadeloupe
- Arrondissements of Guadeloupe
