= Terre-de-Haut =

- Commune
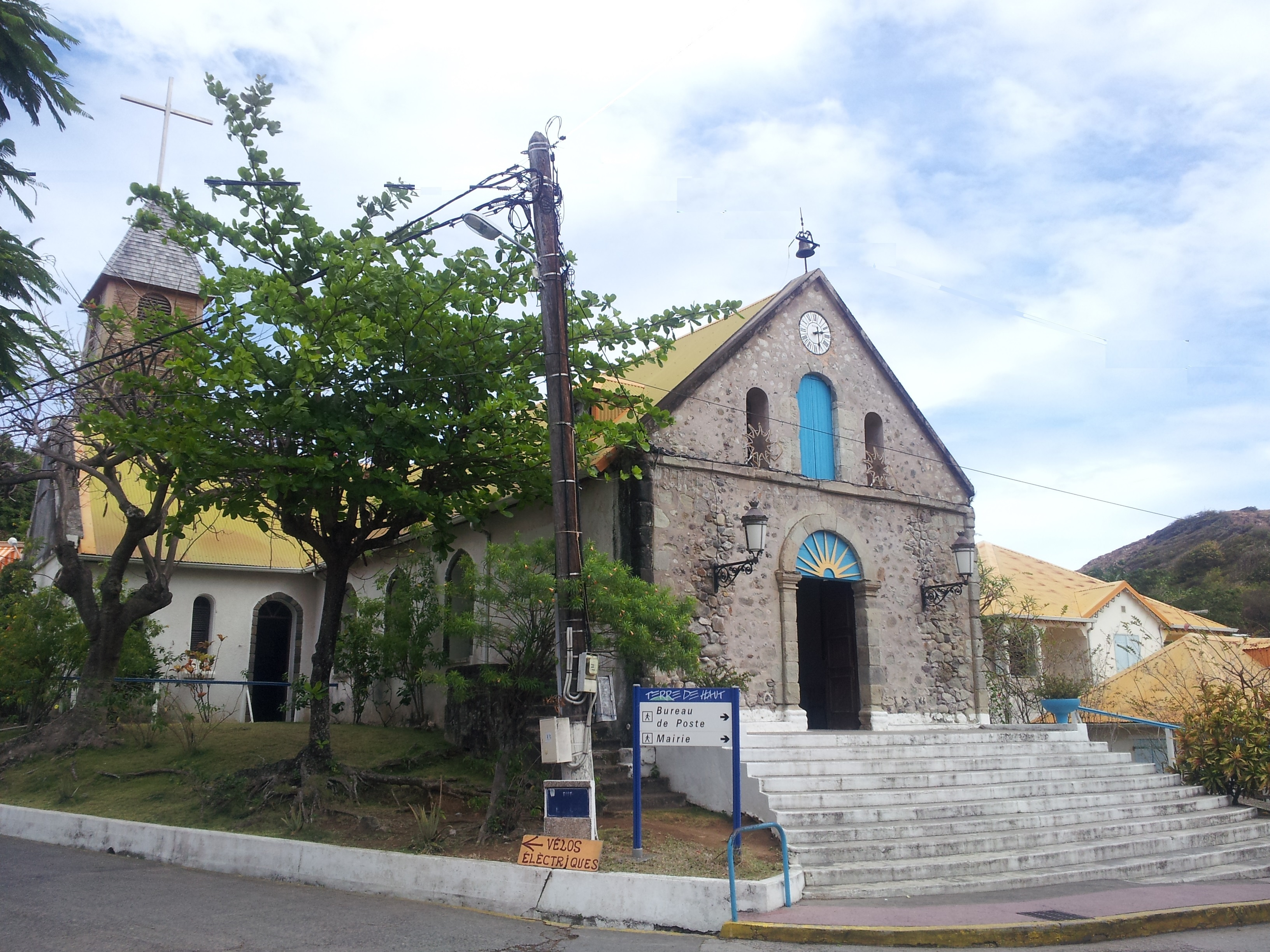
- The church of Terre-de-Haut

- Coat of arms

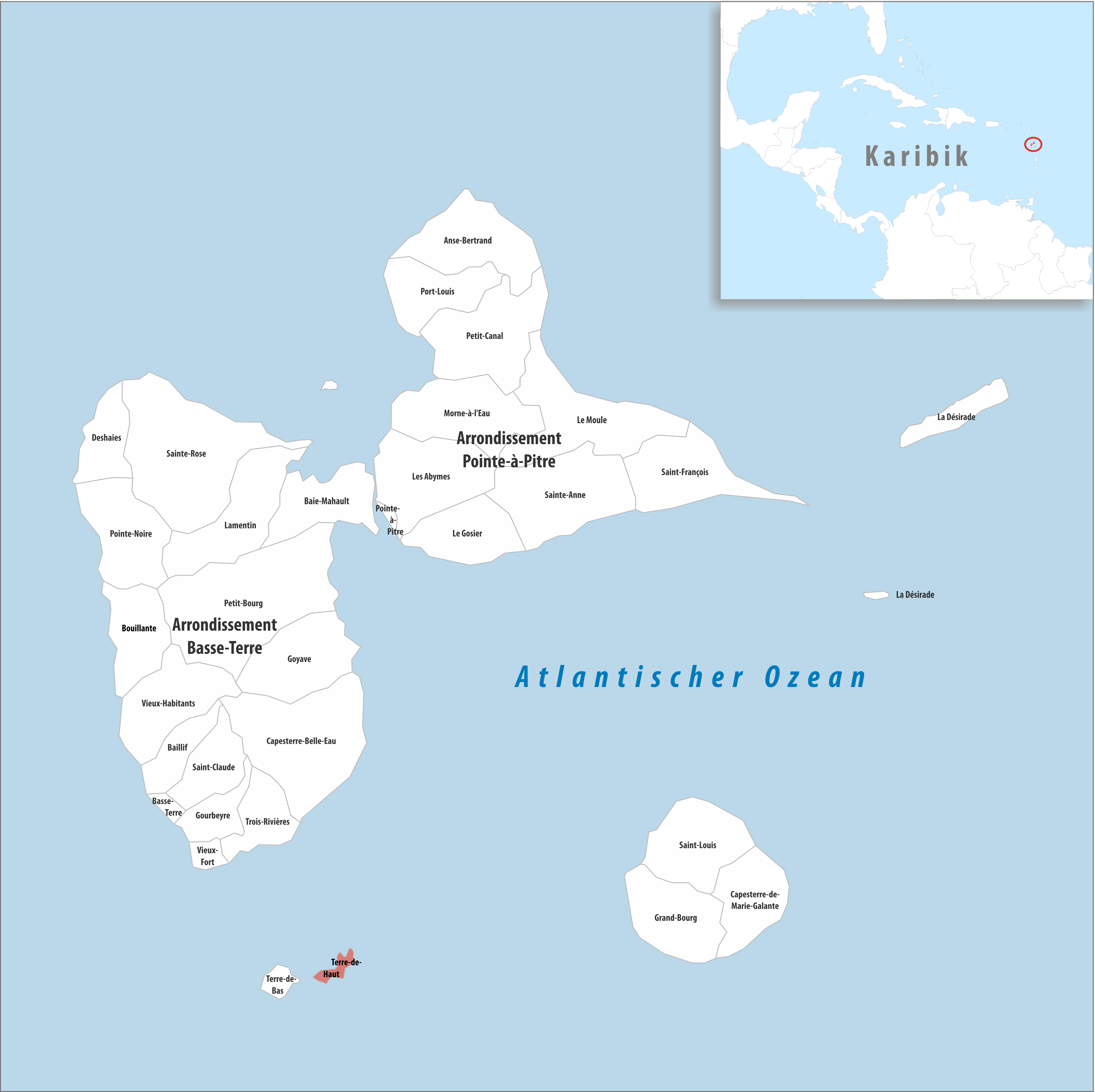
- Location of the commune (in red) within Guadeloupe
- Location of Terre-de-Haut
- Coordinates: 15°52′00″N 61°35′00″W
- Country: France
- Overseas region and department: Guadeloupe
- Arrondissement: Basse-Terre
- Canton: Trois-Rivières
- Intercommunality: CA Grand Sud Caraïbe

Government
  - Mayor (2023–2026): Louly Bonbon
- Area^{1}: 6.00 km^{2} (2.32 sq mi)
- Highest elevation: 306 m (1,004 ft)
- Lowest elevation: 0 m (0 ft)
- Population (2023): 1,463
  - Density: 244/km^{2} (632/sq mi)
- Time zone: UTC−04:00 (AST)
- INSEE/Postal code: 97131 /97137
- ^{1} French Land Register data, which excludes lakes, ponds, glaciers > 1 km^{2} (0.386 sq mi or 247 acres) and river estuaries.

Terre-de-Haut (French pronunciation: [tɛʁ də ʔo]; Guadeloupean Creole: Tèdého) is a commune in the French overseas department of Guadeloupe, including Terre-de-Haut Island and a few other small uninhabited islands of the archipelago (les Roches Percées; Îlet à Cabrit; Grand-Îlet; la Redonde). It is the most populous island of the archipelago of Les Saintes. The Fort Napoléon is located in this commune.

== Tourism ==
Terre-de-Haut is the most tourist-friendly municipality in les Saintes archipelago, with hotels, bungalows, bars and restaurants. There is little formalized activity, but one can tour the restored Fort Napoleon or rent mopeds. Located there is the beautiful Plage de Pompierre beach, as well as small guest-houses, eateries, French-Creole shops, and an active harbour where ferries passengers from Guadeloupe arrive. The local people make a living from fishing and from tourism. Visitors are free to explore without modern-day intrusion. The local currency is the Euro, but credit cards are easily accepted. A small airport was built on the island in 1973 to welcome private planes from Guadeloupe and other nearby Caribbean islands.

== History ==
List of the successive mayors
| Period | Identity | Party | Quality |
|---|---|---|---|
| 2023– | Louly Bonbon | | |
| 2020–2023 | Hilaire Brudey | Parti socialiste | |
| 2018–2020 | Louly Bonbon | DVD | |
| 2000–2018 | Louis Molinié | UMP | |
| 1977–2000 | Robert Joyeux | RPR | |
| 1971–1977 | René Germain | | |
| 1961–1971 | Eugène Samson | | |
| 1957–1961 | Georges Azincourt | | |
| 1936–1957 | Théodore Samson | | |
| 1929–1935 | Benoît Cassin | | |
| 1915–1928 | Emmanuel Laurent | | |
| 1911–1914 | Paul-Eugène Thomas | | |
| 1902–1908 | Benoit Cassin | | |
| 1892–1902 | Charles Foy | | |
| 1884–1892 | Bernard Azincourt | | |
| 1882–1884 | Charles Foy | | First mayor of Terre-de-Haut |
| 1871–1882 | Jean-Pierre Lognos | | Last mayor of les Saintes |
The previous data are not mentioned yet.

== Demographics ==
Historical population
| Year | Pop. | ±% p.a. |
|---|---|---|
| 1967 | 1,474 | — |
| 1974 | 1,453 | −0.20% |
| 1982 | 1,474 | +0.18% |
| 1990 | 1,527 | +0.44% |
| 1999 | 1,729 | +1.39% |
| 2007 | 1,854 | +0.88% |
| 2012 | 1,773 | −0.89% |
| 2017 | 1,532 | −2.88% |
| 2023 | 1,463 | −0.77% |
Source: INSEE

== Points of interest ==
- Fort Napoléon des Saintes
- Jardin exotique du Fort Napoléon

== Education ==
Public preschools and primary schools:

- Ecole primaire Bourg Terre-de-Haut
- Ecole maternelle Bourg Terre-de-Haut

== See also ==
- Communes of the Guadeloupe department
