= List of amphibians and reptiles of Saint Kitts and Nevis =

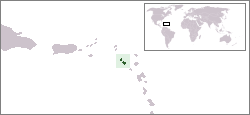
Location of Saint Kitts and Nevis in the Caribbean.

This is a list of amphibians and reptiles found on the islands of Saint Kitts and Nevis, a two-island nation in the Caribbean Lesser Antilles. The islands are separated by a narrow strait that is only 3.2 km wide and 15 m deep, and thus the two islands have very similar faunas.

== Amphibians ==
There are two species of amphibian recorded on Saint Kitts and Nevis.

=== Frogs (Anura) ===
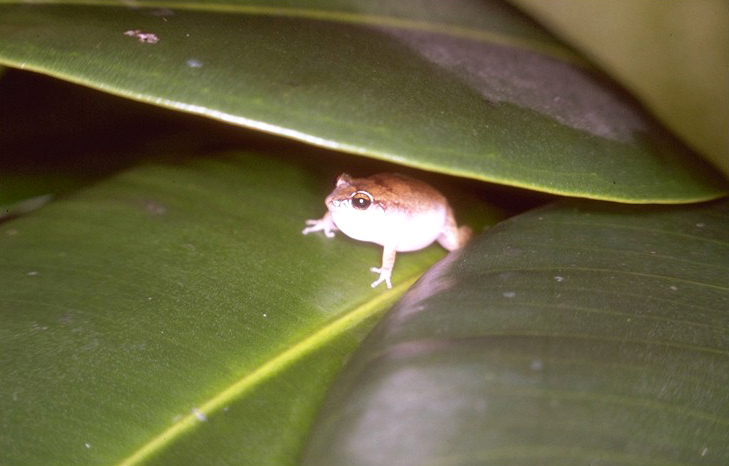
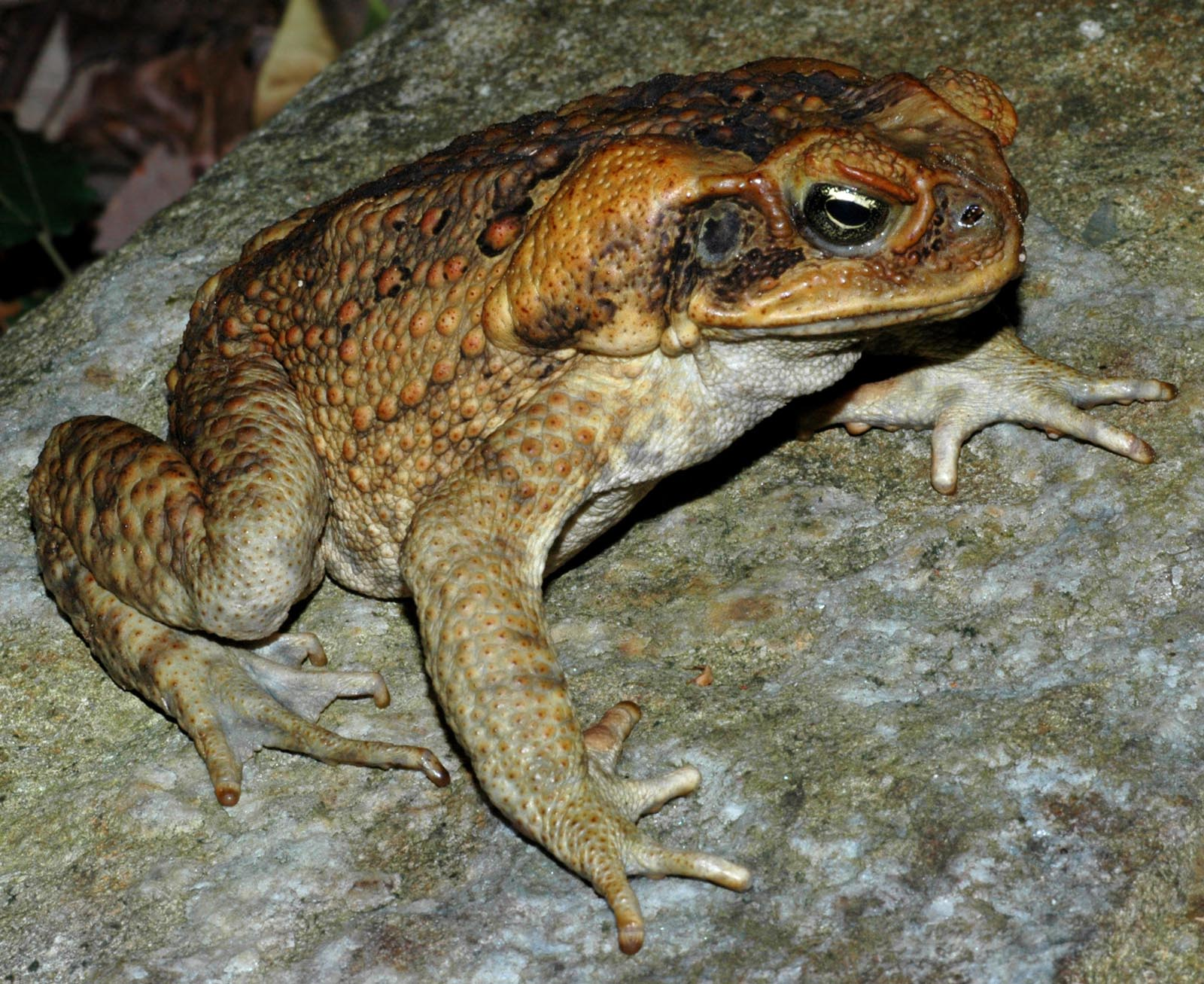
Tropical frogs (Leptodactylidae)
Species	Common name(s)	Notes	Image
Eleutherodactylus johnstonei	Lesser Antillean Whistling Frog, Coqui Antillano, Johnstone's Whistling Frog	Least Concern.
True toads (Bufonidae)
Species	Common name(s)	Notes	Image
Bufo marinus	Cane Toad, Giant Neotropical Toad, Marine Toad	Least Concern. Introduced.

== Reptiles ==
Including marine turtles and introduced species, there are 14 reptile species reported on Saint Kitts and 12 species on Nevis.

=== Turtles (Testudines) ===
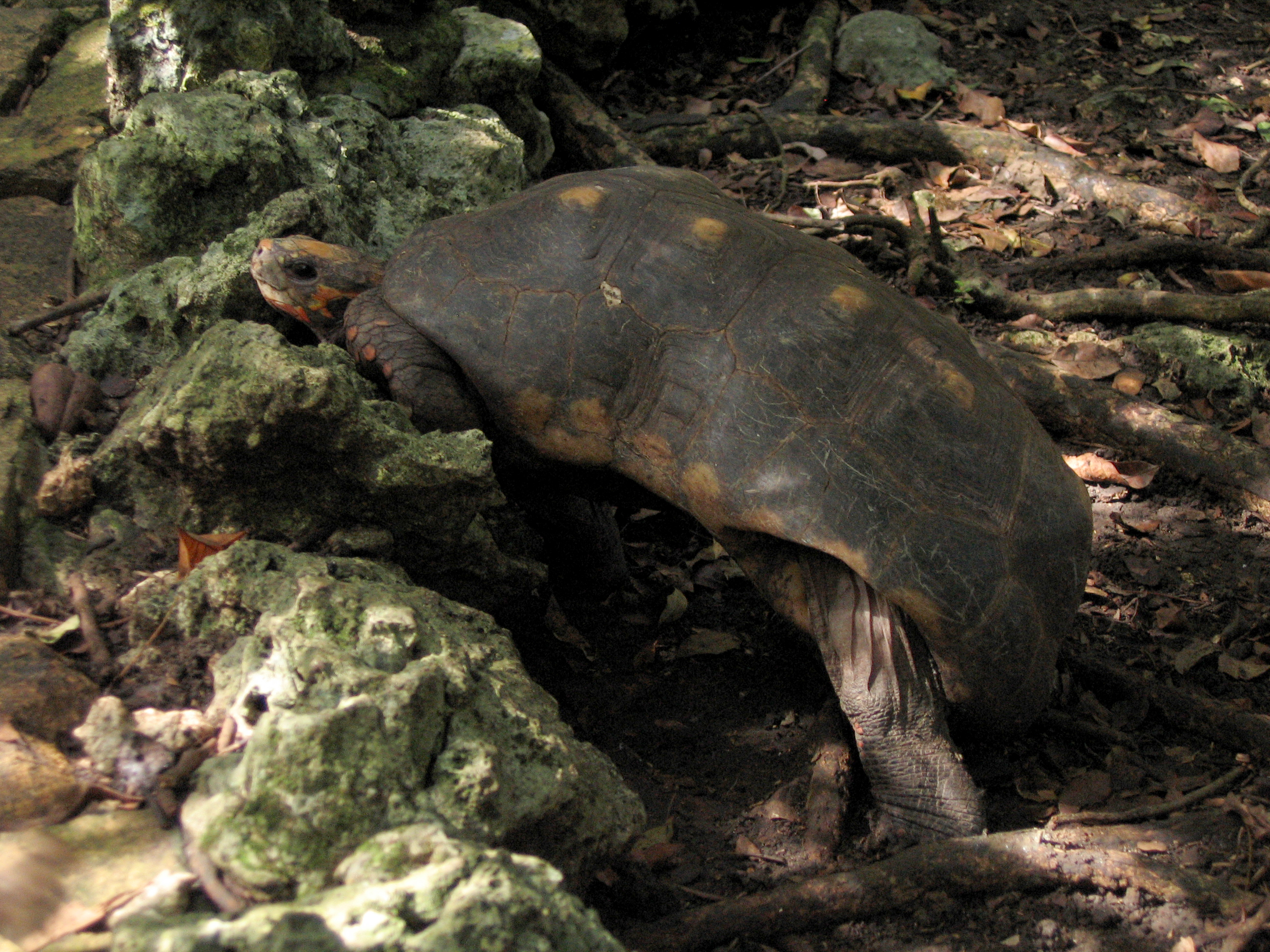
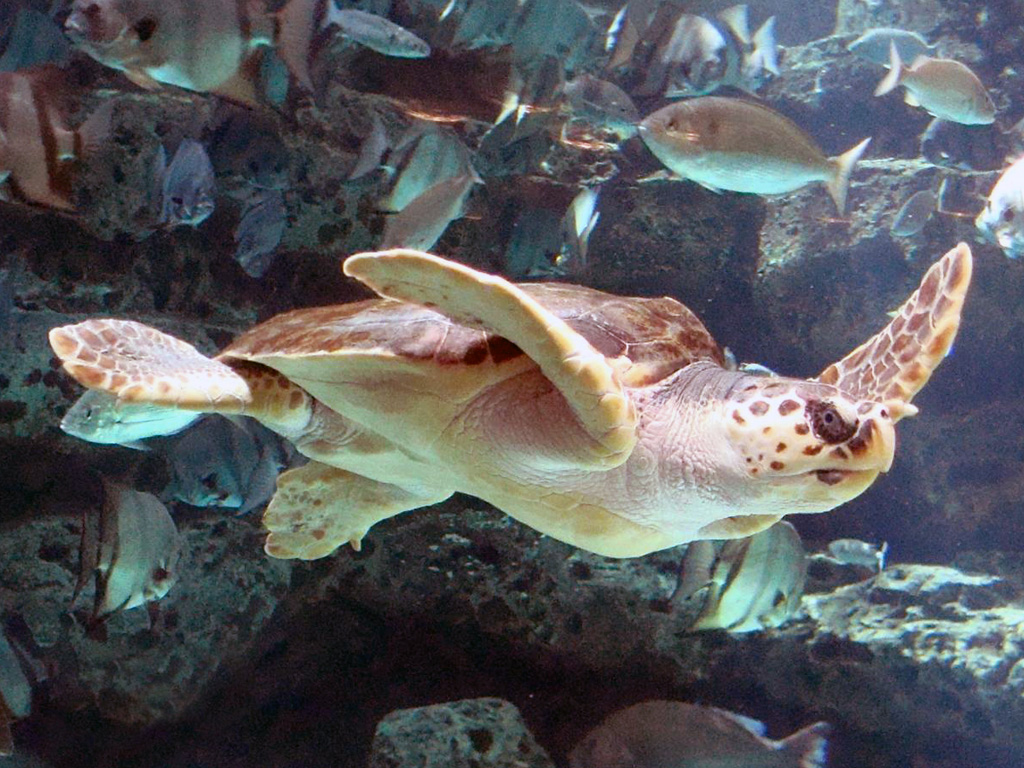
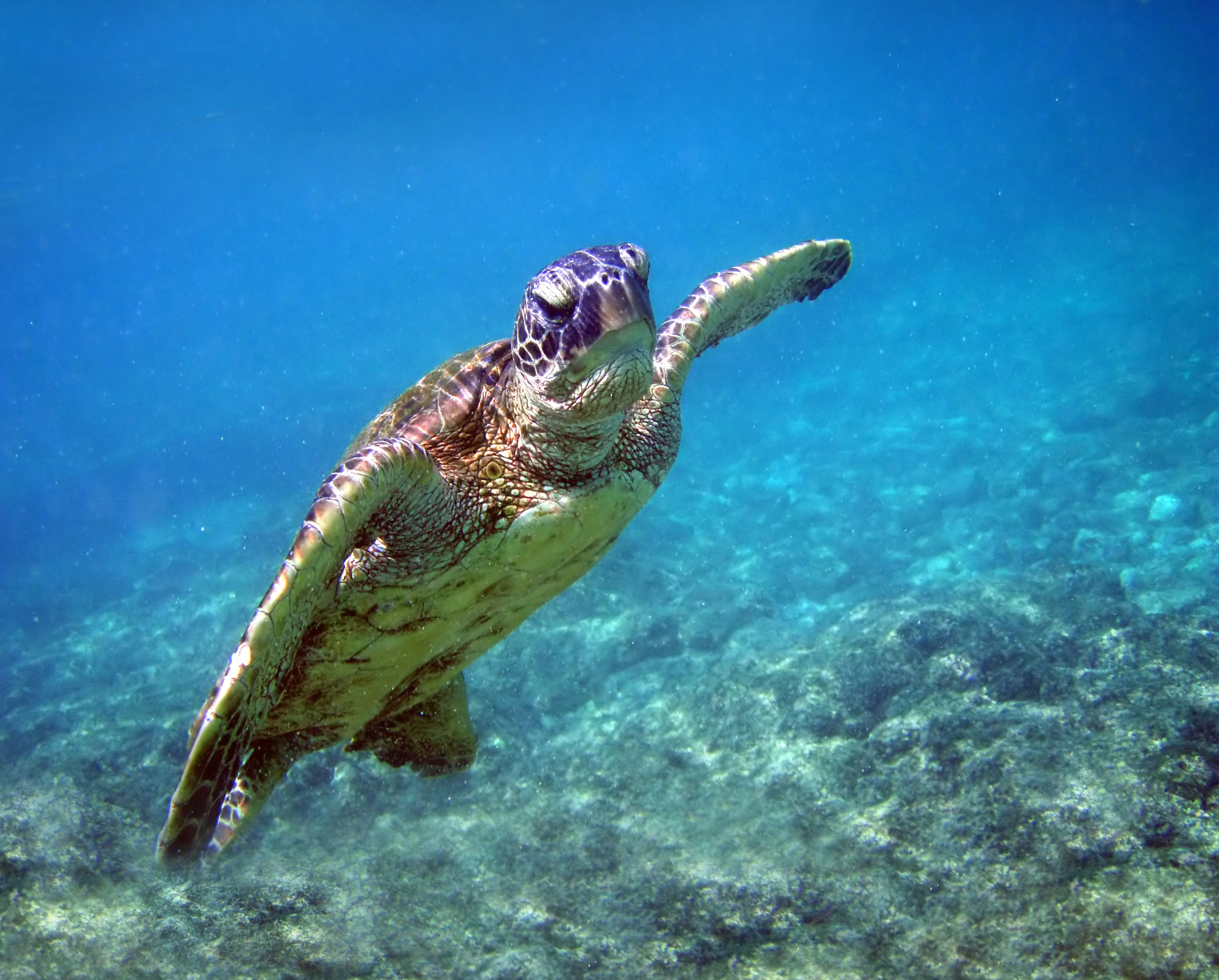
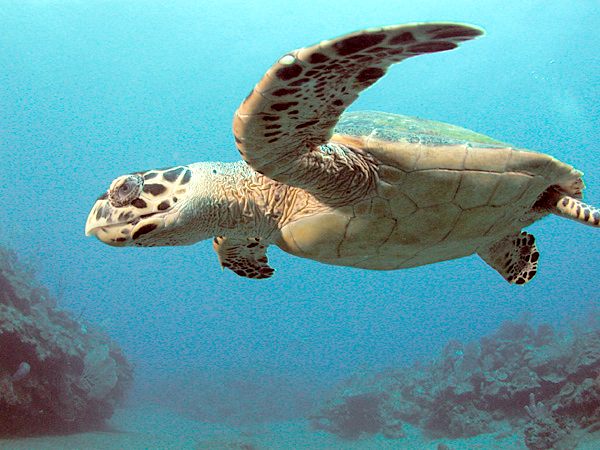
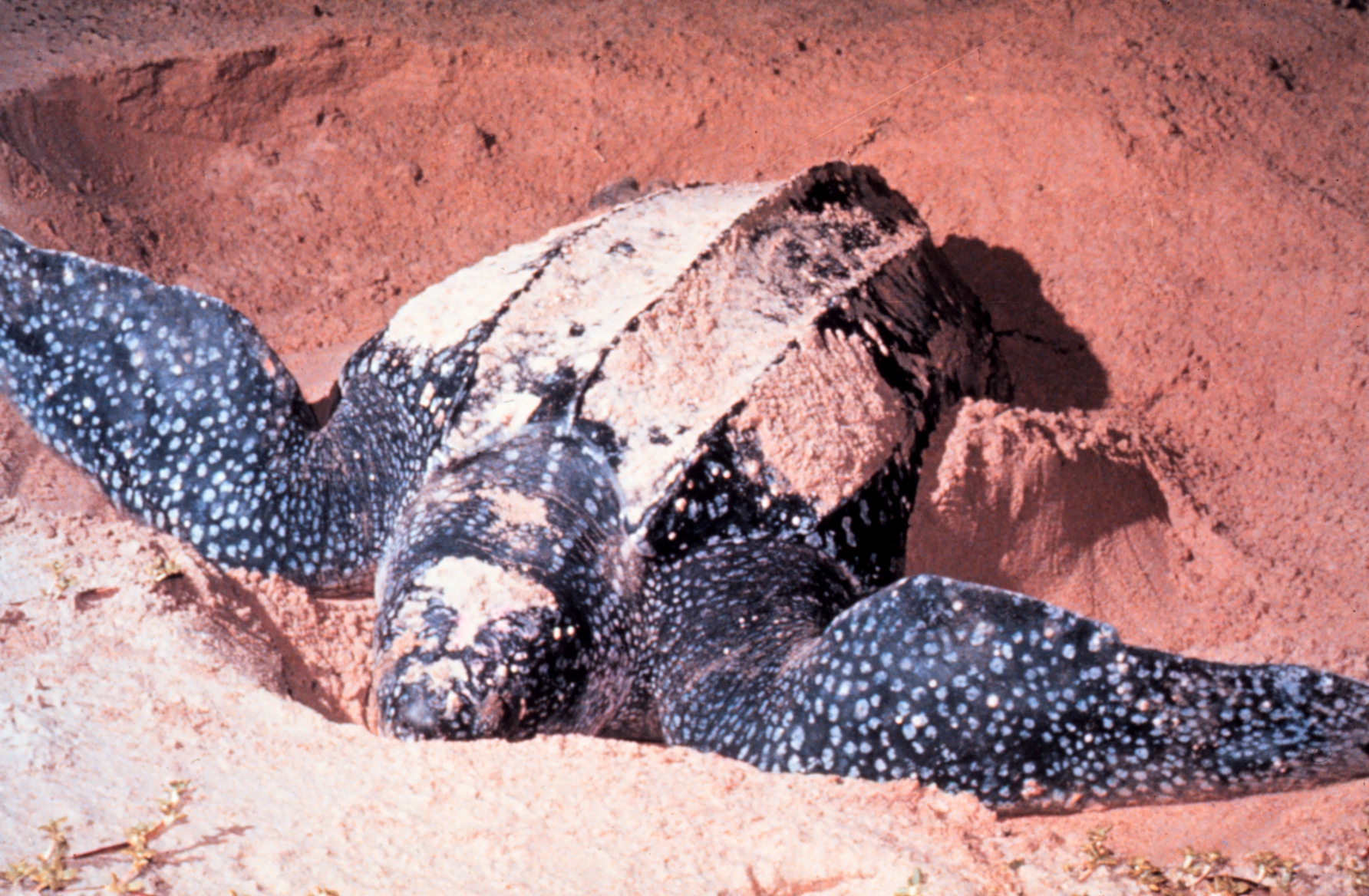
Tortoises (Testudinidae)
Species	Common name(s)	Notes	Image
Geochelone carbonaria	Red-Footed Tortoise	Presence on Saint Kitts questioned; not present on Nevis.
Scaly sea turtles (Cheloniidae)
Species	Common name(s)	Notes	Image
Caretta caretta	Loggerhead Turtle	Endangered.
Chelonia mydas	Green Turtle	Endangered.
Eretmochelys imbricata	Hawksbill Turtle	Critically Endangered.
Leathery sea turtles (Dermochelyidae)
Species	Common name(s)	Notes	Image
Dermochelys coriacea	Leatherback Turtle	Critically Endangered.

=== Lizards and snakes (Squamata) ===
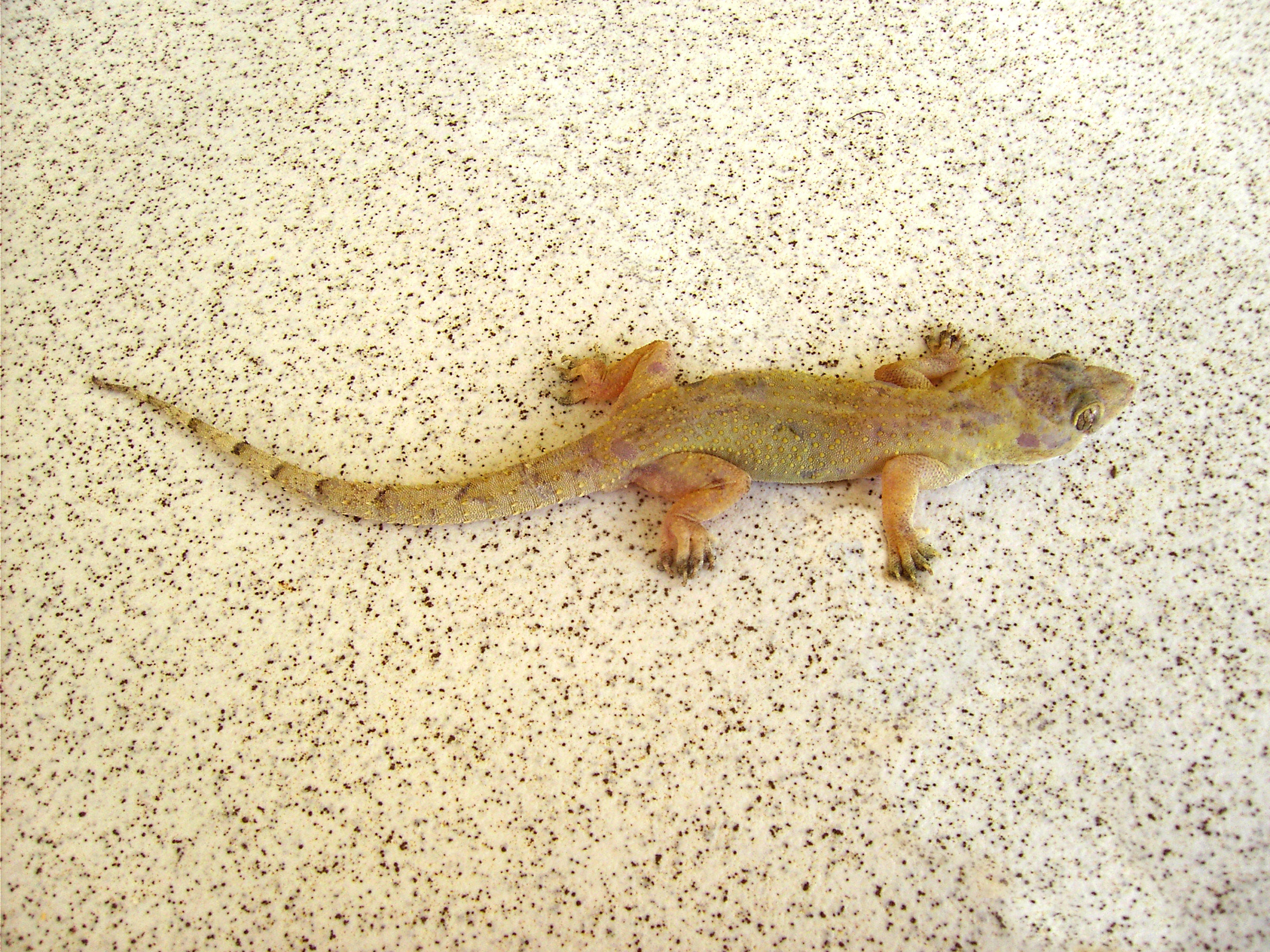
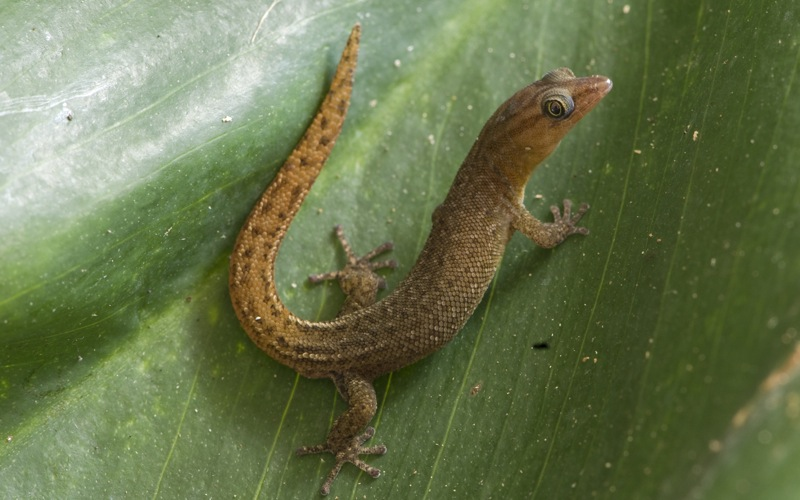
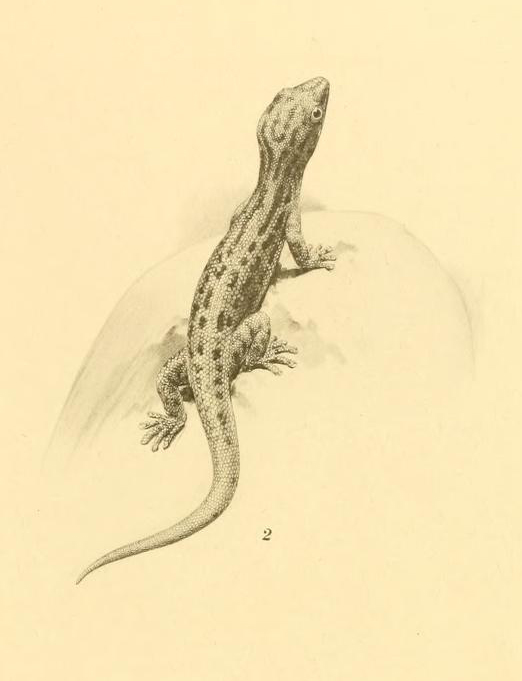
Geckos (Gekkonidae)
Species	Common name(s)	Notes	Image
Hemidactylus mabouia	House Gecko	Introduced. Not recorded on Nevis.
Sphaerodactylus sabanus	Saba Least Gecko	Regional endemic.
Sphaerodactylus sputator	Island Least Gecko	Regional endemic. Highly abundant.
Thecadactylus rapicauda	Turnip-Tailed Gecko	Rare.
Iguanas and Anolids (Iguanidae)
Species	Common name(s)	Notes	Image
Anolis bimaculatus	Panther Anole	Regional endemic. Relatively common and widely distributed up to 300 m in elevation.
Anolis schwartzi	Schwartz's Anole, Watts' Anole	Taxonomy as separate species unclear; alternately described as a subspecies of A. wattsi. Regional endemic. Common and widespread.
Whiptails (Teiidae)
Species	Common name(s)	Notes	Image
Ameiva erythrocephala	St. Christopher Ameiva	Regional endemic; scarce.
Worm snakes (Typhlopidae)
Species	Common name(s)	Notes	Image
Typhlops monastus	Montserrat Worm Snake,	Regional endemic; populations found on Saint Kitts and Nevis are of subspecies T. m. geotomus.
Colubrids (Colubridae)
Species	Common name(s)	Notes	Image
Alsophis rufiventris	Red-bellied Racer, Orange-bellied Racer, Saba Racer	Endangered. Regional endemic.
