= List of amphibians and reptiles of Sint Eustatius =

This is a list of amphibians and reptiles found on the Caribbean island of Sint Eustatius, part of the Netherlands.

== Amphibians ==
There is one species of amphibian recorded on Sint Eustatius.

=== Frogs (Anura) ===
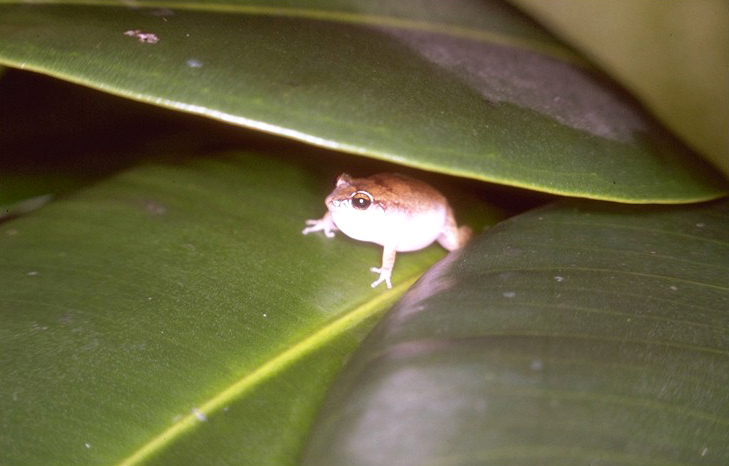
Tropical frogs (Leptodactylidae)
Species	Common name(s)	Notes	Image
Eleutherodactylus johnstonei	Lesser Antillean whistling frog, coqui Antillano, Johnstone's whistling frog	Least concern - introduced - abundant

== Reptiles ==
Including marine turtles and introduced species, there are 14 reptile species reported on Sint Eustatius.

=== Turtles (Testudines) ===
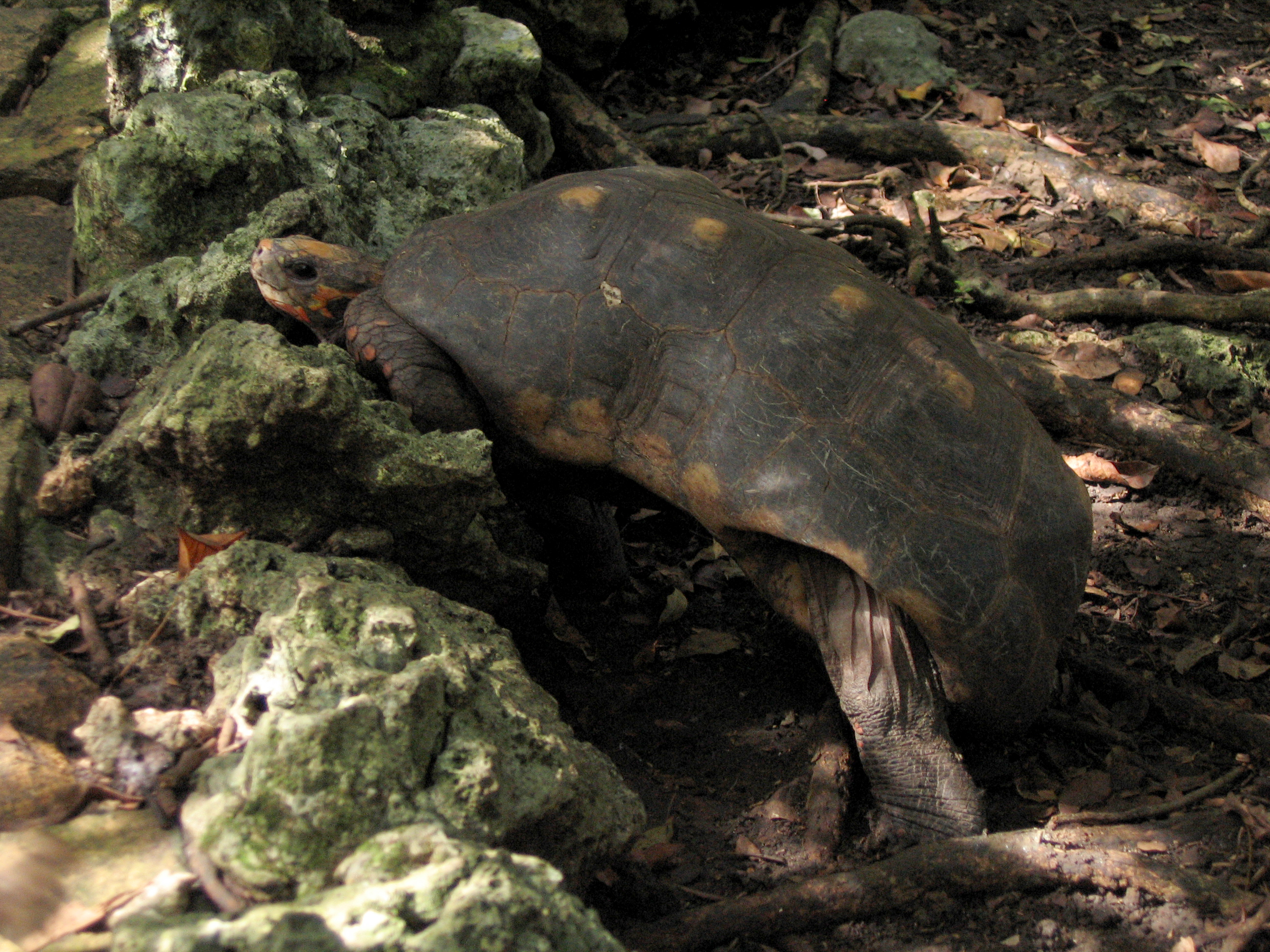
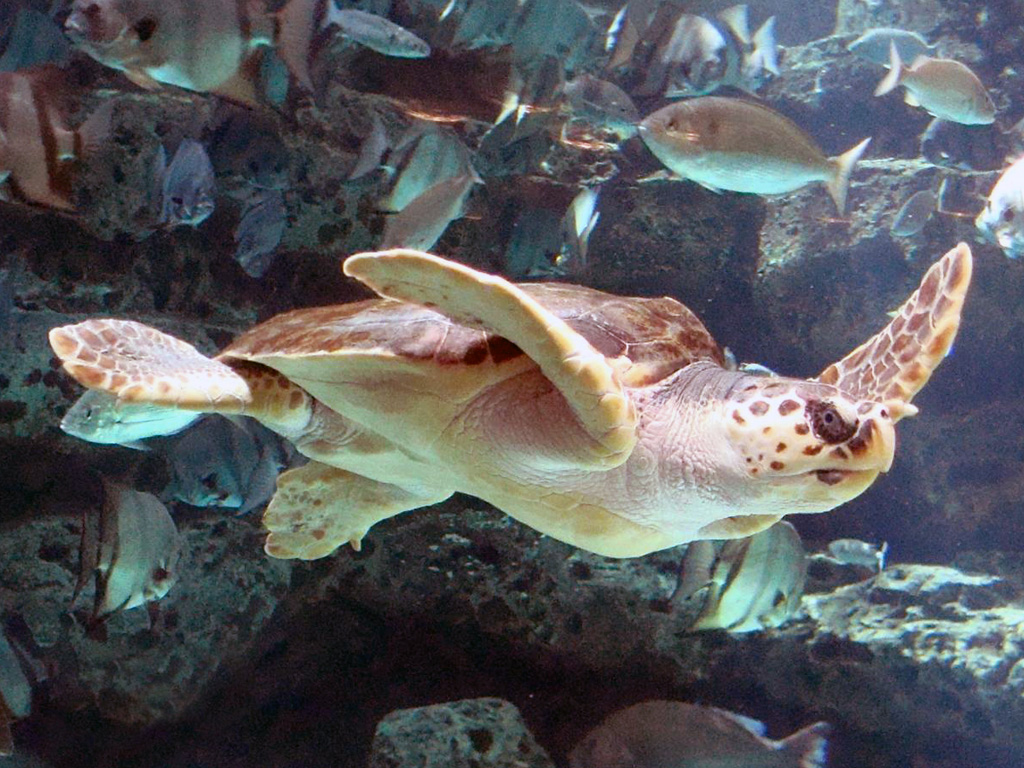
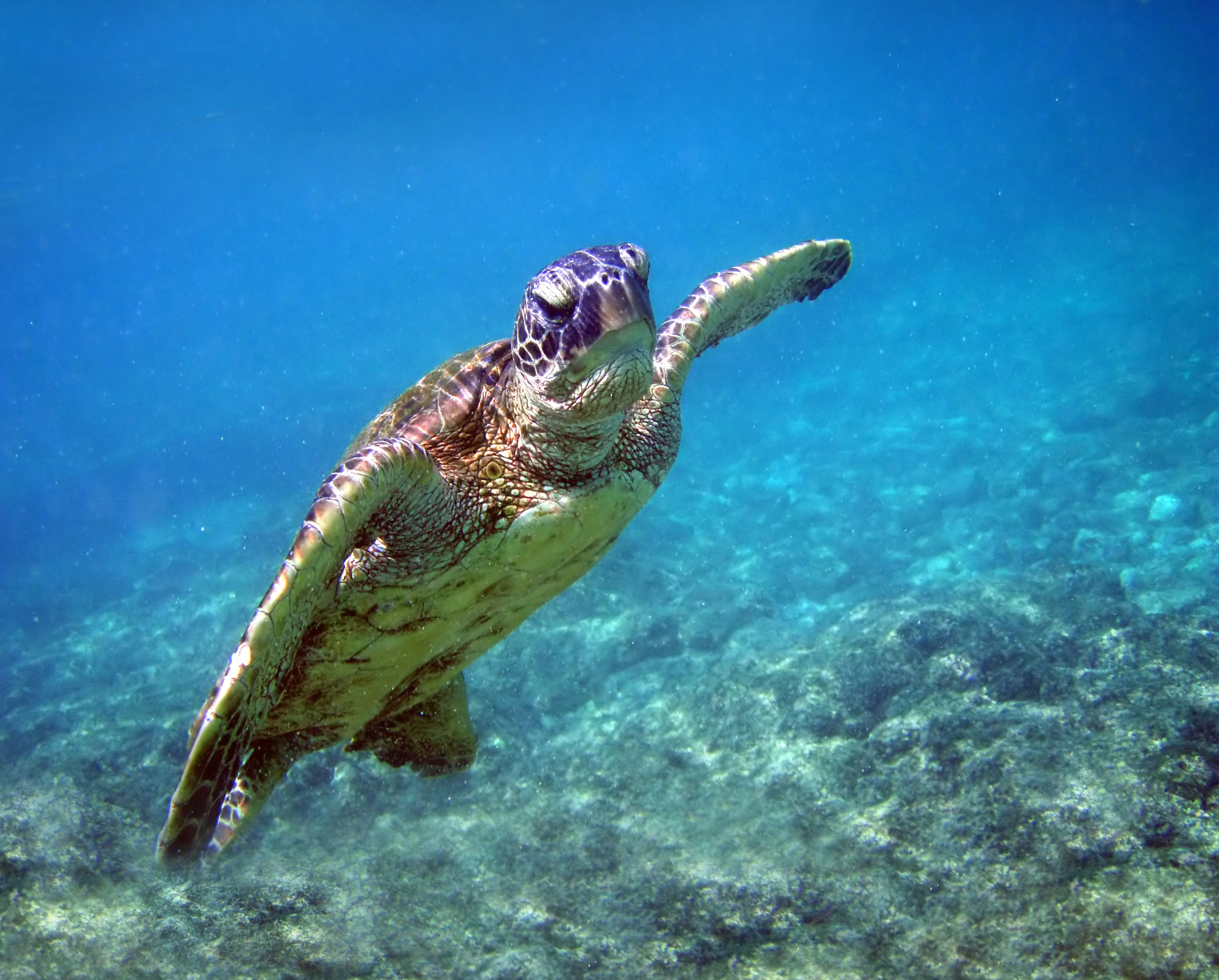
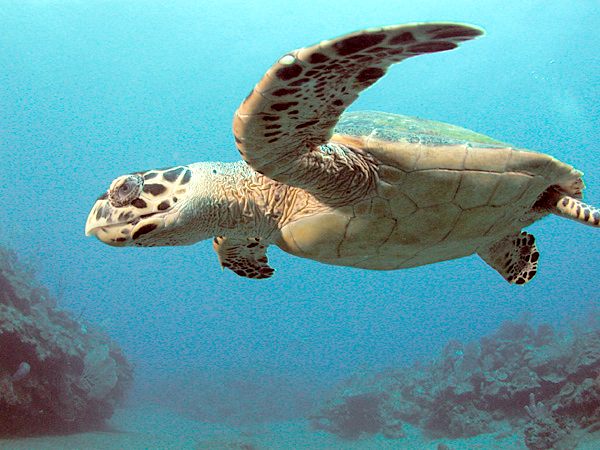
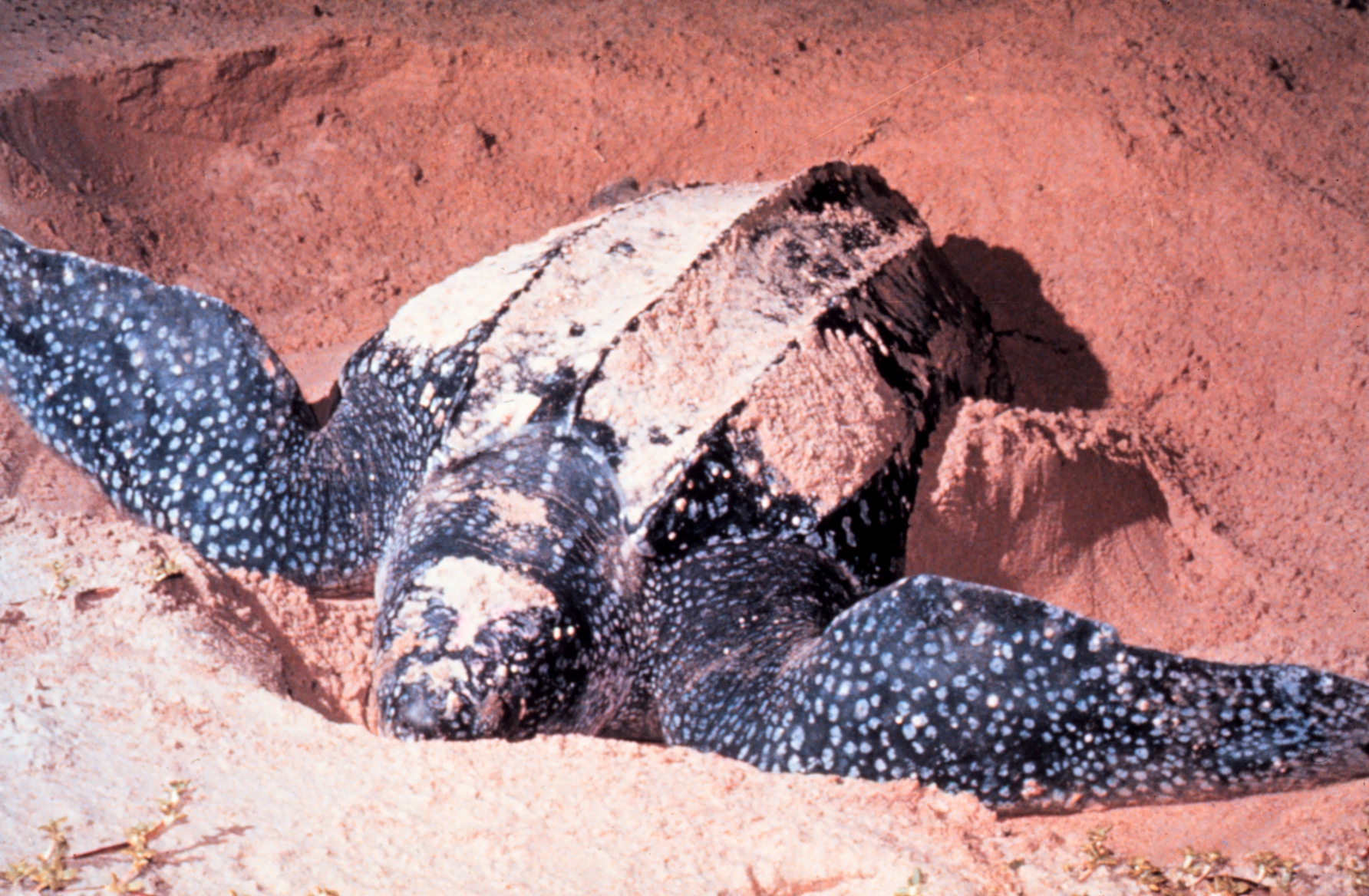
Tortoises (Testudinidae)
Species	Common name(s)	Notes	Image
Geochelone carbonaria	Red-footed tortoise
Scaly sea turtles (Cheloniidae)
Species	Common name(s)	Notes	Image
Caretta caretta	Loggerhead turtle	Endangered
Chelonia mydas	Green turtle	Endangered
Eretmochelys imbricata	Hawksbill turtle	Critically endangered
Leathery sea turtles (Dermochelyidae)
Species	Common name(s)	Notes	Image
Dermochelys coriacea	Leatherback turtle	Critically endangered

=== Lizards and snakes (Squamata) ===
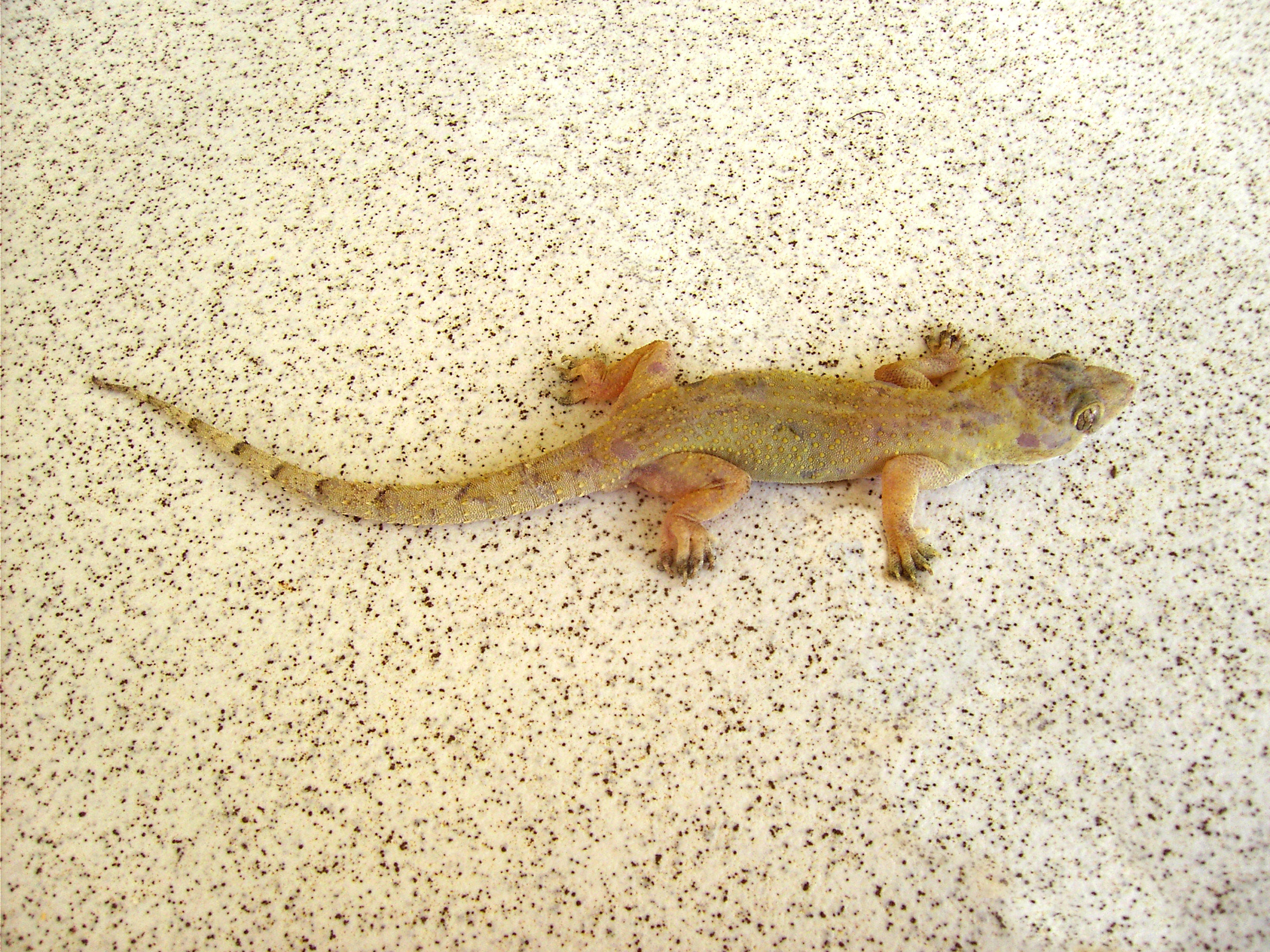
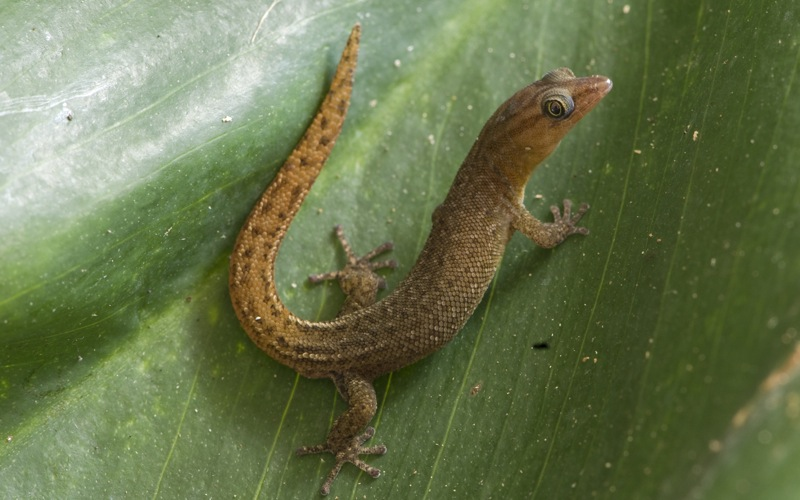
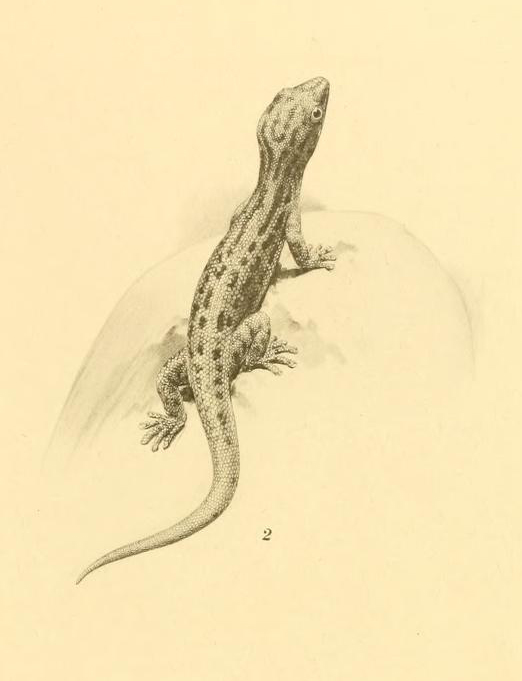
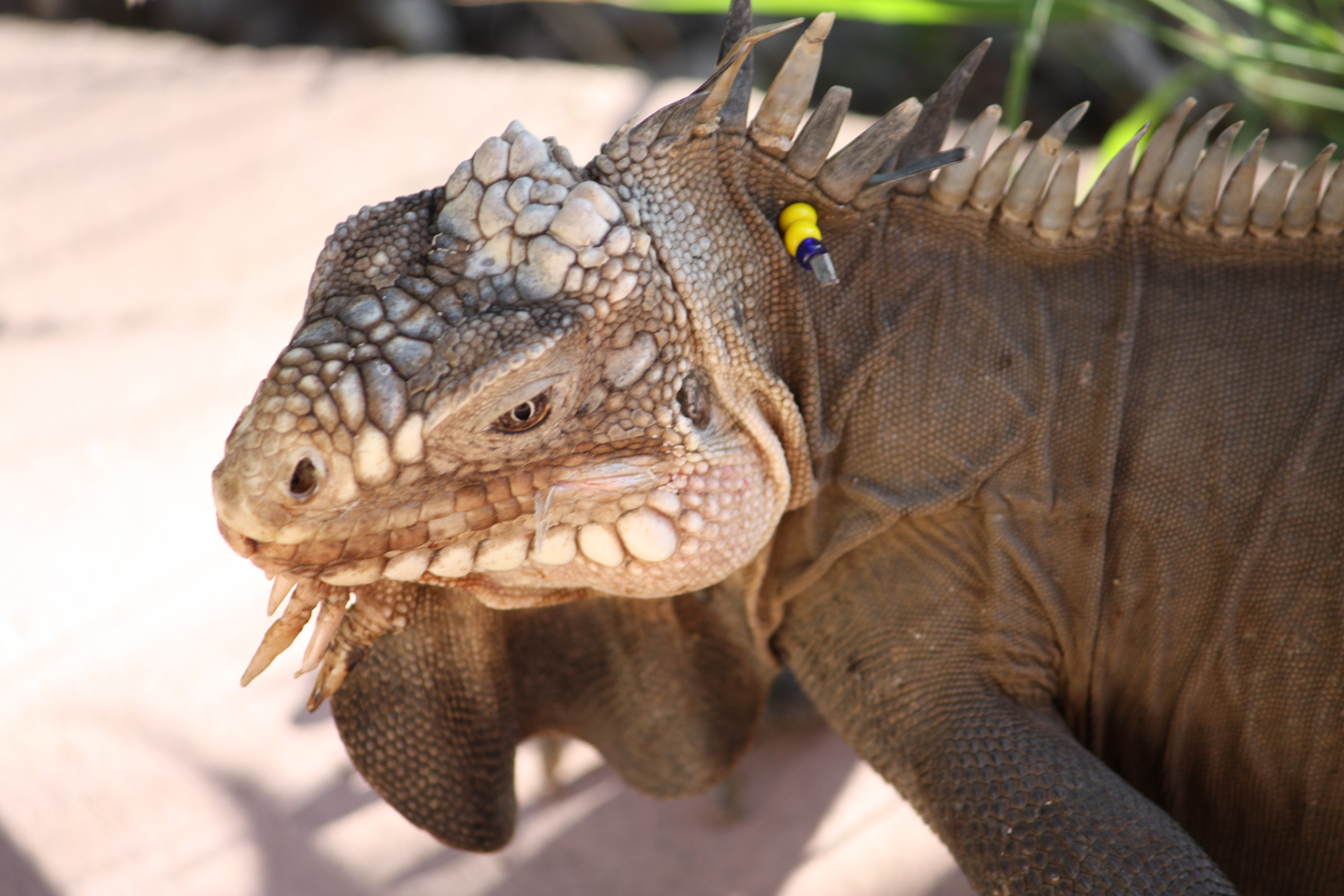
Geckos (Gekkonidae)
Species	Common name(s)	Notes	Image
Hemidactylus mabouia	House gecko	Introduced
Sphaerodactylus sabanus	Saba least gecko	Regional endemic
Sphaerodactylus sputator	Island least gecko	Regional endemic - highly abundant
Thecadactylus rapicauda	Turnip-tailed gecko	Rare
Iguanas and anolids (Iguanidae)
Species	Common name(s)	Notes	Image
Anolis bimaculatus	Panther anole	Regional endemic; also found on Saint Kitts and Nevis. Abundant.
Anolis schwartzi	Schwartz's anole, Watts' anole	Taxonomy as separate species unclear; alternately described as a subspecies of A. wattsi. Regional endemic; also found on Saint Kitts and Nevis. Abundant.
Iguana delicatissima	Lesser Antillean iguana, West Indian iguana	Critically endangered - regional endemic
Whiptails (Teiidae)
Species	Common name(s)	Notes	Image
Pholidoscelis erythrocephalus	St. Christopher ameiva	Regional endemic; also found on Saint Kitts and Nevis. Widespread and abundant.
Colubrids (Colubridae)
Species	Common name(s)	Notes	Image
Alsophis rufiventris	Red-bellied racer, orange-bellied racer, Saba racer	Vulnerable - regional endemic
