= List of amphibians and reptiles of Saint Martin =

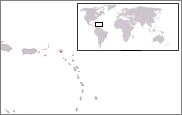
Location of Saint Martin in the Caribbean

This is a list of amphibians and reptiles found on the island of Saint Martin, located in the Lesser Antilles chain in the Caribbean. Politically, Saint Martin is divided between the Collectivity of Saint Martin on the northern half of the island, which is an overseas collectivity of France, and Sint Maarten on the southern half, which is part of the Netherlands Antilles.

== Amphibians ==
There are three species of amphibian on Saint Martin, two of which were introduced.

=== Frogs (Anura) ===
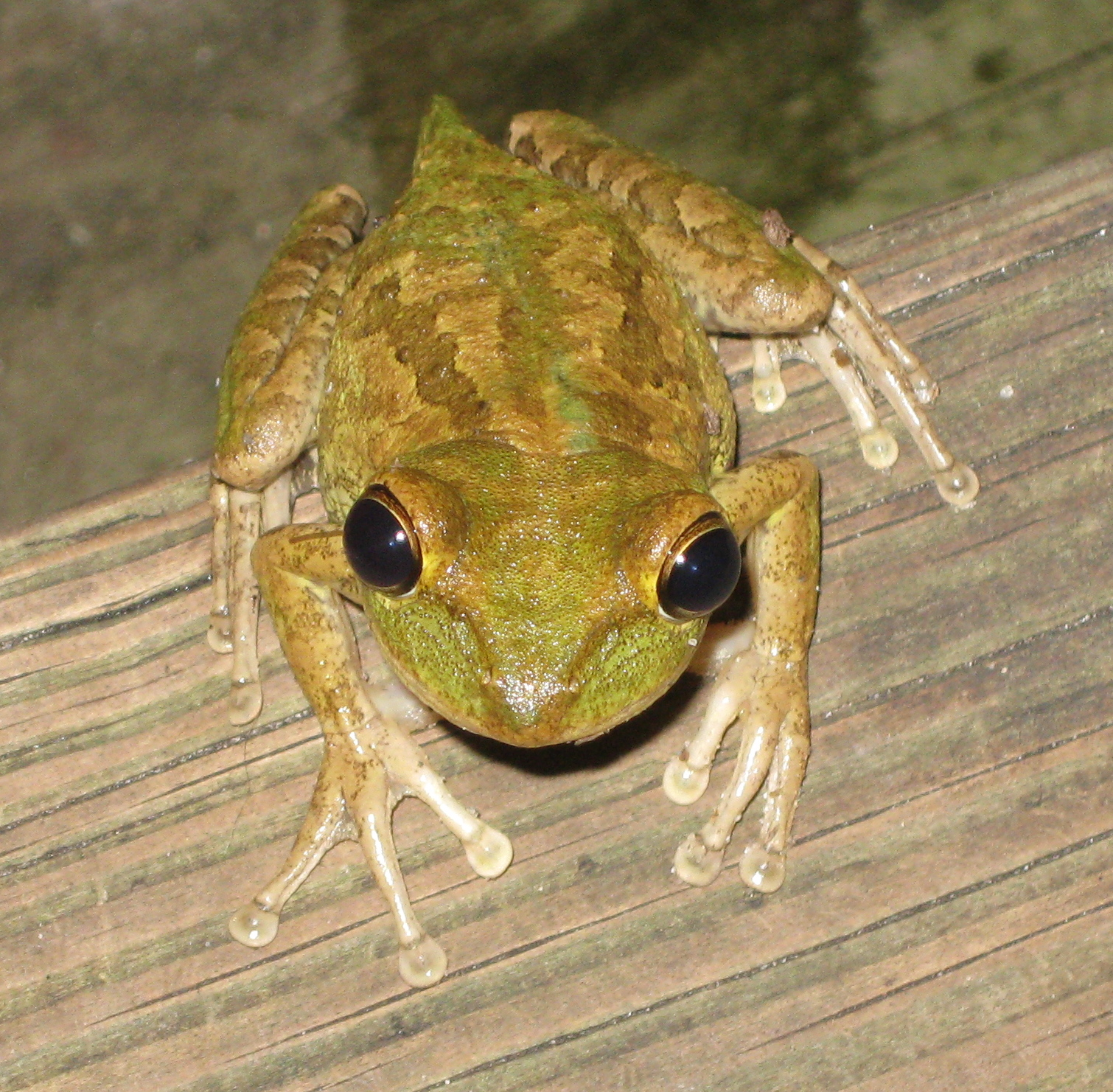
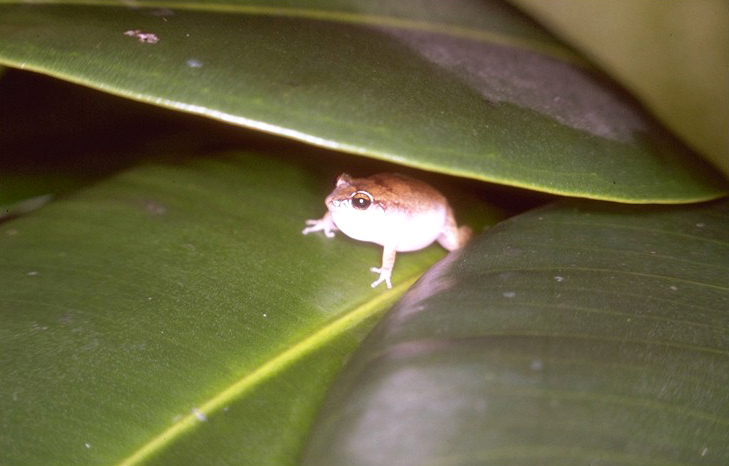
Tree frogs (Hylidae)
Species	Common name(s)	Notes	Image
Osteopilus septentrionalis	Cuban tree frog	Least concern. Recently introduced.
Scinax ruber	Red-snouted tree frog	Recent introduction.
Tropical frogs (Leptodactylidae)
Species	Common name(s)	Notes	Image
Eleutherodactylus johnstonei	Lesser Antillean whistling frog, coqui Antillano, Johnstone's whistling frog	Least concern.

== Reptiles ==
Including marine turtles and introduced species, there are 17 reptile species reported on Saint Martin. One species, the bearded anole (Anolis pogus), is endemic to Saint Martin. Its local population of one species, the regionally endemic and endangered Lesser Antillean iguana (Iguana delicatissima), was recently extirpated.

=== Turtles (Testudines) ===
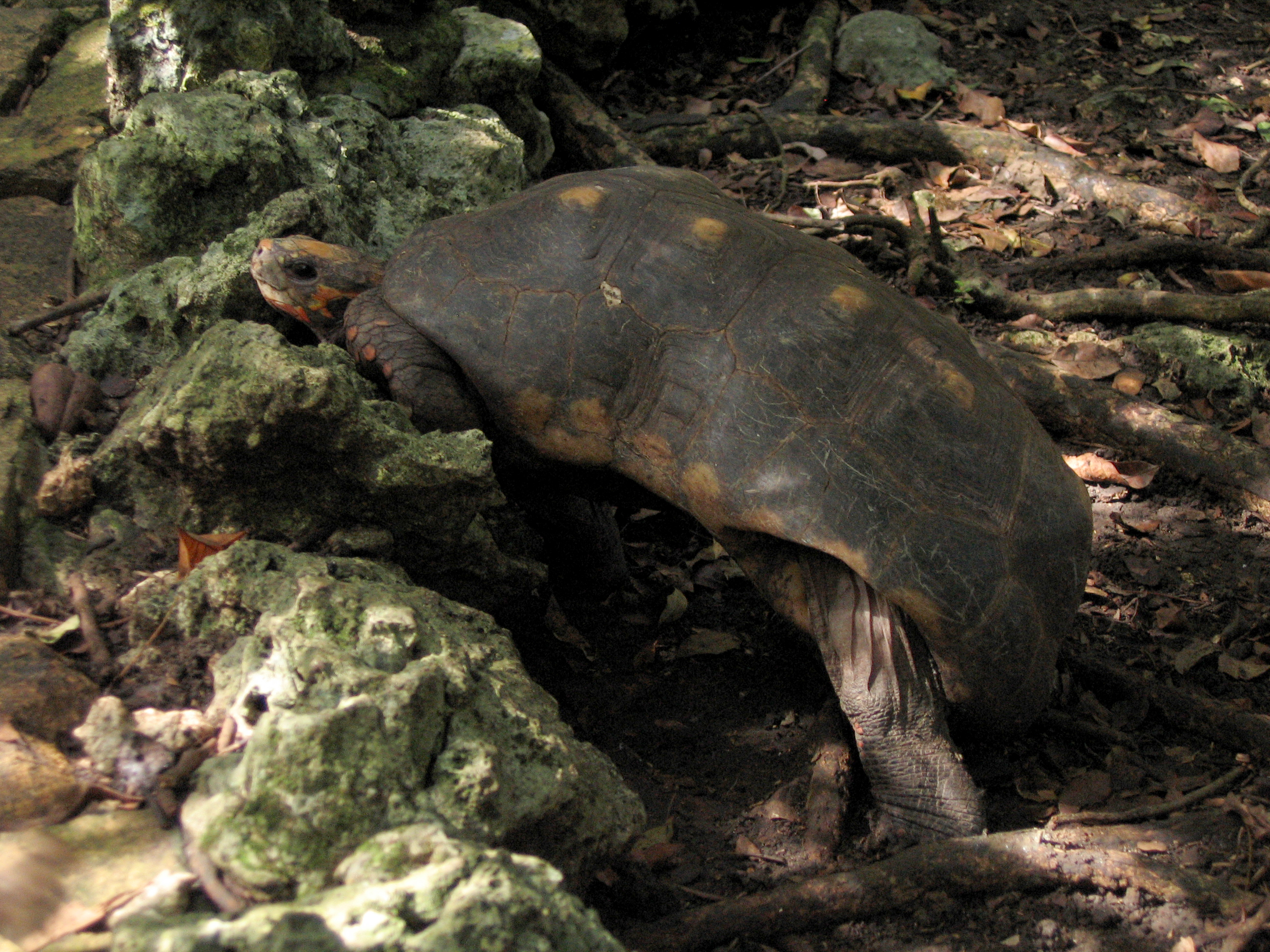
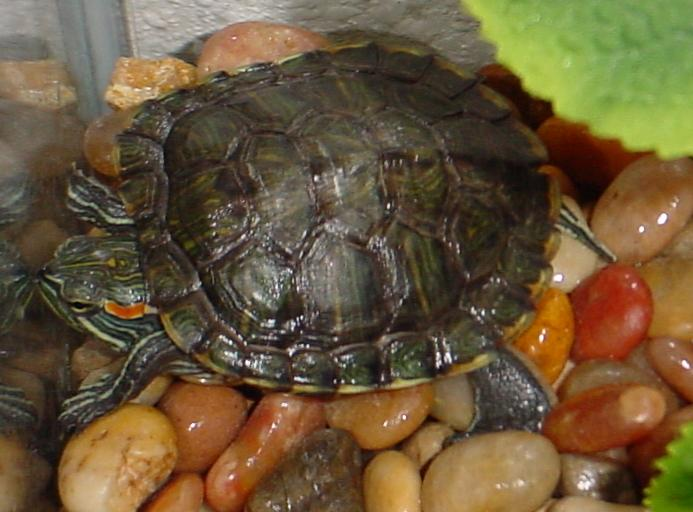
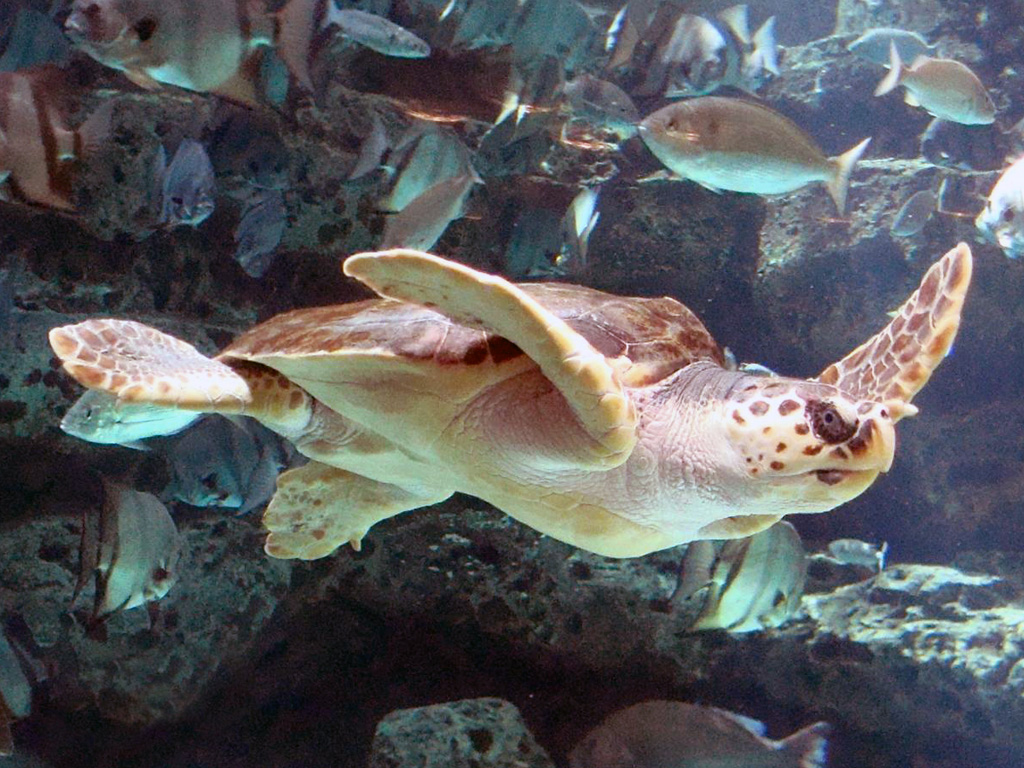
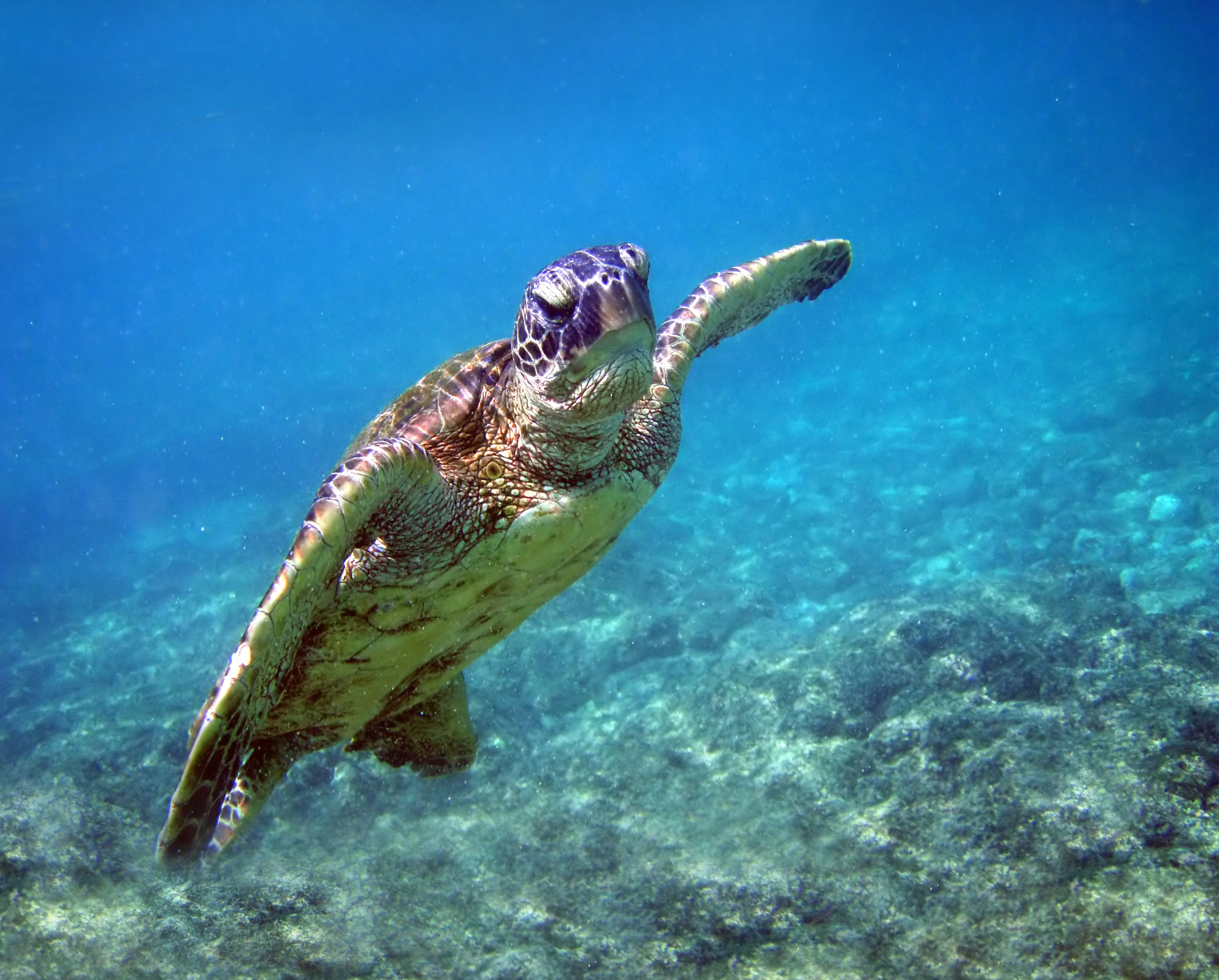
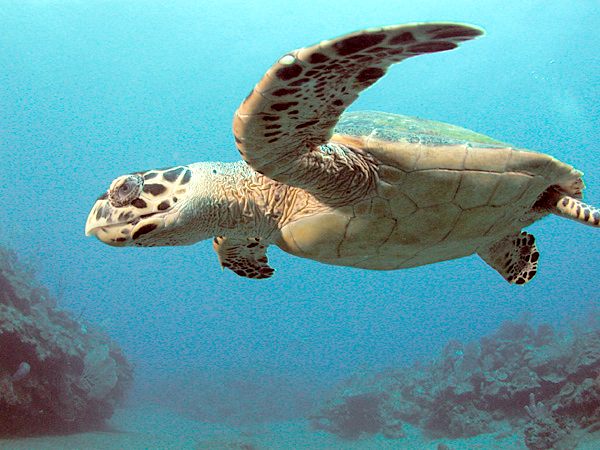
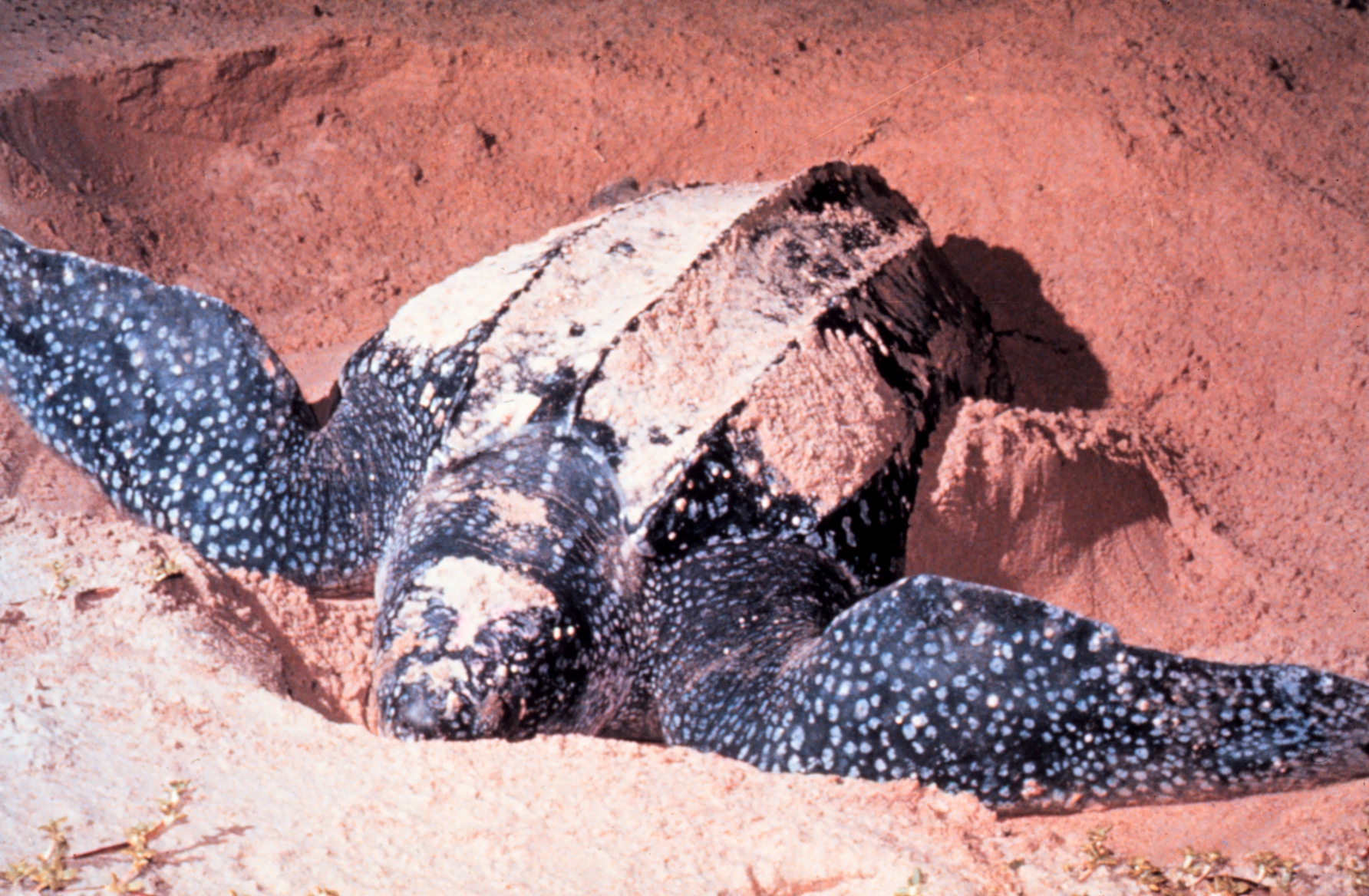
Tortoises (Testudinidae)
Species	Common name(s)	Notes	Image
Geochelone carbonaria	Red-footed tortoise
Box turtles and pond turtles (Emydidae)
Species	Common name(s)	Notes	Image
Trachemys scripta elegans	Red-eared slider	Introduced; abundant.
Scaly sea turtles (Cheloniidae)
Species	Common name(s)	Notes	Image
Caretta caretta	Loggerhead turtle	Endangered.
Chelonia mydas	Green turtle	Endangered.
Eretmochelys imbricata	Hawksbill turtle	Critically endangered.
Leathery sea turtles (Dermochelyidae)
Species	Common name(s)	Notes	Image
Dermochelys coriacea	Leatherback turtle	Critically endangered.

=== Lizards and snakes (Squamata) ===
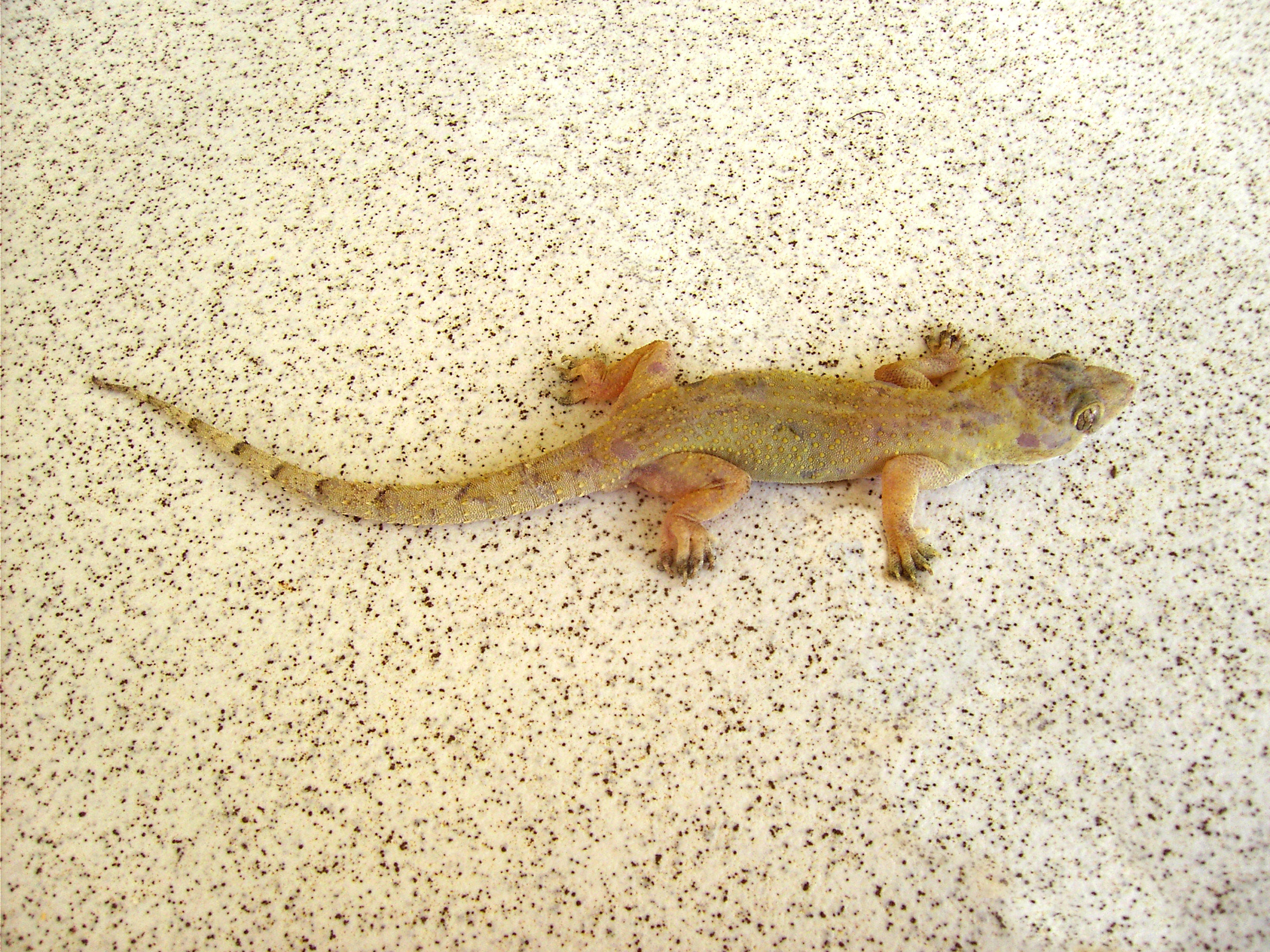
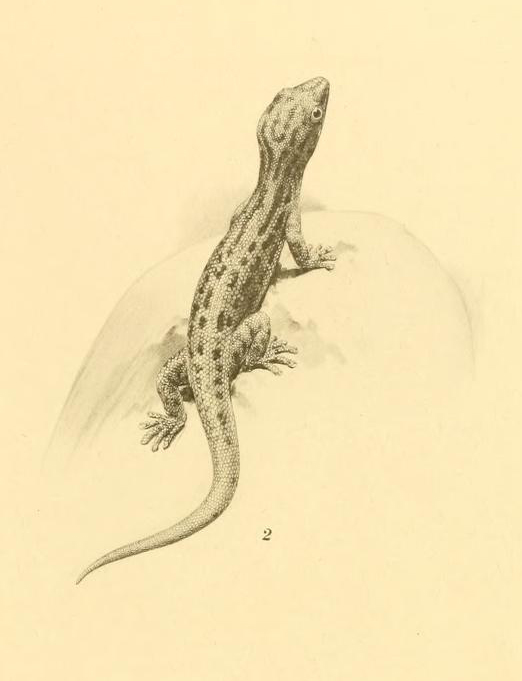
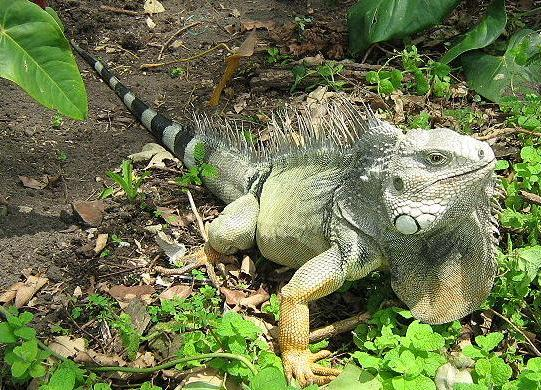
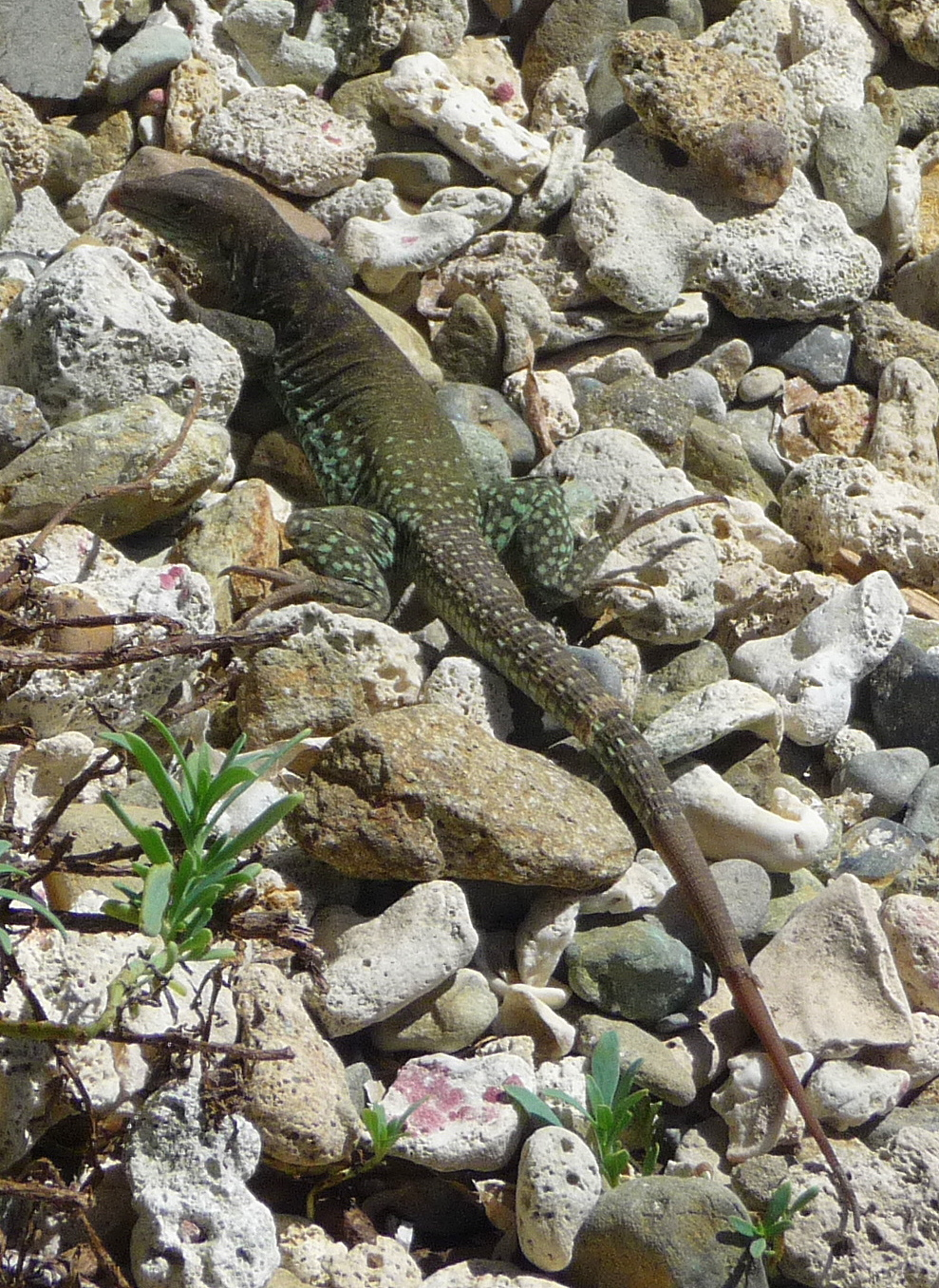
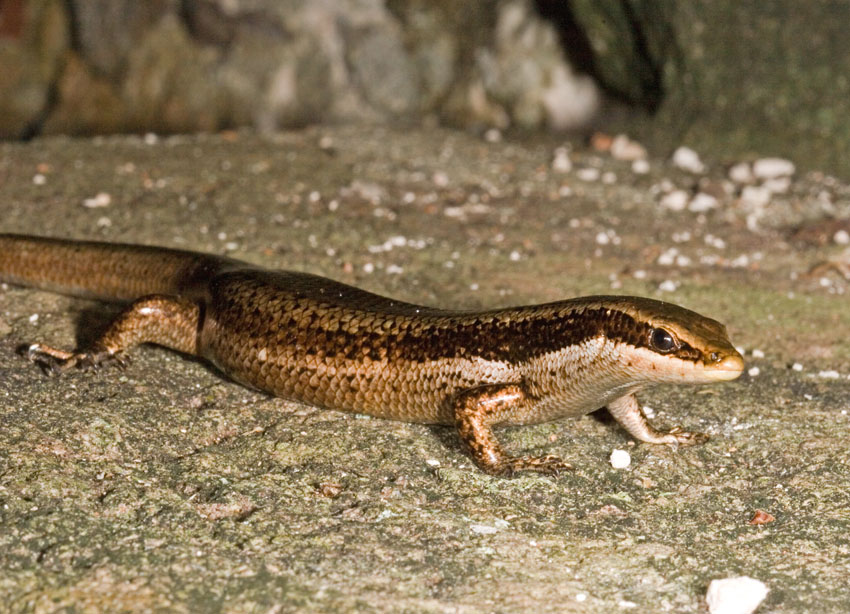
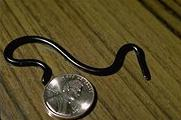
Geckos (Gekkonidae)
Species	Common name(s)	Notes	Image
Hemidactylus mabouia	House gecko	Introduced.
Sphaerodactylus parvus		Regionally endemic. Formerly described as subspecies of Sphaerodactylus macrolepis chiefly found in the Greater Antilles until elevated to species level in 2001.
Sphaerodactylus sputator	Island least gecko	Regional endemic. Highly abundant.
Thecadactylus rapicauda	Turnip-tailed gecko
Iguanas and anolids (Iguanidae)
Species	Common name(s)	Notes	Image
Anolis gingivinus	Anguilla anole, Anguilla Bank anole	Regional endemic. Abundant.
Anolis pogus	Anguilla Bank bush anole, bearded anole, Watts' anole	Endemic. Abundant. Previously occurred on Anguilla and Saint Barthélemy, but now extirpated from those islands.
Iguana iguana	Green iguana, common iguana	Recently introduced; very rare on Saint Martin. It out competed the endemic Iguana delicatissima in 20 years to extinction.
Whiptails (Teiidae)
Species	Common name(s)	Notes	Image
Pholidoscelis plei	Anguilla Bank ameiva	Regional endemic. Localized but abundant. Population on main island of Saint Martin (also present on satellite, Île Tintamarre) described as endemic subspecies, P. p. analifera, in 1992.
Skinks (Scincidae)
Species	Common name(s)	Notes	Image
Mabuya mabouya		Regional endemic. Possibly extirpated.
Worm snakes (Typhlopidae)
Species	Common name(s)	Notes	Image
Ramphotyphlops braminus	Brahminy blind snake, flowerpot blind snake	Introduced; rare.
Colubrids (Colubridae)
Species	Common name(s)	Notes	Image
Alsophis rijgersmaei	Leeward island racer	Endangered. Regional endemic. Possibly functionally extirpated on Saint Martin; restricted to small, isolated enclaves due to mongoose predation.
