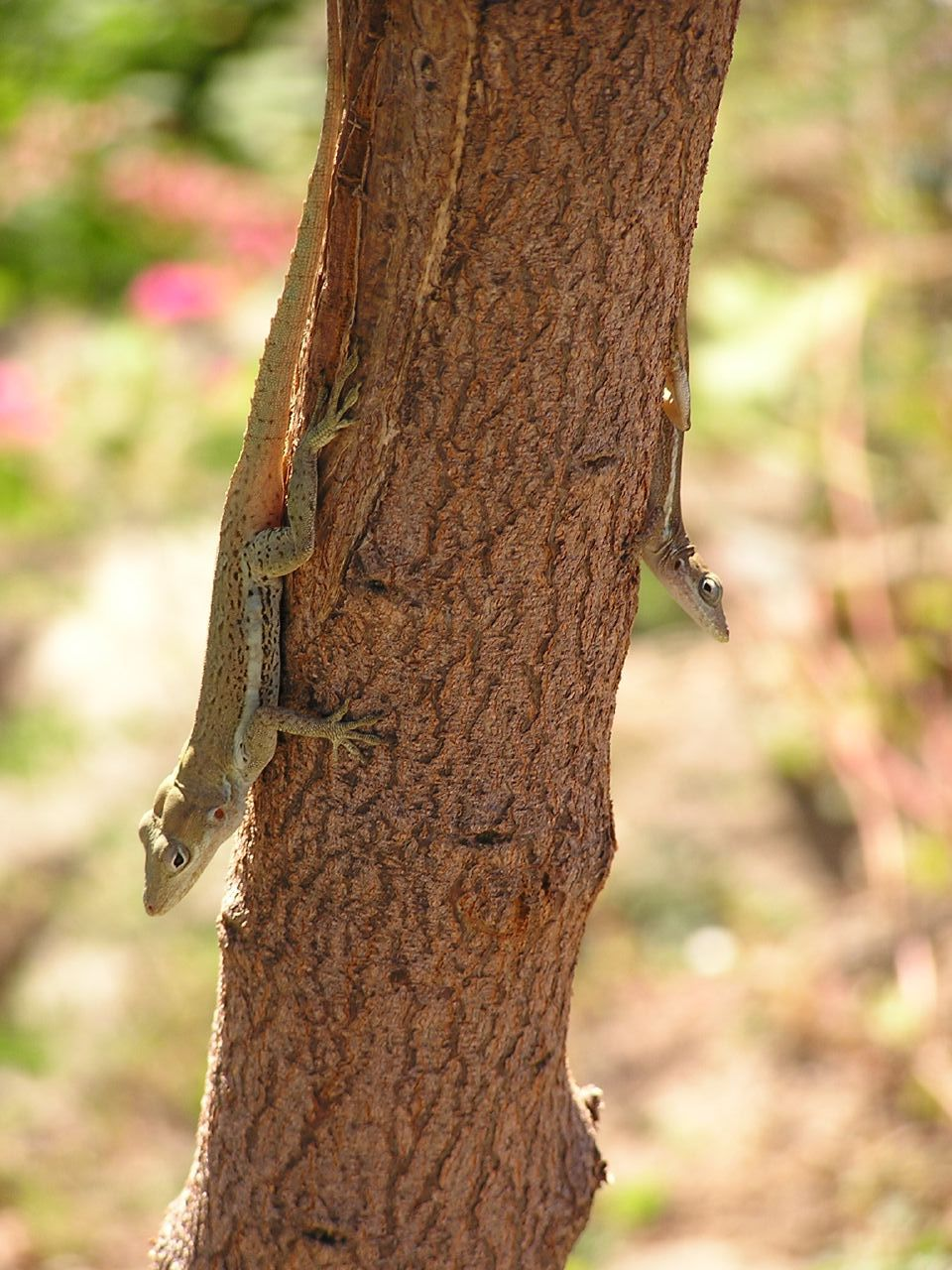

Conservation status
- Least Concern (IUCN 3.1)

Scientific classification
- Kingdom: Animalia
- Phylum: Chordata
- Class: Reptilia
- Order: Squamata
- Suborder: Iguania
- Family: Dactyloidae
- Genus: Anolis
- Species: A. gingivinus

Binomial name
- Anolis gingivinus Cope, 1864

Synonyms
- Anolis virgatus Garman, 1887

= Anolis gingivinus =

Species of reptile

Anolis gingivinus, also known as the Anguilla Bank tree anole, Anguilla bank anole, and Anguilla anole, is a species of lizard belonging to the family Dactyloidae, the anoles. This species is endemic to the Caribbean Lesser Antilles islands of Anguilla and its satellites, such as Saint Martin, and Saint Barthélemy.

== Taxonomy ==
Anolis gingivinus was first formally described in 1864 by the American paleontologist, herpetologist and ichthyologist Edward Drinker Cope with its type locality given as "Anguilla Rock near Trinidad". Later the type locality was designated as Sandy Ground, Anguilla by James D. Lazell Jr.. This species is in the A. bimaculatus species complex of the genus Anolis which is classified in the family Dactyloidae.

== Etymology ==
Anolis gingivinus has its specific name gingivinus which is Latin for "pertaining to the gums", Cope did not explain whu he chose this epithet, nor is it evident.

== Description ==
Anolis gingivinus males have an average SVL of 72 mm (2.8 in) while in females it is around 53 mm (2.1 in). The overall colour is olive to light grey with a vivid orange chinflap with bold stripes along the back, becoming paler on the sides. They sometimes have green on their lower bodies and males may show dark marbled spotting along the body.

== Distribution and habitat ==
Anolis gingivinus is found in the northern Lesser Antilles on Anguilla, Saint Barthélemy, Saint Martin and Sint Maarten, as well as their satellite islands. Anguilla Bank tree anole is a highly adaptable lizard and can be found in mesic to xeric habitats such as woods, coastal scrub, and overgrown fields, living in trees and on the ground. It is not found in grassland, and, as a result, its shows a localised distribution on Sint Maarten/St. Maarten and St. Barthélemy.

== Ecology ==
Anolis gingivinus is widespread and common on Anguilla and many of its satellites, though it is heavily preyed on there by American kestrels. It was the only anole species on Anguilla and throughout most of its range, until the recent introduction to Anguilla of A. carolinensis. A. gingivinus coexists on Saint Martin with A. pogus. Their distribution there does not completely overlap, and where they are both found they appear to fill different niches, for example by A. gingivinus preferring higher and more exposed perches.
