= Panther anole =

There are two species of lizard named panther anole:

- Anolis bimaculatus, endemic to the Caribbean Lesser Antilles
- Anolis leachii, endemic to the Caribbean
