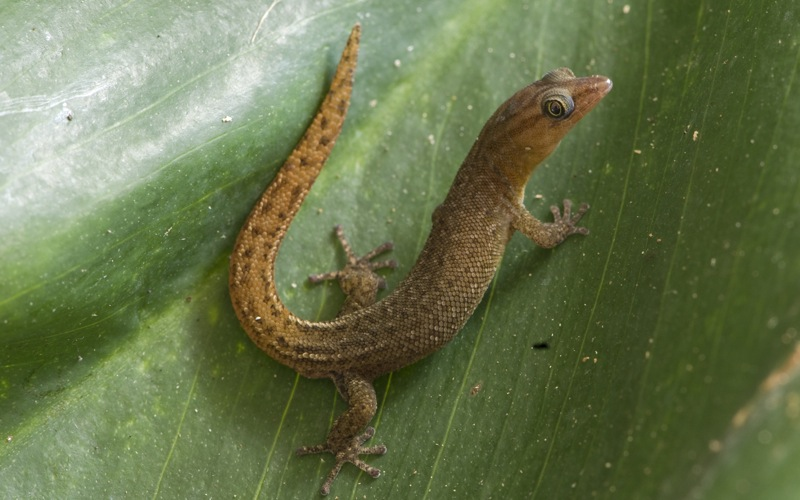

Conservation status
- Least Concern (IUCN 3.1)

Scientific classification
- Kingdom: Animalia
- Phylum: Chordata
- Class: Reptilia
- Order: Squamata
- Suborder: Gekkota
- Family: Sphaerodactylidae
- Genus: Sphaerodactylus
- Species: S. sabanus

Binomial name
- Sphaerodactylus sabanus Cochrane, 1938

= Saba least gecko =

Species of lizard

The Saba least gecko (Sphaerodactylus sabanus), also known as the Saba dwarf gecko, is a species of gecko endemic to the Lesser Antilles in the Caribbean. The Saba least gecko is a medium-sized least gecko, reaching a snout–vent length of 28 mm in females and 30 mm in males. The dorsum has a background color of light to dark brown. Some individuals are covered with patterns; in this case, they have dull orange heads, while unpatterned individuals are uniform brown. The throat is yellow-tinted white, yellow, or pale orange in color. The underside of the body is pale brown, light yellow, gray, or white. A unique color morph found on Sint Eustatius has an off-white head with a dark brown vermiculated pattern, alongside a dull yellow dorsum and white venter.

The Saba least gecko is found across the islands of Saba, Sint Eustatius, Saint Kitts, and Nevis. It is most abundant on Sint Eustatius and to a lesser degree on Saba. It prefers moderately moist habitats such as gallery forest, palms, and Coccoloba vegetation, but also inhabits less hospitable xeric habitats and human settlements. It inhabits many different micro-habitats, being seen in rocks, logs, dead agave, leaf litter, and human debris. The Saba least gecko is classified as being of least concern on the IUCN Red List due to its relative abundance on islands such as Sint Eustatius and Saba, as well a lack of known threats to the species and its stable population.

== Taxonomy ==
The Saba least gecko was formally described as Sphaerodactylus sabanus in 1938 by the American herpetologist Doris Cochran based on an adult male specimen collected from Saba. Specimens of sabanus had actually been collected over a century and a half earlier, but were misidentified as Sphaerodactylus sputator (island least gecko) and indeed included in the syntypes of that species, leading authors to mistakenly believe that sputator was polymorphic as late as the 1920s. Specimens of sabanus may also have been misidentified as belong to other Lesser Antillean Sphaerodactylus species prior to 1938.

== Description ==
The Saba least gecko is a medium-sized least gecko, reaching a snout–vent length of 28 mm in females and 30 mm in males. The dorsum has a background color of light to dark brown. Some individuals are covered with patterns; in this case, they have dull orange heads, while unpatterned individuals are uniform brown. There are dark brown stripes stretching from the nostrils to the neck, where they bend just before the shoulder and merge into each other at the middle of the body. There is a black-bordered buff or dark brown line from the snout to the top of the head, dividing past the eyes and continuing to a point just behind the orbit, past which it circles back to the center to surround a dark brown, black, or white spot on top of the head. The lines continue to merge just before reaching the shoulder region. These stripes are highly variable and can split or merge further to form spots, speckles, stripes, or a vermiculated pattern.

There are rows of pale spots on the body, usually becoming more prominent towards the tail, which is covered with white stripes. The throat is yellow-tinted white, yellow, or pale orange in color. The underside of the body is pale brown, light yellow, gray, or white. Geckos from Saba have brown irises, while those from other islands have black irises with a yellow ring around the iris. Two specimens found on Sint Eustatius had an off-white head with a dark brown vermiculated pattern, alongside a dull yellow dorsum and white venter, which may be a unique color morph restricted to that island. Juveniles are largely similar to adults in their coloration, but have darker lengthwise lines and a paler vermiculated pattern on the head.

There are 33–42 keeled, granular, and imbricate dorsals. The 28–33 ventral scales are smooth and cycloid, and stretch from the axilla to the groin. There are 47–66 rows of the scales along the middle of the body. The gular scales are keeled. The subcaudal scales are keeled, flat, imbricate, and acute. There are 2 postnasal scales, 1–3 internasal scales, and 3 upper labial scales. All of the snout scales are flat and smooth.

The Saba least gecko shares its range with only one other Sphaerodactylus species, the island least gecko. The Saba least gecko can be easily differentiated from the latter by its much smaller size and keeled gular scales.

== Distribution and habitat ==
The Saba least gecko is endemic to the Lesser Antilles, where it is found across the islands of Saba, Sint Eustatius, Saint Kitts, and Nevis. It is most abundant on Sint Eustatius and to a lesser degree on Saba. It prefers moderately moist habitats such as gallery forest, palms, and Coccoloba vegetation. It also inhabits less hospitable xeric habitats and human settlements, albeit at considerably lower densities, rarely being absent from areas with even minimal vegetation. It prefers slightly higher elevations, being most common in the uplands on Sint Eustatius and in ravines on Saba, but is usually only found up to 500 m, although small populations may live at even higher elevations. It inhabits many different micro-habitats, being seen in rocks, logs, dead agave, leaf litter, and human debris.

The species lays eggs to reproduce. Studies on interactions between and within Saba and island least geckos on Sint Eustatius have revealed several behaviors in the lizards. When male and female Saba least geckos are placed together, males generally begin courting the females by "staring at females, head bobbing, approaching while head bobbing, licking, waving their tails from side to side, and finally attempting to mount." The female geckos generally rebuff the males at some point in this process, with few attempts at mounting being successful. Male Saba least geckos placed with female island least geckos ignored each other, but female Saba least geckos placed with male island least geckos performed head bobs and licked the males, with at least one female attempting to mount the male. The male island least geckos generally rebuffed these advances. Females of both species were highly aggressive towards females of the same species, attempting to dominate other individuals by head-bobbing, licking, and biting, but generally ignored females of the other species. Males rarely attempted to touch or approach other males. The fairly passive behavior exhibited by these two species may be due to them sharing the same habitat, which has reduced the likelihood of performing energetically costly aggressive moves.

== Conservation ==
The Saba least gecko is classified as being of least concern on the IUCN Red List due to its relative abundance on islands such as Sint Eustatius and Saba, as well a lack of known threats to the species and its stable population. Its continued presence on highly human-modified islands such as Saint Kitts and Nevis suggests that it is able to withstand highs levels of anthropogenic pressure. Population densities vary from 727 to 1,427 per hectare in leaf-litter rich areas of Sint Eustatius, dropping to zero to two geckos per Agave plant in highly arid places. It may be affected by invasive species such as mammals and rats. It is known from some protected areas.
