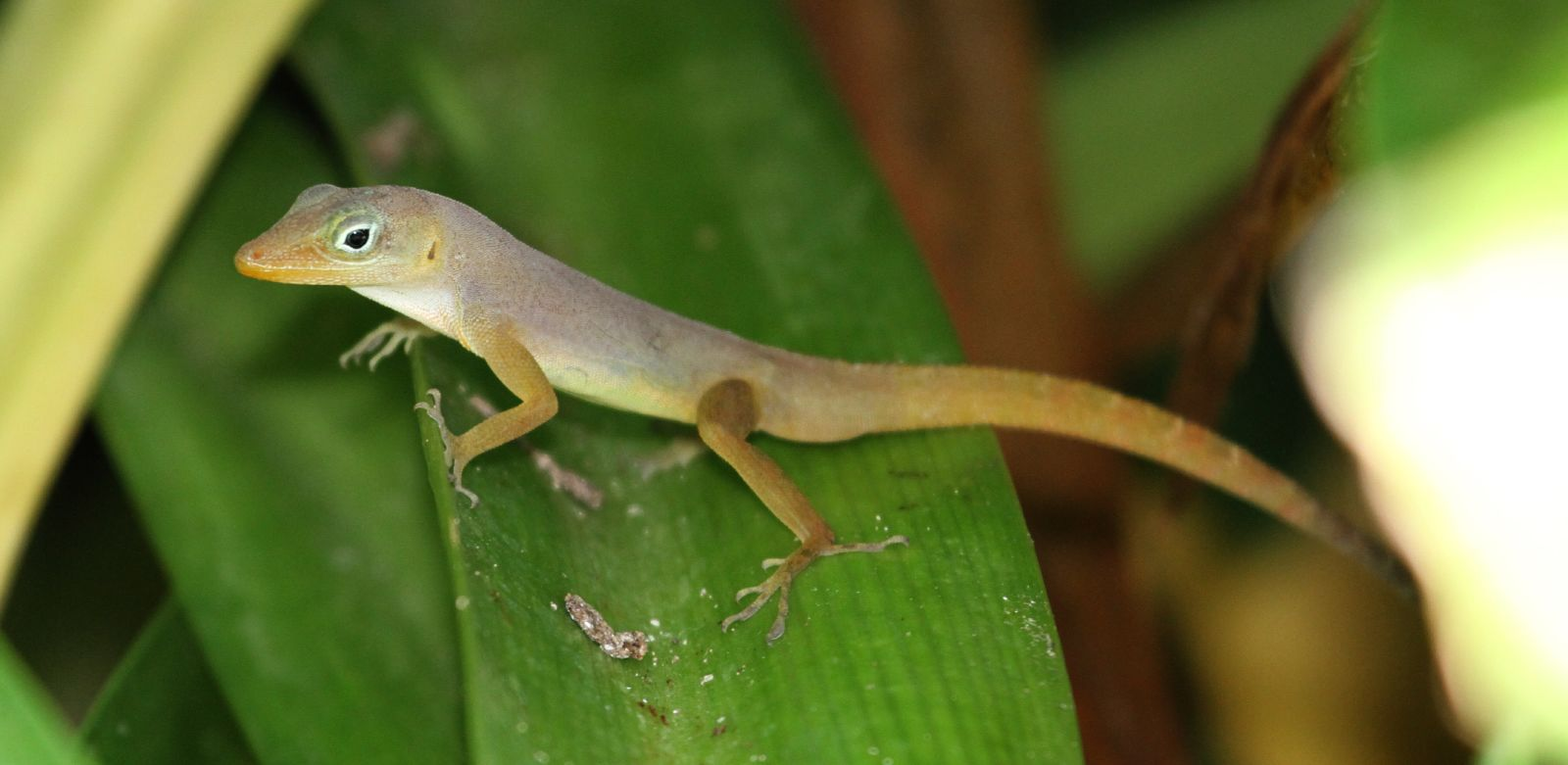

Conservation status
- Least Concern (IUCN 3.1)

Scientific classification
- Kingdom: Animalia
- Phylum: Chordata
- Class: Reptilia
- Order: Squamata
- Suborder: Iguania
- Family: Anolidae
- Genus: Anolis
- Species: A. schwartzi

Binomial name
- Anolis schwartzi (Lazell, 1972)

= Anolis schwartzi =

Species of lizard

Anolis schwartzi, known commonly as Saint Kitts Bank bush anole, Statia Bank bush anole or Schwartz's anole, is a species of lizard in the family Dactyloidae. The species is found on the islands of Sint Eustatius, Saint Kitts, and Nevis.

== Taxonomy ==
The first description of Anolis schwartzi was published in 1972 by James Draper Lazell Jr., who classified it as a subspecies of Anolis wattsi: Anolis wattsi schwartzi. The specific name schwartzi was chosen to honour American herpetologist Albert Schwartz. Jonathan Roughgarden was the first person to recognize the anole as its own species, doing so in 1987, with later authors being in disagreement over whether or not to recognize it as a species or subspecies.

== Distribution and habitat ==
Anolis schwartzi is endemic to the Saint Kitts Bank, present on the islands of Sint Eustatius, Saint Kitts and Nevis, and is the only anole present on these islands other than anolis bimaculatus. Of these two species of anole, Anolis schwartzi alone is prealent in the rainforests of these islands, which are usually found at higher elevations, while both species can be found in lowland areas. In lowlands, Anolis schwartzi lives in wet, shady areas.

== Description and behaviour ==
The maximum recorded snout-vent length of Anolis schwartzi sits at 53 mm (2.1 in) for males and at 46 mm (1.8 in) for females. Despite the fact that anolis schwartzi is significantly smaller than anolis bimaculatus, which can reach snout-vent lengths of over 100 mm (3.9 in), it is known to contest the larger anole species for lowland territory, and occasionally come out as the victor. Both males and females of the species have grey-brown backs, but vary in colouration of the bellies, which are "dull, rather metallic looking, yellowish brown" in males and "dirty whitish to dingy golden" for females. Males typically have deep orange throat fan and various other orange markings on their bodies, while females often lack orange colouration.
