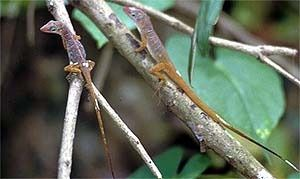

Conservation status
- Near Threatened (IUCN 3.1)

Scientific classification
- Kingdom: Animalia
- Phylum: Chordata
- Class: Reptilia
- Order: Squamata
- Suborder: Iguania
- Family: Anolidae
- Genus: Anolis
- Species: A. pogus

Binomial name
- Anolis pogus Lazell, 1972

Synonyms
- Anolis wattsi pogus Lazell, 1972; Ctenonotus pogus (Lazell, 1972)

= Anolis pogus =

Species of lizard

Anolis pogus, the St. Martin anole, Anguilla Bank bush anole or bearded anole, is a species of lizard belonging to the family Dactyloidae, the anoles. This lizard is restricted to the Caribbean island of Saint Martin, located in the Lesser Antilles. Its range used to include Anguilla, but it is now extirpated there. It may also have occurred on Saint Barthélemy.

== Taxonomy ==
Anolis pogus was first formally described in 1972 by the American zoologist James "Skip" Lazell with its type locality the Columbier Valley in Collectivity of Saint Martin on the island of Saint Martin. This species is in the A. bimaculatus species complex of the genus Anolis which is classified in the family Dactyloidae. Previously described as a subspecies of A. wattsi, it was elevated to species level in 1990.

== Etymology ==
Anolis pogus has the specific name pogus, after Pogo the Possum, a cartoon character, as Lazell wanted to show that scientific named did not really have to be meaningful.

== Description ==
Anolis pogus has a white throat flap in males which are marked with dark green vertical bars across the back. The females have no flank stripe. The scales below the eye are blue, brick red or white. The largest males in the type series were 50 mm (2.0 in) while the largest females were 42 mm (1.7 in).

== Distribution and habitat ==
Anolis pogus is now restricted to the island of Saint Martin which is divided into the Collectivity of Saint Martin and the Dutch constituent country of Sint Maarten, it was last recorded in Anguilla in 1922, it may also have been present on Saint Barthélemy. On Saint Martin this species is abundant in the vegetated uplands, however, it can be found over the whole of the island.
