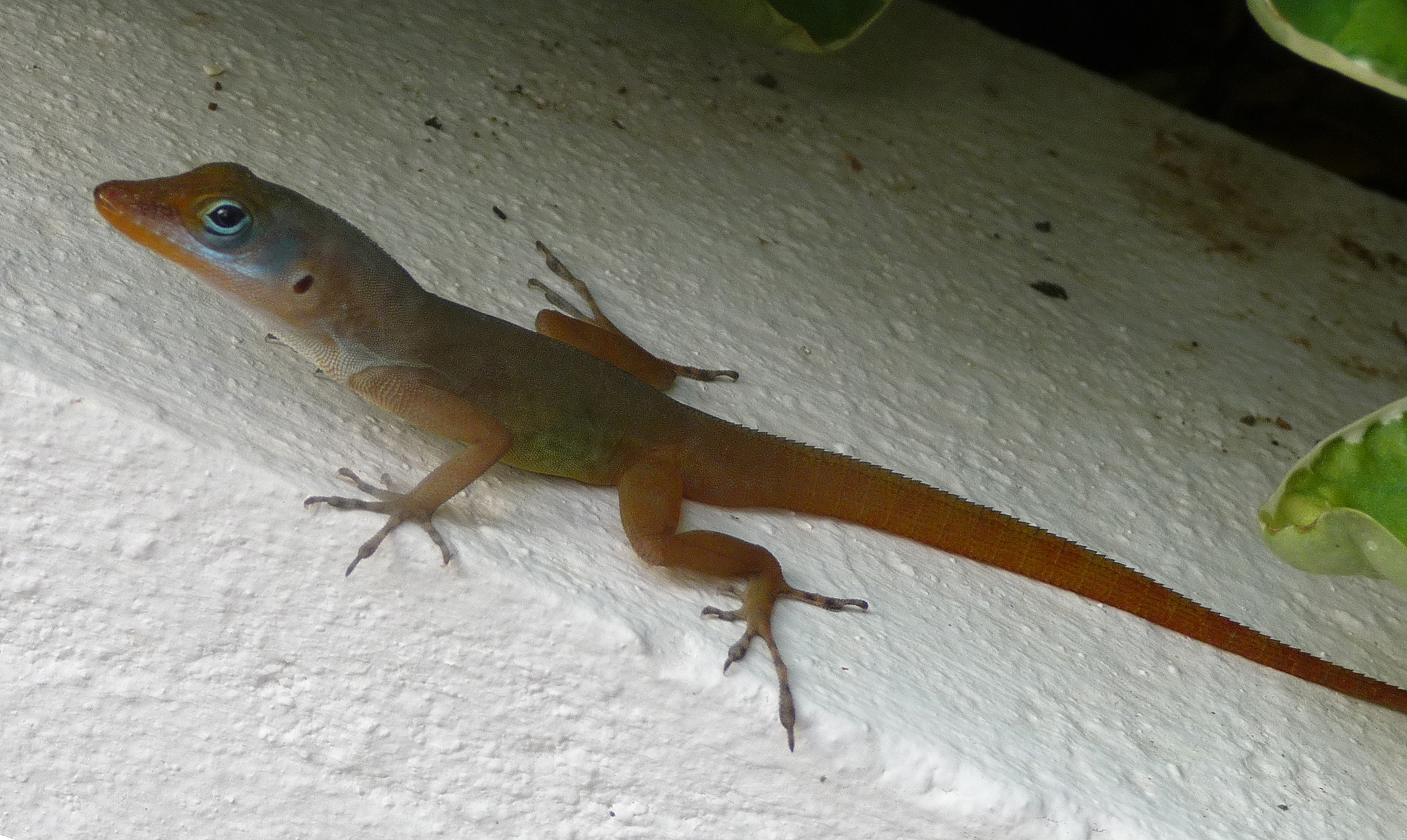

Conservation status
- Least Concern (IUCN 3.1)

Scientific classification
- Kingdom: Animalia
- Phylum: Chordata
- Class: Reptilia
- Order: Squamata
- Suborder: Iguania
- Family: Dactyloidae
- Genus: Anolis
- Species: A. wattsii

Binomial name
- Anolis wattsii Boulenger, 1894

Subspecies
- (unclear; see text)

= Anolis wattsii =

Species of lizard

Anolis wattsii, commonly known as Watts's anole or the Antigua Bank bush anole, is a species of anole, a lizard in the family Dactyloidae. The species is native to islands in the Caribbean Lesser Antilles.

== Geographic range ==
Anolis wattsii is native to Antigua, and has also been introduced to Saint Lucia.

== Taxonomy ==
Anolis pogus was formerly described as a subspecies of A. wattsii. The taxonomy of two further subspecies, sometimes described as A. schwartzi and A. forresti, is unclear. At a minimum, the three taxa are very closely related, and similar in appearance, ecology, and behavior. A. w. schwartzi is found on Sint Eustatius, Saint Kitts, and Nevis. A. w. forresti is endemic to Barbuda.

== Etymology ==
The specific name, wattsii, is in honor of Dr. Sir Francis Watts who became the Commissioner of Agriculture for the West Indies.

== Sources ==
- Malhotra, Anita; Thorpe, Roger S. (1999). Reptiles and Amphibians of the Eastern Caribbean. London: Macmillan Education Ltd. ISBN 0-333-69141-5. (pp. 67, 68, 71).
