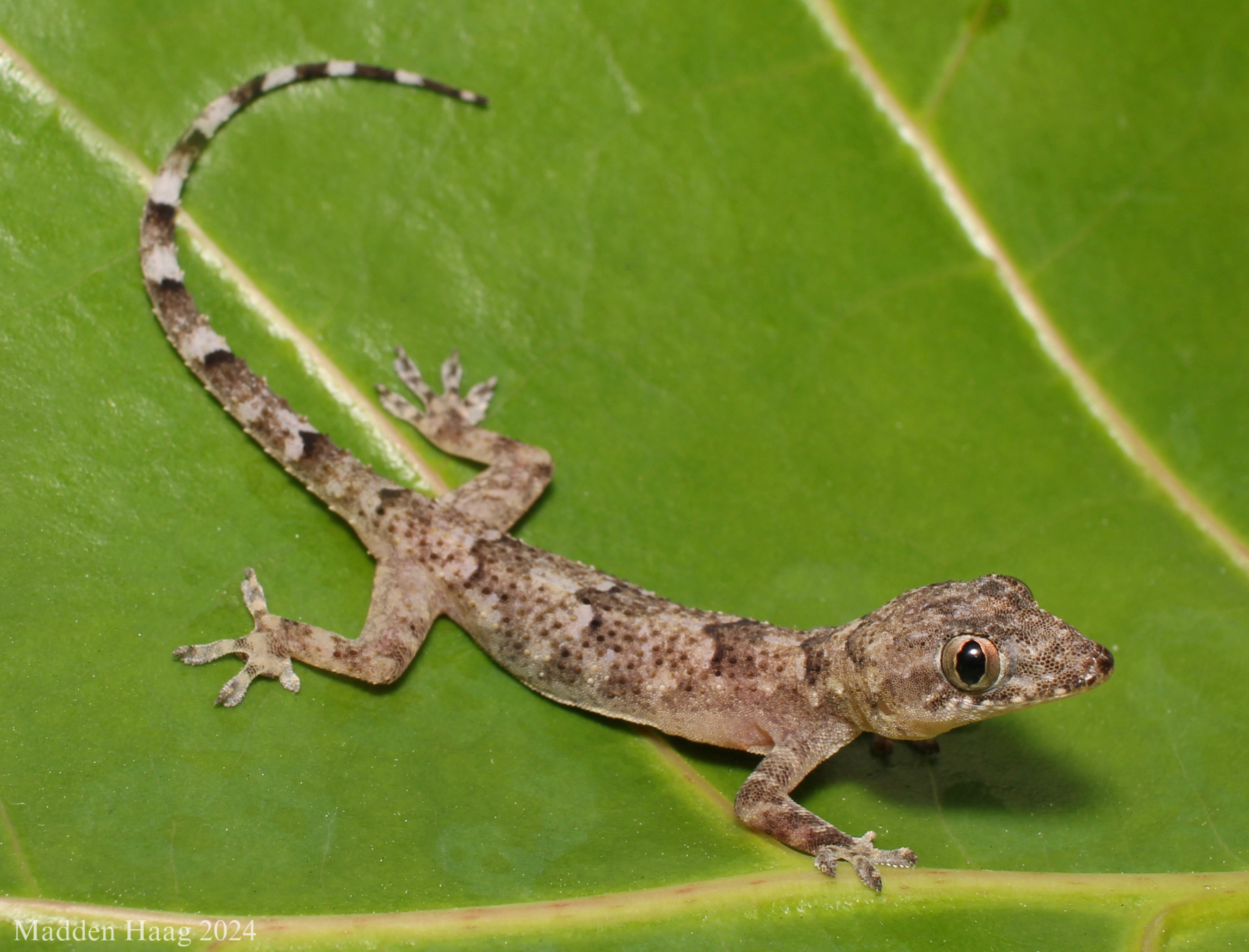

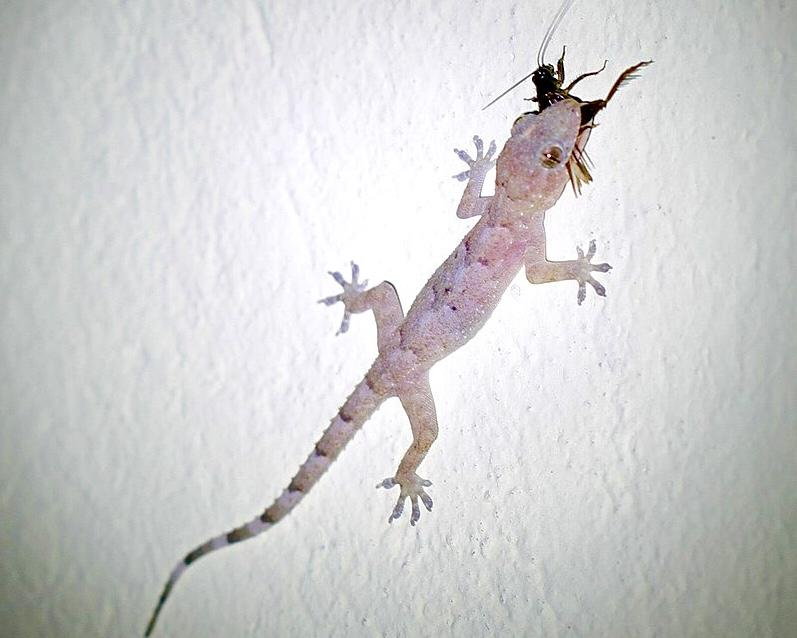

Conservation status
- Least Concern (IUCN 3.1)

Scientific classification
- Kingdom: Animalia
- Phylum: Chordata
- Class: Reptilia
- Order: Squamata
- Suborder: Gekkota
- Family: Gekkonidae
- Genus: Hemidactylus
- Species: H. mabouia

Binomial name
- Hemidactylus mabouia (Moreau de Jonnès, 1818)
- IUCN distribution (2019) Extant (resident) Extant & Introduced (resident)

Synonyms
- Gecko mabouia Moreau de Jonnès, 1818; Gecko tuberculosus Raddi, 1823; Hemidactylus mabouia — A.M.C. Duméril & Bibron, 1836

= Tropical house gecko =

Species of gecko from sub-Saharan Africa

The tropical house gecko (Hemidactylus mabouia), also called the cosmopolitan house gecko, is a species of lizard in the family Gekkonidae. The species is native to sub-Saharan Africa. However, it is also found in North, Central and South America and the Caribbean, where it has been inadvertently introduced by humans.

== Description ==
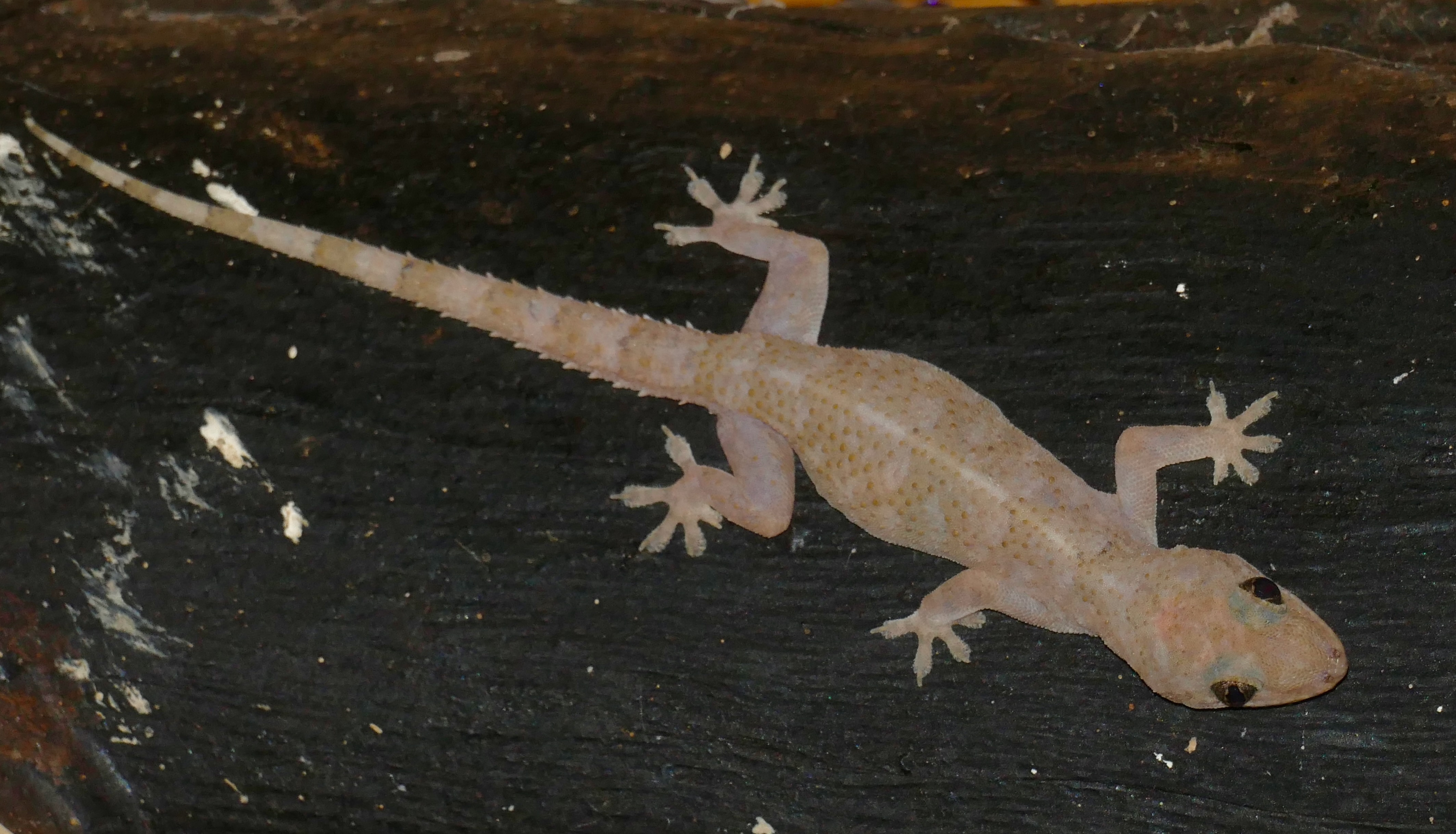
H. mabouia, Lower Sabie, Kruger National Park, South Africa

The tropical house gecko has an average total length of 10–12.7 centimetres (3.9–5.0 in) (including tail) and an average mass of 4.6 grams (0.16 oz). Females are on average somewhat larger than males, with the male average snout-to-vent length (SVL) being 51.56 mm (2.030 in) and the female average SVL being 54.47 mm (2.144 in). Normally coloured in black and brown bands, this gecko can slowly change its colour based on its ambient temperature and lighting; its scales vary in colour from dark brown to light grey. The tropical house gecko bears particularly scaly lamellae on the underside of its toes, enabling it to grip onto vertical surfaces.

== Diet ==
The diet of H. mabouia is varied, and includes animals such as isopods, centipedes, spiders, scorpions, cockroaches, beetles, moths, flies, mosquitoes, snails, slugs, frogs, anoles, other geckos and blind snakes, with the most important element being Orthoptera species.

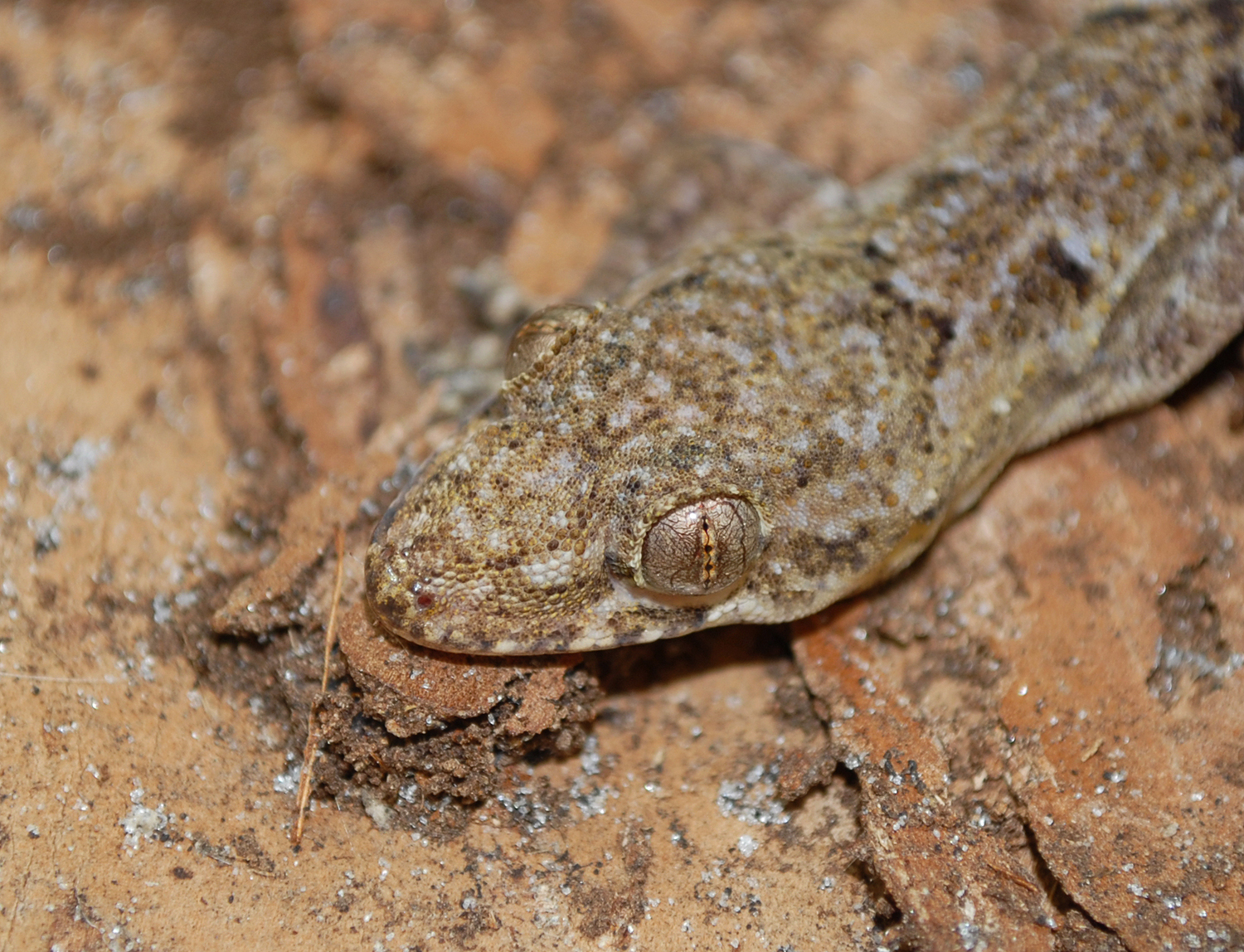
Close up of a tropical house gecko in Florida

== Vocalisation ==
As with many gecko species, H. mabouia has the ability to vocalise. Its vocalisations range from quiet peeps to rapid short squeaking sounds. The vocalisations may be heard most easily on a quiet night when sitting near an open window.

== Habitat ==
The tropical house gecko can be found predominantly in urban locations.

== Behaviour ==
The tropical house gecko is mainly nocturnal and a voracious hunter of nocturnal flying and crawling insects. It has learned to wait near outside wall-mounted lighting fixtures so as to catch the insects that are drawn to the light.

== Human impact ==
In some Caribbean cultures it is considered good luck to have a tropical house gecko residing in one's home, and eats household insect pests. However, the faeces of the tropical house gecko are approximately 5 mm (0.20 in) long, 2 mm (0.079 in) wide, and dark brown (almost black) in colour. The gecko will usually confine its faeces to one area of a home, but this can present as a problem to humans if that area of the home happens to include a pale-coloured carpet, drapes, or any other easily stained surface. The stains are not easily removed, and the droppings have to be physically scooped up as well.

Despite actually being harmless, the common house gecko or "wood slave" is considered by some in Trinidad and Tobago to be a bad omen, and to have a poisonous touch.
