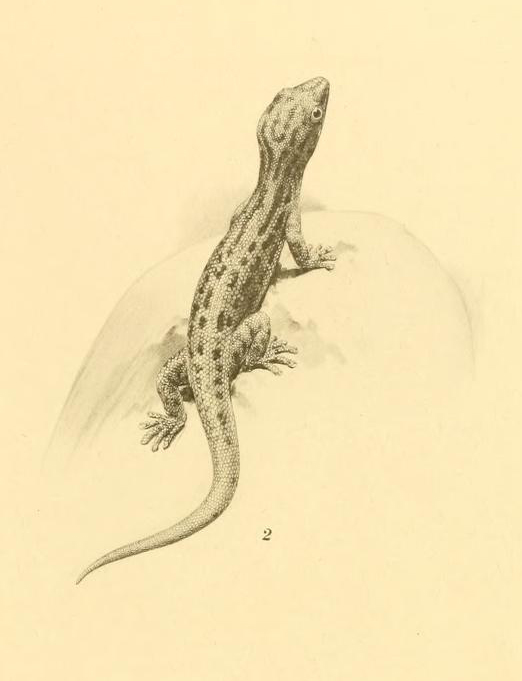
- 1921 illustration from St. Kitts
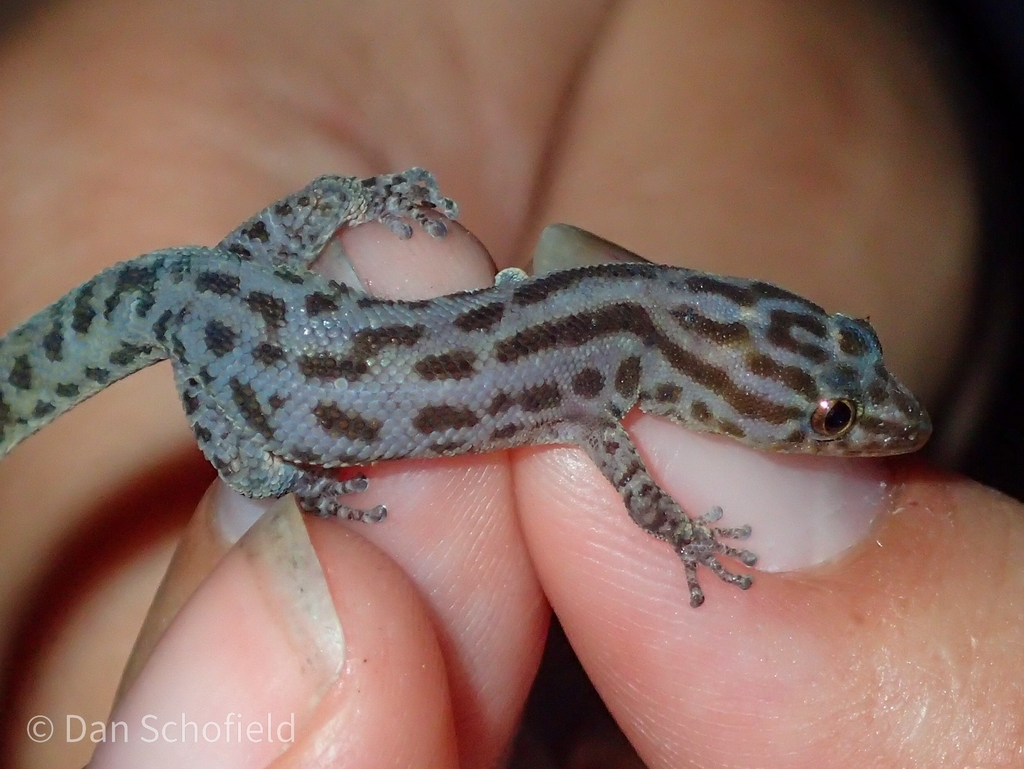
- First record from Saba

Conservation status
- Least Concern (IUCN 3.1)

Scientific classification
- Kingdom: Animalia
- Phylum: Chordata
- Class: Reptilia
- Order: Squamata
- Suborder: Gekkota
- Family: Sphaerodactylidae
- Genus: Sphaerodactylus
- Species: S. sputator

Binomial name
- Sphaerodactylus sputator (Sparrman, 1784)

Synonyms
- Lacerta sputator Sparrman 1784; Sphaerodactylus pictus Garman, 1887

= Island least gecko =

Species of lizard

The island least gecko (Sphaerodactylus sputator) is a species of lizard belonging to the family Sphaerodactylidae, the least geckos or sphaeros. This gecko is endemic to the northern Lesser Antilles in the Caribbean.

== Taxonomy ==
The island least gecko was first formally described in 1784 as Lacerta sputator by the Swedish naturalist Anders Sparrman with its type locality given as Sint Eustatius. In 1830 Johann Georg Wagler proposed the new monospecific genus Sphaerodactylus with L. sputator as its only species, meaning that this species is the type species of Sphaerodactylus by monotypy. This genus was formerly included in the family Gekkonidae but in 1954 Garth Underwood proposed the family Sphaerodactylidae, This family is classified within the infraorder Gekkota the sole extant taxon within the clade Gekkonomorpha of the order Squamata, which includes the lizards and snakes.

== Etymology ==
The island least gecko is the type species of the genus Sphaerodactylus, a combination of the Greek sphaira, meaning "a ball", or sphairion, which means "a little ball", with dactylos, meaning "finger", seemingly an allusion to round tips to the toes. The specific name, sputator, means "spitter" in Latin.

== Description ==
The island least gecko is a relatively large species of Sphaerodactylus with a background colour of light brown marked with white crossbands with brown edges and dark brown blotches or brown longitudinal stripes.

== Distribution and habitat ==
The island least gecko is endemic to the northern islands of the Lesser Antilles, on Anguilla, St Kitts and Nevis, Saint Martin, Saint Barthélemy and Sint Eustatius, and their associated satellite islands. It was rediscovered on Saba in 2021, after last being recorded in 1963.
