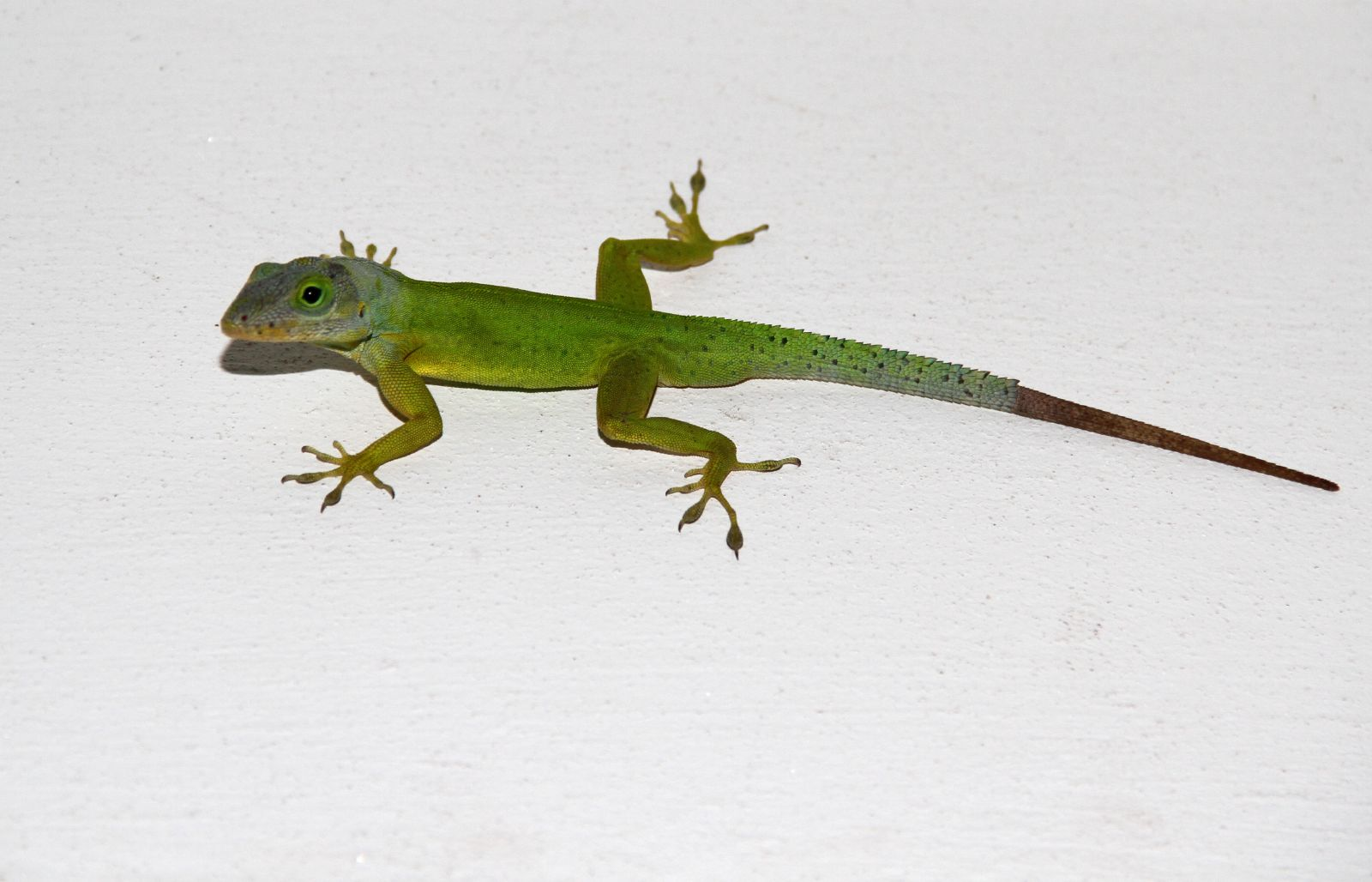

Conservation status
- Least Concern (IUCN 3.1)

Scientific classification
- Kingdom: Animalia
- Phylum: Chordata
- Class: Reptilia
- Order: Squamata
- Suborder: Iguania
- Family: Dactyloidae
- Genus: Anolis
- Species: A. bimaculatus

Binomial name
- Anolis bimaculatus (Sparrman, 1784)

Synonyms
- Lacerta bimaculata Sparrman, 1784; Xiphosurus bimaculata — Fitzinger, 1826; Ctenonotus bimaculatus — Fitzinger, 1843; Anolis antiquae Barbour, 1915; Anolis barbudensis Barbour, 1923

= Anolis bimaculatus =

Panther anole

Species of lizard

Anolis bimaculatus, the panther anole, also known as the St. Eustatius anole or Statia Bank tree anole, is a species of anole lizard that is endemic to the Lesser Antilles in the Caribbean. It is found in Sint Eustatius and Saint Kitts and Nevis islands. It was first described by Anders Erikson Sparrman in 1784 based on a holotype from Sint Eustatius held at the Naturhistoriska riksmuseet.

== Taxonomy ==
Anolis bimaculatus was first formally described by Anders Erikson Sparrman in 1784 as Lacerta bimaculata from Sint Eustatius based on a holotype held at the Naturhistoriska riksmuseet (NRM) at Stockholm. The species was subsequently placed in the genera Cordylus by Friedrich Albrecht Anton Meyer in 1795, and Xiphosurus (1826), and Ctenonotus (1843) by Leopold Fitzinger. Paul Johannes Brühl described as Ctenodon bimaculatum in 1886. Thomas Barbour was the first to place it under the genera Anolis, when he described it as Anolis antiquae. Subsequently, it had developed various synonyms such as Anolis mayeri and Anolis barbudensis. Ernest Edward Williams and Garth Underwood described it as Anolis bimaculatus in 1959. Though it was re-classified under different synonyms later, it was finally described under the same name in 2022. The species is currently placed in the family Anolidae under the order Squamata.

The species name bimaculatus is derived from Latin, "bi" meaning two and "maculatus" meaning spotted, referring to the two-spotted pattern of the species. The generic name Ctenonotus is derived from Greek, with "ktenos" meaning comb and "notos" meaning back, an allusion to the large crest in males of the type. It is commonly known as the panther anole, Statia Bank tree anole, or St. Eustatius anole.

== Description ==
Males reach a snout-to-vent length of 123 mm (4.8 in), with the colorization depending on size. Larger males have a bright green to yellow-green coat, with grey, brown, or black spots on the top, with a dull white to yellow to light green skin on the ventral side. The dewlap is small with yellow or orange colorization with whitish scales. Females and juvenile males are smaller and duller in color than adult males. It has a tail length approximately 2.0 to 2.5 times the snout-to-vent length. It has extended toe pads with lamellae to help the animal grip on to surfaces.

== Distribution ==
The anole is endemic to the Lesser Antilles in the Caribbean, and occurs on the islands of Sint Eustatius and Saint Kitts and Nevis. It is relatively common and widespread up to an elevation of 300 m (980 ft) in the islands.

== Ecology and behaviour ==
The anole is a diurnal and arboreal species. It is non-venomous and usually consumes insects, which it subdues by mechanically striking it. It has a well developed color-sensitive eyesight that helps in tracking prey. It also uses its eyes along with movements to its head and dewlap, to communicate with other members of its species. It is oviparous, and has been noted to interbreed with other species of the genus such as Anolis leachi in captivity.

== See also ==
- List of Anolis lizards
