= Saint-Barthélemy French =

French dialect of Saint-Barthélemy in the Caribbean

- Patois Saint-Barth
- Native to: St. Barts & St. Thomas
- Native speakers: (500–700 cited 1997)
- Language family: Indo-European: Italic; Latino-Faliscan; Latinic; Romance; Italo-Western; Western; Gallo-Iberian; Gallo-Romance; Gallo-Rhaetian?; Arpitan–Oïl; Oïl; Francien zone; French; Saint-Barthélemy French

Language codes
- ISO 639-3: –
- Glottolog: None
- IETF: fr-BL

Saint-Barthélemy French or St. Barth Patois (French: patois Saint-Barth, pronounced [patwa sɛ̃ baʁt]) is the dialect of French spoken on the western end of the French island of Saint-Barthélemy. It is regarded as the oldest dialect of French in the West Indies that is still spoken and has been considered a precursor to French creoles in the Caribbean. Despite its small size and population, St. Barts is home to four unique vernaculars: St. Barth Patois, St. Barth Creole, Saline French and Gustavian English. It resembles other colloquial French varieties in the New World such as Canadian French, Cajun, and Saint Pierre and Miquelon French.

In 1997 it was estimated that Patois had between 500 and 700 speakers. The number of speakers is declining, but it is considered a valued marker of identity on the island with a few efforts to maintain it.

St. Barth Patois is concentrated in the quartiers of Flamands, Colombier, Corossol, Public, and Anse de Cayes, all in the Sous le Vent Parish. Towards the center of the island, Patois gives away to Standard French. A daughter dialect is also spoken in the Carenage community on Saint Thomas, brought in by immigrants from St. Barths.

== Background ==
Between 1630 and 1660, French colonists arrived throughout the Antilles, with most of Saint-Barthélemy's early settlers arriving from Saint Christopher. This consisted of a mix of planters, slaves, and engagés, poor white indentured servants. Unlike plantation economies elsewhere in the Caribbean, Saint Barthélemy remained sparsely populated and economically marginal, with a small, largely self-sufficient rural population. Most of the planters eventually left and after emancipation, most of the former-slaves left. The St. Barths were singled out as "peasant-colonists," in contrast to the "planter-colonists" on the other islands. The settlers mainly drew from the western provinces of France, though a popular notion among the St. Barths is that the majority came from Normandy.

Going into 1788 as a Swedish colony, the island's population had grown rapidly with residents in Gustavia primarily consisting of Frenchmen, Englishmen, and Swedes, though diverse with several other Europeans like Dutch, Danes, and Spaniards also present. Gustavia was linguistically diverse, though English was the most common language. Sweden had expected Swedish instruction on the colony, but it was met with resistance from the English speakers. Swedish had become extinct on the island by 1862. In the rural parts of the island, French was the primary language. Axel Theodor Goës, a doctor on the Saint-Barthélemy between 1865 and 1870 described the local French as "freely and easy to understand and which dated to the time of Louis XIV."

=== Development of St. Barth Patois ===
The Sous le Vent and Au Vent Parishes of the island are separated by topography which lent to the clear cut separation of St. Barth Patois and St. Barth Creole. Although both varieties ultimately derive from 17th-century French, they evolved under different demographic and contact conditions. Au Vent had a relatively higher concentration of enslaved Africans and their descendants. This environment fostered sustained contact between French-speaking settlers and African populations, contributing to the development of a French-based creole. In addition, the local men commonly traveled to other islands for work and cross-quartiers marriages were also more common. Locals in the Sous le Vent Parish were more conservative and the social isolation preserved subdialects of Patois in the neighboring quartiers.

=== On St. Thomas ===
In the mid-1800s families from St. Barth had migrated to St. Thomas, settling in Carenage, now known as Frenchtown, and in Hull Bay. Prior to the American purchase of the Danish West Indies, immigration was much easier for the St. Barths, with some being dropped off on deserted St. Thomas beaches. Triggered by successive droughts on Saint-Barthélemy, immigrants came from both the Sous le Vent and Au Vent communities, but each settled in different areas of St. Thomas. Creole-speaking, Au Vent men found work as farmers on estates in Northside while the Patios-speaking Sous le Vent families settled in the fishing community of Carenage, now known as Frenchtown. The St. Barths kept to themselves and children were sent to parochial schools, helping maintain French on the island.

== Phonology ==
The phonetics and phonology of St. Barth Patois reflects its origins in early modern French, while retaining a number of conservative features not present in standard French:

- A rhotic that is weaker than the uvular trill of Standard French, described as "a very light uvular trilled [r]" and has a variety of post-vocalic realizations; after [e] it is fully realized while it tends to disappear after back vowels, père [pɛr] "father" and porter "carry" [pote] (Standard French [pɛʁ] and [pɔʁ.te])
- The voiced and voiceless fricatives tch [tʃ] and dj [dʒ] appear in a few words, particularly in the frequent word tcheul "which" (French quel)
- Final consonants are pronounced in Patois, mainly in monosyllabic words, such as in trop [trop] "too" and nuit [nwit] "night" (Standard French [tʁo] and [nɥi])
- Final consonants clusters, except [sk] are reduced, notre [not] "our" and triste [tris] "sad" (Standard French [nɔtʁ] and [tʁist])
- A lack of distinction between [e] and [ɛ] though they are in "complementary distribution" with [e] word finally and [ɛ] elsewhere
- There are three distinct nasal vowels [ã], [õ], and [ẽ]
- Initial [h] is maintained and common
- The older pronunciation of the diphthong of oi [we] instead standard of [wa]; poisson [pwesõ] "fish" and moi [mwe] "me"; this originated as a mesolectal form in western France
- Liaison patterns that are also common in other French vernaculars (ex. le lwil [lə lwil], Standard French l'huile [l ɥil])
- A notable shortening in St. Barth is [na] which is equivalent to Standard French il y a/ il y en a "there is/are"
- The preverbal partitive pronoun en has become fused to the verb avoir and functions in all forms: [nave] "there were," [nore] "there will be," [navwɛr], the infinitive form
- The impersonal subject il is generally deleted, although [i na] is grammatical; the impersonal il was noted as being absent in 16th-century French
- In some cases there is stress on the penultimate syllable which results in a long penultimate vowel: matin [maːtẽ] "morning", bateau [baːto] "boat"

=== Saint Thomas French features ===
The Saint Thomas French dialect has the same features, but the following innovations:

- The rhotic is less relaized than in St. Barth Patois
- The voiced and voiceless fricatives tch [tʃ] and dj [dʒ] are common
- [v] is weakly articulated and becomes [w] in between vowels
- There are nine oral vowels, though there is a growing lack of distinction between [e] and [ɛ]
- There are five nasal vowels with a tendency of merging between them
- Liaison is more generalized (ex. anoli/zanoli "lizard", œ lalé "they went")
- Frequent emphatic stress, an influence from English, in contrast to standard word-final and phrase-final stress

== Lexicon ==
The lexicon and semantic structures of St. Barth Patois is not much different than that of Standard French. There are some regularizations such la faiseuse de pain "maker of bread" instead of la bouangère. There are few semantic distinctions that are not functional in Patois, such as the difference between savoir "to know" and connaître "to know/be familiar with", with only connaître used in St. Barth Patois. Likewise quitter "to leave" and laisser "to leave/permit" have merged semantically and only quitter is used. Some archaic terms used include la rigoise "whip," resenaller "to return," ardériver "to turn around," charier "to carry," and krier "to call, to name."

Though the Norman heritage on the island is overestimated, there is some unique vocabulary from Norman (aplés "a type of fishnet," breuille "entrails," varvotte "filth," amique "when"), that does not appear in other varieties of the New World. This does suggest a stronger influence from Normandy, though it can be difficult to assess since French and Norman form a continuum. St. Barth Patois also uses [you] "house," which replaces chez. This is a regional word from northwest France and has a more general locative meaning than chez.

Non-French words account for less than 1% of the unique vocabulary of which most are nouns for local fish and plants. The influences of other languages on Saint Thomas French, particularly English, is more pronounced than in St. Barth Patois. Though English loans exist, they're rarely used in Patois and mostly confined to the speech of older men who have lived on other islands. These include, [bwai] "boy," [loif loin] "life-line," [bukit] "bucket," [blakoi] "black eye." The [oi] diphthong in some of these words is similar to High Tide, of which Gustavian English has a similar pattern.

St. Barth Creole and Patois share vocabulary for many local items: fig "banana," hammac "hammock," gombo "okra," morne "hill," and zignam "yam." These words originate from a mix of Arawak, African, and other European languages. St. Barth Patois also took in Creole vocabulary used to refer to common items that replaced French terms:

- [ãnpil] "much, a lot, plenty," replaced beaucoup, and comes from French phrase en pile "in a pile," a term that originated in Saint-Domingue. Haitian Creole uses the same term anpil.
- [pyedbwa] "tree," replaced arbre and comes from French pied de bois "foot of wood." Despite the [pyed] part coming from the French word for "foot," it is modified to specify what kind of tree or plant, i.e. [pyedkoko] "coconut tree," [pyedroz] "rosebush", [pyeziñam] "yam vine." It exists in Antillean Creole as pyébwa and in Haitian Creole as pyebwa, with the same modifying element, i.e. pye kokoye.
- [moun] "people" from monde "world" and replaced les gens. Haitian and Antillean Creole use the same term.
- [oti kə] "when," replaced quand.
