= Daniel Montbars =

French pirate

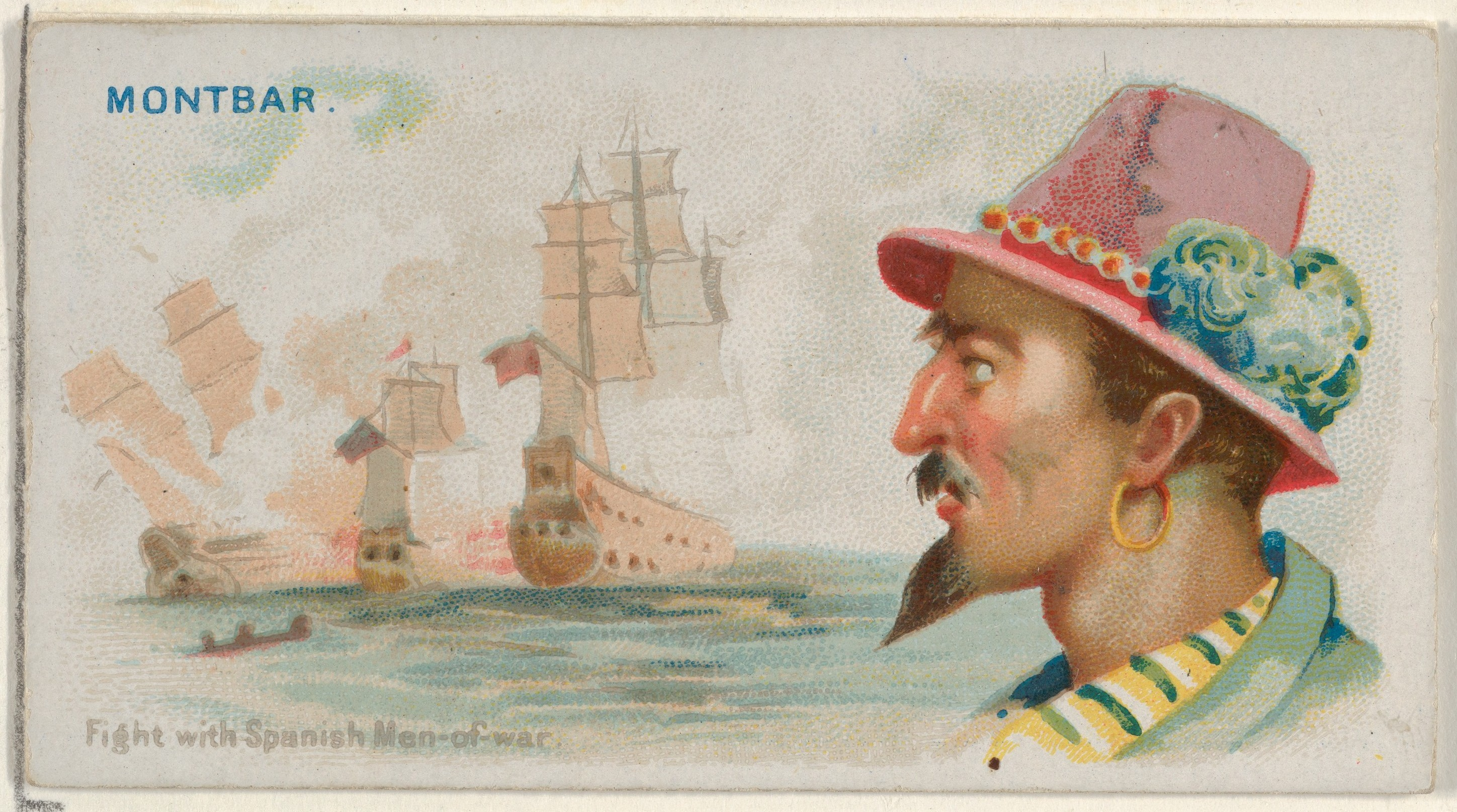
- Born: 1645; Languedoc, France
- Died: 1707? West Indies
- Piratical career
- Nickname: Montbars the Exterminator; Montbars the Destroyer
- Type: Buccaneer
- Allegiance: France
- Years active: 1660s–1670s
- Rank: Captain
- Base of operations: Saint Barthélemy
- Battles: War of Devolution

Daniel Montbars (1645–1707?), better known as Montbars the Exterminator, was a 17th-century French buccaneer. For several years, he was known as one of the most violent buccaneers active against the Spanish during the mid-17th century. His reputation as a fierce enemy of the Spanish Empire was matched only by François l'Olonnais and Roche Braziliano.

== Biography ==
Montbars was born to a wealthy family in Languedoc around 1645. He was well educated and raised as a gentleman. According to popular legend, Montbars' legendary hatred of the Spanish came from reading about the cruelties of the Conquistadors upon the New World, particularly a narrative describing atrocities carried out against the native Indians, written by Las Casas. Leaving his native France in 1667, he embarked at Le Havre to serve with his uncle in the Royal French Navy during the War of Devolution against Spain.

He accompanied his uncle to the West Indies, where their ship was sunk and the uncle killed near Santo Domingo in a battle with two Spanish warships. His uncle's death served to further his hatred of the Spaniards. Making his way to the pirate haven of Tortuga, he became a buccaneer captain soon afterwards. Montbars distinguished himself during an attack against a Spanish galleon, described by one account:

Montbars led the way to the decks of the enemy, where he carried injury and death; and when submission terminated the contest, his only pleasure seemed to be to contemplate, not the treasures of the vessel, but the number of dead and dying Spaniards, against whom he had vowed a deep and eternal hatred, which he maintained the whole of his life.

He attacked the Spanish settlements on the coast of Mexico, Cuba and Puerto Rico. He also raided settlements in the Antilles and in Honduras, capturing Vera Cruz and Cartagena. Defending his act of vengeance against the Spaniards, he became known throughout the Spanish Main as "Montbars the Exterminator" for exacting his own cruelties against the Spanish. He looted and set fire to Porto Caballo, San Pedro, Venezuelan Gibraltar and Maricaibo, among other Spanish strongholds, and captured or destroyed numerous other forts and settlements. Although he did not murder in cold blood, as did some of his contemporaries, he gave no quarter to his enemies and was known to torture surviving Spanish soldiers. One of his more infamous methods was to cut open the abdomen of one of his prisoners, extract one end of the large intestine and nail it to a post, then force the man to "dance to his death by beating his backside with a burning log".

Known for having a romantic relationship with Christine Biccah Montauban, daughter of Count Montauban, responsible for the Trade Commission of the Bahamas, and the peacekeeper between the France Government and Buccaneers Brotherhood. In 1690, Christine gave Daniel Montbars a son named Claude Jacques Biccah Montauban Montbars. Christine Biccah Montauban and her son were rescued by Roche Braziliano, a friend and fellow member of Buccaneers Brotherhood, after an attempt of executing Daniel Montbars by the Spanish Fleet. Braziliano placed them harmless in South America.

== Death ==
The circumstances of his death are unrecorded; however, he may have been lost at sea while on one of his voyages in 1707. While more focused on warring against the Spanish, he was said to have amassed a considerable amount of wealth during his career. He and members of his crew reportedly buried their fortune near Anse du Gouverneur or Grande Saline on Saint Barthelemy, although Montbars was said to have died before he could come back for his treasure.

== In popular culture ==
- Montbars is featured in several French dramas, most notably, the 1807 romance novel l'Exterminateur: ou le dernier des flibustiers.
- The character of Red Rackham from The Adventures of Tintin was based on John Rackham and Montbars the Exterminator.
