= Swedish West India Company =

Swedish chartered company

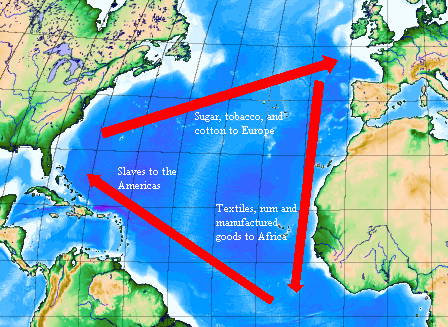
Depiction of the classical model of triangular trade.

The Swedish West India Company (Swedish: Svenska Västindiska Kompaniet) was a Swedish chartered company which was based in the West Indies. It was the main operator in the Swedish slave trade during its existence.

Between 1786 and 1805, the company operated from the Swedish island of Saint-Barthélemy. The company was a private enterprise with royal monopoly on all Swedish trade via Saint Barthélemy. Three quarters of profits went to the company, one quarter to the Swedish state.

== Company operations ==
The West India Company was founded on October 31, 1786, on the proposal of Swedish Secretary of State John Liljencrantz. According to his proposal, the company would be chartered on January 1, 1787, for a period of 15 years. The company sought shares from English businessmen, and King Gustav III of Sweden owned 10% of the shares, making him the largest single shareholder. Although the company was headquartered in Stockholm, the main trading activities took place in Gustavia on the island of St. Barthélemy. The main purpose of the company was not only to open trade between Sweden and the remaining forces of New Sweden in the Caribbean and North America, but also to monopolize that trade.

Because the West India Company also interfered in colonial affairs and violated the colonial administration's power to profit from trade, the two sides had many disputes. The profits from the trade were divided, with the King receiving one-quarter and the West India Company three-quarters. Section 14 of the company's charter stipulated that it had the right to engage in the slave trade between Africa and the Caribbean. It was a triangular trade: African slaves were shipped to the Caribbean, Caribbean sugar, cotton, and tobacco were shipped to Europe, and European cloth, weapons, and spirits were shipped to Africa.

== History ==
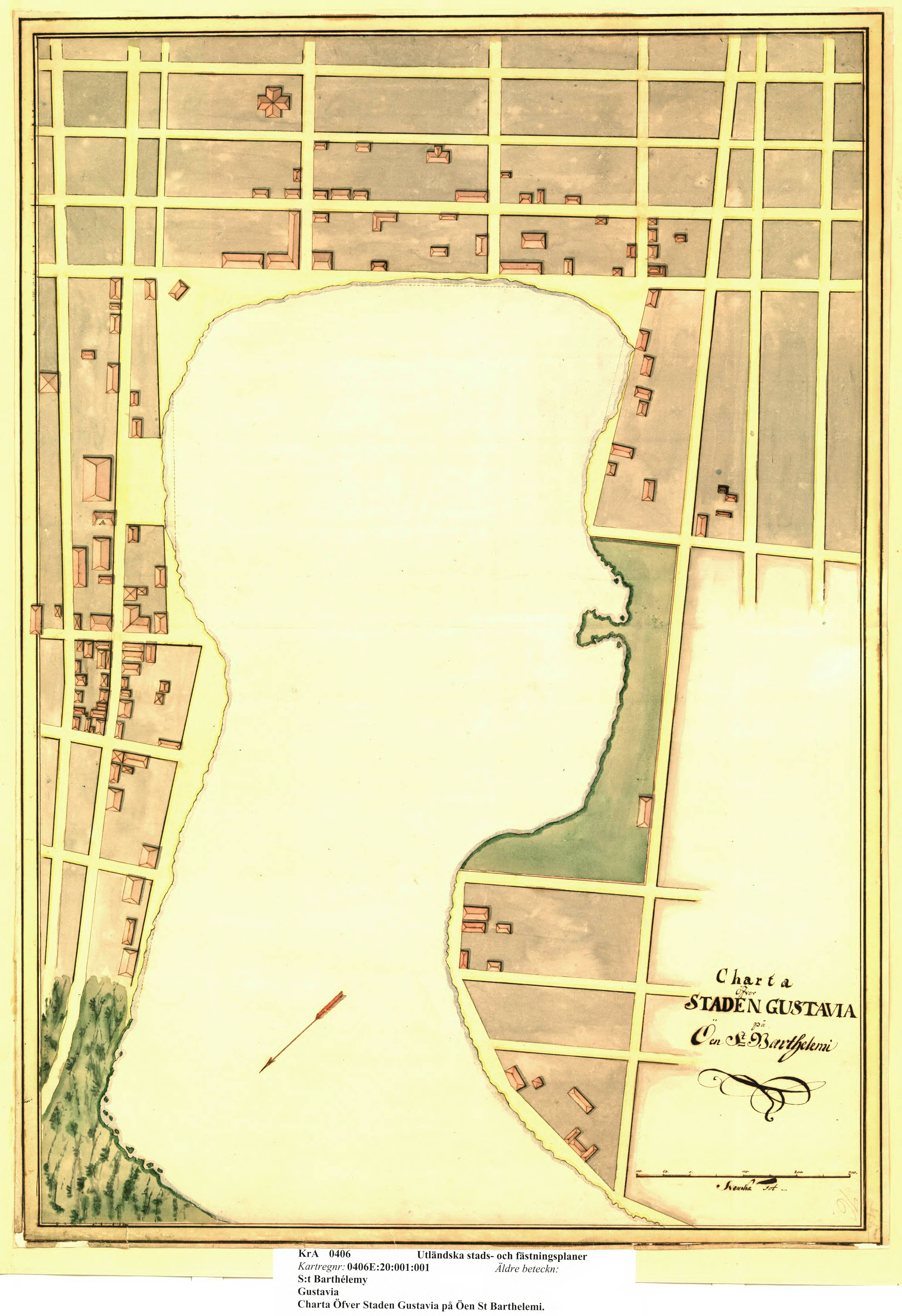
Map of Gustavia in St. Barthélemy, c. 1796

Saint-Barthélemy was designated a free port in 1785. After the West India Company was founded in 1787, it was preparing to explore Africa for the first time. However, due to the outbreak of war between Sweden and Russia in 1788, the company's merchants and clerks could only trade privately.

The island of St. Barthélemy was for a time a hub for the slave trade, only a small proportion of which were transported on Swedish ships. According to Swedish government archives, between the 17th and 19th centuries, Swedish ships transported slaves only about 50 times, while there were 34,941 slave transportations across the Atlantic at that time. There are 10 ships in the archive registered as Swedish, and four of them have Swedish origins marked on their hulls. Since Swedish ships accounted for only 0.02% of all slave transport ships and 0.14% of the total number of slave transports, Sweden only participated in a small part of the slave trade. Therefore, the West India Company did not list slave trade records separately.

Shipping began to decline in 1794, prompting the West India Company to request financial assistance from the state. Although it applied for a trade patent extension in 1801, there were only a few shipping operations at that time. The company's commercial activities were severely interrupted during the British occupation of Saint Barthélemy, when all its goods were confiscated. The financial situation worsened further when an embezzlement case arose the same year, in which the company's agent on the island, Carl Dreijer, had accumulated a debt to the company amounting to a third of its annual income. The patent was finally revoked in 1805, with duties and other revenues going directly to the government, signaling that the West India Company's golden period of free trade had passed. On May 22, 1805, the Swedish West India Company was officially dissolved.

== Other Swedish chartered companies ==
The company should not be confused with the 17th-century Swedish South Company, also called New Sweden Company, best known for establishing New Sweden in the Delaware region (or much of today's Delaware Valley), which operated between 1638 and 1655.

== See also ==
- List of trading companies
- Swedish colony of Saint Barthélemy
