= Marigot =

The French name Marigot is given to several places in the Caribbean:

- Marigot, Dominica, a village in Dominica
- Marigot, Grenada, a village in Grenada
- Marigot, Saint Martin, the largest settlement on the French side of Saint Martin (Saint-Martin)
- Marigot, Saint Barthélemy, a village in Saint Barthélemy
- Marigot Bay, Saint Lucia
- Le Marigot, a canton in Martinique's La Trinité arrondissement
- Marigot, Sud-Est, a beach commune east of Jacmel, Haiti
