= Carl Dreijer =

Swedish merchant and planter (1770–1802)

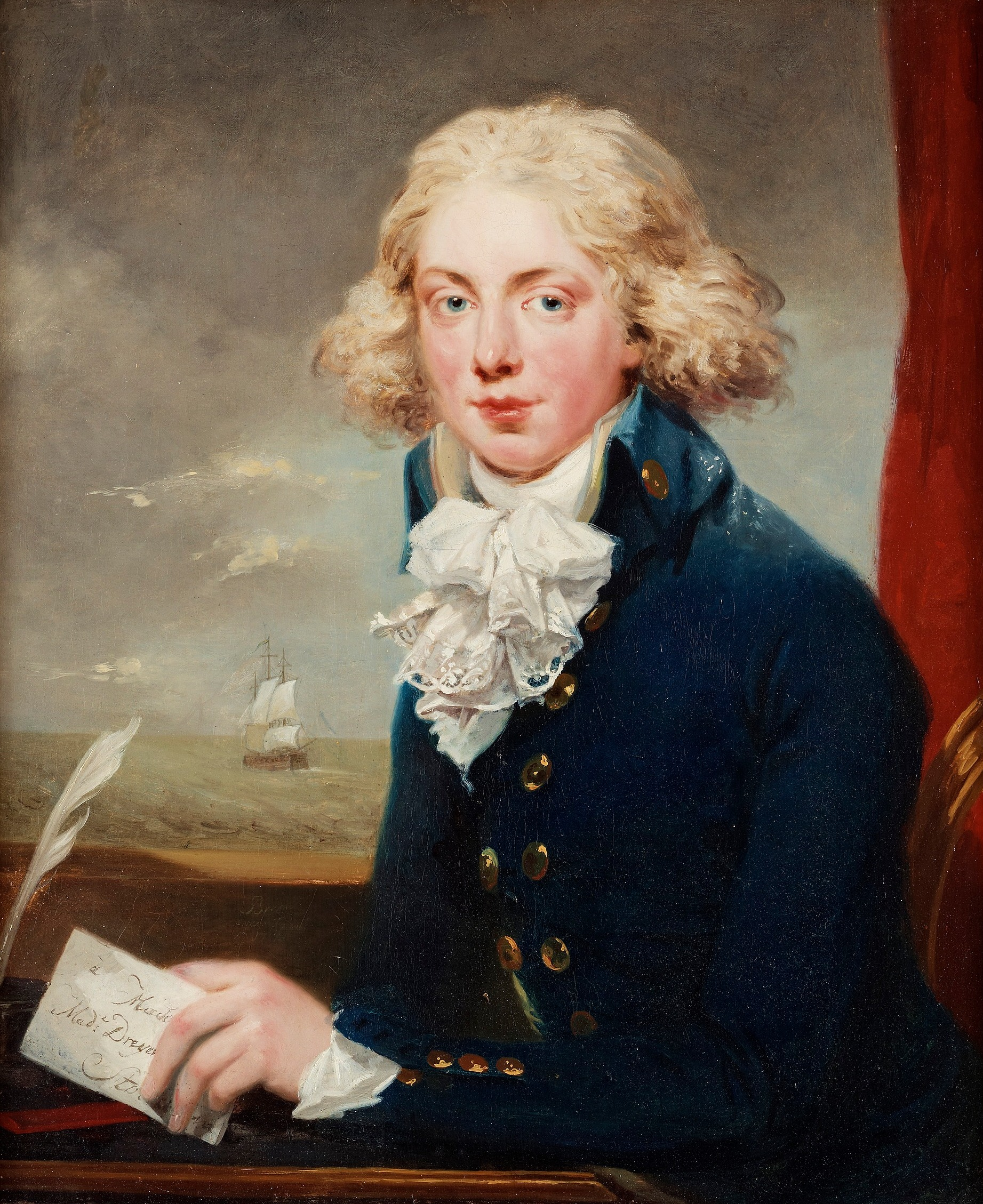
Portrait by Carl Fredrik von Breda, 1791

Carl Dreijer (May 31, 1770 – October 23, 1802) was a Swedish merchant and planter active in the Swedish colony of Saint Barthélemy during the late 18th and early 19th centuries.

== Biography ==
Dreijer was born in 1770 in Stockholm as the son of the merchant and politician Johan Dreijer and his wife Anna Margareta Zelling. He was sent by his father at an early age to London to assist with his father's business there.

In 1794 Dreijer became an employee of the Swedish West India Company, acting as an commercial agent in Gustavia. While settling on the island, he built a villa in Anse de Flamands. In the census from 1796, he was listed as the head of a household consisting of ten people, which included three slaves. Dreijer had also been involved in Freemasonry on the island, becoming a member of the island's chapter in 1797. He also served at times as a member of the court in Gustavia. Between 1796 and 1801, he was responsible for the company's business on the island. At this time, piracy was a constant threat to the company's commercial activities, and Dreijer made several appeals to Stockholm about the need to reinforce the island's defences. Prior to the British occupation of Saint Barthélemy, Dreijer had been a member of the war council in Gustavia and had voted in favour of surrendering to the British.

In 1801, his career took a twist when he became the subject of an embezzlement case that amounted to 90,288 riksdalers in debt to the Swedish West India Company, which has been described as the largest single catastrophe under the company's first charter.

Dreijer, however, fell unexpectedly ill and retreated to his plantation, where he died in 1802 before any charges were laid against him. He was buried on the island. He never married, but at the time of his death it was mentioned that he had a son with one of his housekeepers, a slave named Betty. As the child was not acknowledged by him, both mother and son remained in slavery after his death.
