= Vitet =

- Quartier
- The quartier of Vitet marked 34.
- Coordinates: 17°54′12″N 62°48′25″W
- Country: France
- Overseas collectivity: Saint Barthélemy

Vitet is a quartier of Saint Barthélemy in the Caribbean. It is located in the eastern-central part of the island.
