= Grand Cul-de-Sac =

- Quartier
- The quartier of Grand Cul-de-Sac marked 35.
- Coordinates: 17°54′29″N 62°48′21″W
- Country: France
- Overseas collectivity: Saint Barthélemy

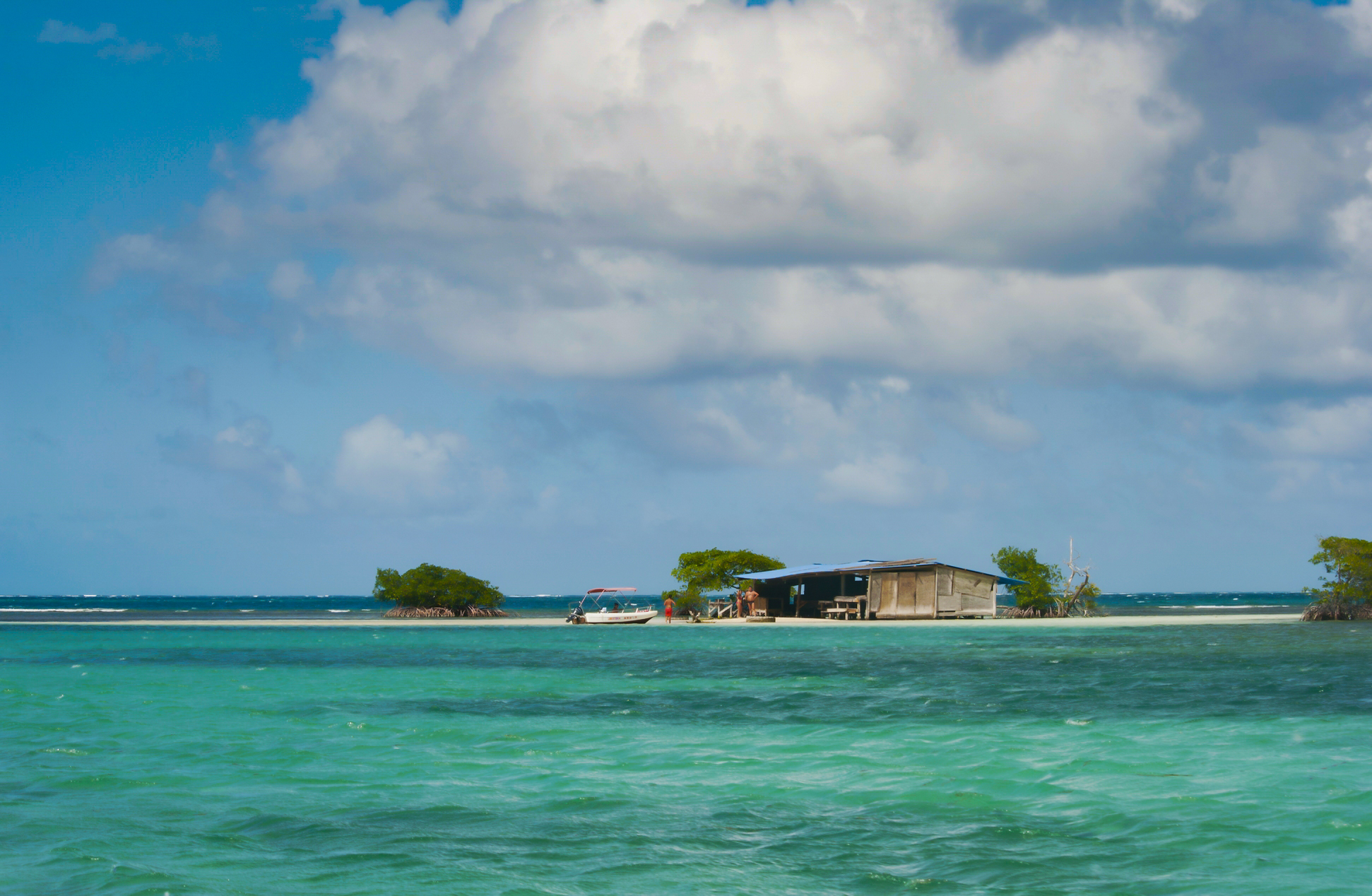
Grand Cul-de-sac

Grand Cul-de-Sac (French pronunciation: [ɡʁɑ̃ ky d(ə) sak]) is a quartier of Saint Barthélemy, Caribbean. It is located in the northeastern part of the island.

== Wildlife ==
The Grand Cul-de-Sac pond is reserved for the reproduction of birds and crabs.
