= Le Palidor =

- Quartier
- The quartier of Le Palidor marked 10.
- Coordinates: 17°54′37″N 62°50′52″W
- Country: France
- Overseas collectivity: Saint Barthélemy

Le Palidor (French pronunciation: [lə palidɔʁ]) is a quartier of Saint Barthélemy in the Caribbean. It is located in the northwestern part of the island.
