= Mont Jean =

- Quartier
- The quartier of Mont Jean marked 37.
- Coordinates: 17°54′56″N 62°48′35″W
- Country: France
- Overseas collectivity: Saint Barthélemy

Mont Jean (French pronunciation: [mɔ̃ ʒɑ̃]) is a quartier of Saint Barthélemy in the Caribbean. It is located in the northeastern part of the island.
