= Merlette =

- Quartier
- The quartier of Merlette marked 6.
- Coordinates: 17°54′58″N 62°51′6″W
- Country: France
- Overseas collectivity: Saint Barthélemy

Merlette (French pronunciation: [mɛʁlɛt]) is a quartier of Saint Barthélemy in the Caribbean. It is located in the northwestern part of the island.
