= Anse des Lézards =

- Quartier
- The quartier of Anse des Lézards marked 8.
- Coordinates: 17°54′58″N 62°50′40″W
- Country: France
- Overseas collectivity: Saint Barthélemy

Anse des Lézards (French pronunciation: [ɑ̃s de lezaʁ]) is a quartier of Saint Barthélemy in the Caribbean. It is located in the northwestern part of the island.

The name of the quartier was likely derived from the single owner of the area before 1788, after which the land was divided into several shares.
