= Camaruche =

- Quartier
- The quartier of Camaruche marked 30.
- Coordinates: 17°54′20″N 62°48′48″W
- Country: France
- Overseas collectivity: Saint Barthélemy

Camaruche (French pronunciation: [kamaʁyʃ]) is a quartier of Saint Barthélemy in the Caribbean. It is located in the eastern-central part of the island.
