= Terre-Neuve, Saint Barthélemy =

Terre-Neuve
- Quartier
- The quartier of Terre-Neuve, Saint Barthélemy marked 3.
- Coordinates: 17°54′55″N 62°51′14″W
- Country: France
- Overseas collectivity: Saint Barthélemy

Terre-Neuve (French pronunciation: [tɛʁ nœv]) is a quartier of Saint Barthélemy in the Caribbean. It is located in the northwestern part of the island.
