= Barrière des Quatre Vents =

- Quartier
- The quartier of Barrière des Quatres Vents marked 29.
- Coordinates: 17°54′34″N 62°48′59″W
- Country: France
- Overseas collectivity: Saint Barthélemy

Barrière des Quatre Vents (French pronunciation: [baʁjɛʁ de katʁ vɑ̃]) is a quartier of Saint Barthélemy in the Caribbean. It is located in the northeastern part of the island.
