= L'Hymne à Saint-Barthélemy =

Unofficial anthem of Saint Barthélemy

L'Hymne a St. Barthélemy
- Territorial anthem of Saint Barthélemy
- Lyrics: Isabelle Massart Déravin
- Music: Michael Valenti, 1999

Audio sample
- file; help

"L'Hymne à St.-Barthélemy" ("The Hymn to Saint Barthelemy") is the unofficial song of the French overseas collectivity of Saint Barthélemy. It was created in 1999 by Michael Valenti, with lyrics by Isabelle Massart Déravin. As a French overseas collectivity, the official national anthem is "La Marseillaise".

In 1999, shortly after Valenti's arrival in St. Barthélemy (also known as St. Barts) from New York and his appointment as director of the island’s choir, Chorale de Bons Choeur, Charles Darden noticed that, despite St. Barts being a French overseas collectivity, the culture on the island is different from that of France. The French national anthem was (and still is) the official national anthem of the island, but the French anthem’s theme of bloody revolution and rebellion is different than the peaceful, laid-back climate of St. Barthélemy. Darden decided an anthem reflecting the history of the island was more in order as a national anthem for St. Barts.

After mentioning to his choir about his wish for a poem about St. Barts to be composed, the choir recommended that member Isabelle Déravin could write a poem. Déravin, fluent in both French and English, composed the poem, making the rhythm symmetrical for the music that was to come, as well as the English translation. Later, on a trip to New York where he was playing the piano, Darden was introduced to Michael Valenti who is an accomplished Broadway composer, and Darden asked that he compose the music. Finally, in December of that year, the anthem was ready, and was performed for the first time on the island by Valenti and the Chorale de Bons Choeur. The anthem continues to be used as a local anthem played at appropriate occasions for local dignitaries.
