= Devet, Saint Barthélemy =

Devet
- Quartier
- The quartier of Devet, Saint Barthélemy marked 33.
- Coordinates: 17°54′7″N 62°47′52″W
- Country: France
- Overseas collectivity: Saint Barthélemy

Devet is a quartier of Saint Barthélemy in the Caribbean. It is located in the eastern part of the island.
