= Toiny =

- Quartier
- The quartier of Toiny marked 32.
- Coordinates: 17°53′50″N 62°48′0″W
- Country: France
- Overseas collectivity: Saint Barthélemy

Toiny is a quartier of Saint Barthélemy in the Caribbean. It is located in the southeastern part of the island.
