= Grande Vigie =

- Quartier
- The quartier of Grande Vigie marked 4.
- Coordinates: 17°54′41″N 62°51′39″W
- Country: France
- Overseas collectivity: Saint Barthélemy

Grande Vigie (French pronunciation: [ɡʁɑ̃d viʒi]) is a quartier of Saint Barthélemy in the Caribbean. It is located in the northwestern part of the island.
