= Pointe Milou =

- Quartier
- The quartier of Pointe Milou marked 36.
- Coordinates: 17°54′57″N 62°48′56″W
- Country: France
- Overseas collectivity: Saint Barthélemy

Pointe Milou (French pronunciation: [pwɛ̃t milu]) is a quartier of Saint Barthélemy in the Caribbean. It is located in the northeastern part of the island.
