= Le Château, Saint Barthélemy =

Le Château
- Quartier
- The quartier of Le Château, Saint Barthélemy marked 14.
- Coordinates: 17°54′22″N 62°50′29″W
- Country: France
- Overseas collectivity: Saint Barthélemy

Le Château (French pronunciation: [lə ʃato]) is a quartier of Saint Barthélemy in the Caribbean. It is located in the northern part of the island. The airport runway is located nearby.

== See also ==
- Gustaf III Airport
