= Petite Saline =

- Quartier
- The quartier of Petite Saline marked 27.
- Coordinates: 17°54′4″N 62°49′16″W
- Country: France
- Overseas collectivity: Saint Barthélemy

Petite Saline (French pronunciation: [pətit salin]) is a quartier of Saint Barthélemy in the Caribbean. It is located in the central part of the island.
