= La Grande Montagne =

- Quartier
- The quartier of La Grande Montagne marked 7.
- Coordinates: 17°55′9″N 62°51′3″W
- Country: France
- Overseas collectivity: Saint Barthélemy

La Grande Montagne (French pronunciation: [la ɡʁɑ̃d mɔ̃taɲ]) is a quartier of Saint Barthélemy in the Caribbean. It is located in the northwestern part of the island.
