= Quartier du Roi =

- Quartier
- The quartier of Quartier du Roi marked 13.
- Coordinates: 17°54′28″N 62°50′31″W
- Country: France
- Overseas collectivity: Saint Barthélemy

Quartier du Roi (French pronunciation: [kaʁtje dy ʁwa]) is a quartier of Saint Barthélemy in the Caribbean. It is located in the northwestern part of the island.

The local timezone is called America/St Barthelemy with a UTC offset of about 4 hours behind.
