= Petit Cul-de-Sac =

- Quartier
- The quartier of Petit Cul-de-Sac marked 40.
- Coordinates: 17°54′18″N 62°47′26″W
- Country: France
- Overseas collectivity: Saint Barthélemy

Petit Cul-de-Sac (French pronunciation: [pəti ky də sak]) is a quartier of Saint Barthélemy in the Caribbean. It is located in the extreme eastern part of the island.
