= Au Vent Parish =

Coordinates: 17.9011°N 62.8144°W

Au Vent
- Parish
- Interactive map of Au Vent
- Country: France
- Overseas collectivity: Saint Barthélemy

Au Vent (French pronunciation: [o vɑ̃], "Windward") is a parish of Saint Barthélemy, a French overseas collectivity in the Lesser Antilles of the Caribbean. It is located on the eastern side of the island. It had a population of 4,361 inhabitants in 2022. The economy is dependent on agriculture and livestock rearing.

== History ==
Saint Barthélemy was first settled by Europeans in the 17th century, beginning with the French in 1648, before being sold to Swedish Empire in 1784. It was returned to France in the late 19th century. It was part of Guadeloupe before it was devolved into a separate overseas collectivity of France in February 2007.

== Geography ==
Au Vent is one of the three parishes of Saint Barthélemy, a French overseas collectivity in the Lesser Antilles of the Caribbean. It occupies an area of 11.2 km^{2} (4.3 sq mi). The name "Au Vent" means windward in French, with the geographic distinction based on exposure to the prevailing winds and is located on the eastern part of the island.

== Demographics ==
As per 2022 census, Au Vent parish had a population of 4,361 inhabitants. It increased from a population of 3,721 in 2014.

== Culture and economy ==
The population of Au Vent differed physiologically from the people of Sous le Vent from the other side of the island. Studies indicated that the people from Au Vent were on average shorter and had varying blood group composition. The culture and practices of the parishes also varied significantly. The difference developed due to the historical development of the parishes itself. The island's economy was dependent on cotton and experienced a boom in the 18th century. In the 19th century, due to several natural disasters, immigration stopped and there were severe losses. Au Vent had a flatter terrain, and people started engaging in agriculture and livestock rearing, and owned individual lands, while the people of Sous le Vent had to adopt to community fishing.
