= Saint Barthélemy =

Overseas collectivity of France

Coordinates: 17°54′N 62°50′W

Saint Barthélemy Saint-Barthélemy (French)
- Overseas collectivity of France
- Territorial Collectivity of Saint Barthélemy; Collectivité territoriale de Saint-Barthélemy
- Flag (unofficial) Coat of arms
- Anthem: La Marseillaise ("The Marseillaise")
- Territorial anthem: "L'Hymne à Saint-Barthélemy"
- Location of Saint Barthélemy (circled in red) in the Western Hemisphere
- Sovereign state: France
- Colony established: 1648
- Swedish purchase: 1 July 1784
- Returned to France: 16 March 1878
- Detached from Guadeloupe: 22 February 2007
- Capital and largest city: Gustavia
- Official languages: French
- Recognised regional languages: Saint-Barthélemy French; Antillean Creole; English
- Demonym(s): Barthélemois; Saint-Barth; French
- Government: Devolved parliamentary dependency
  - President of France: Emmanuel Macron
  - Prefect: Cyrille Le Vély
  - President of the Territorial Council: Xavier Lédée
- Legislature: Territorial Council

French Parliament
  - Senate: 1 senator (of 348)
  - National Assembly: 1 seat shared with Saint Martin (of 577)

Area
  - Total: 25 (Note: 25 square kilometres (9.7 sq mi) including the outlying uninhabited islets, and 21 square kilometres (8.1 sq mi) without the outlying islets.) km^{2} (9.7 sq mi)
  - Water (%): negligible
- Highest elevation: 286 m (938 ft)

Population
  - Jan. 2023 census: 10,660 (not ranked)
  - Density: 426/km^{2} (1,103.3/sq mi) (not ranked)
- GDP (nominal): 2023 estimate
  - Total: US$1.04 billion (€960.5 million)
  - Per capita: US$97,454 (€90,103)
- Currency: Euro (€) (EUR)
- Time zone: UTC-4:00 (AST)
- Driving side: Right
- Calling code: +590
- INSEE code: 977
- ISO 3166 code: BL; FR-BL
- Internet TLD: .bl; .fr

Saint Barthélemy, (Note: French: Saint-Barthélemy, [sɛ̃ baʁtelemi]) officially the Territorial Collectivity of Saint Barthélemy, (Note: French: Collectivité territoriale de Saint-Barthélemy) also known as St. Barts and St. Barths (English) or St. Barth (French), is an overseas collectivity of France in the Caribbean. The island lies about 30 kilometres (19 mi) southeast of the island of Saint Martin. It is northeast of the Dutch islands of Saba and Sint Eustatius, and north of the independent country of Saint Kitts and Nevis.

Saint Barthélemy was for many years a French commune forming part of Guadeloupe, which is an overseas region and department of France. In 2003 the island voted in favour of secession from Guadeloupe to form a separate overseas collectivity (collectivité d'outre-mer, abbreviated to COM) of France. The collectivity is one of four territories among the Leeward Islands in the northeastern Caribbean that make up the French West Indies, along with Saint Martin, Guadeloupe (200 kilometres (120 mi) southeast) and Martinique. Saint Barthélemy is represented in both the French Senate and National Assembly, the latter through a shared seat with Saint Martin.

A volcanic island fully encircled by shallow reefs, Saint Barthélemy has an area of 25 square kilometres (9.7 sq mi) and a population of 10,660 at the January 2023 census. Its capital is Gustavia, which also contains the main harbour. It is the only Caribbean island that was a Swedish colony for any significant length of time. It remained so for nearly a century before it returned to French rule after an 1877 referendum.

Symbolism from the Swedish national arms, the Three Crowns, appears in the island's coat of arms, due to the island's time as a Swedish colony. The language, cuisine and culture are French Caribbean, including a mix of French culture from mainland France as well as other influences including creole or patois languages, celebration of Carnival, and Caribbean music. The island is a popular tourist destination during the winter holiday season, geared towards the high-end, luxury tourist market.

== Etymology ==
The island was named by Christopher Columbus in honour of Bartholomew the Apostle in 1493; it was also a way of honouring his younger brother Bartholomew Columbus.

== History ==
=== Early period ===
Before European contact the island was possibly frequented by Eastern Caribbean Taíno and Arawak people, who called the island 'Ouanalao', though it is believed that the island was not inhabited permanently due to its lack of fresh water sources and poor soil. (Note: There currently is not enough archeological evidence to give a more detailed description about the pre-Columbian presence.) Christopher Columbus was the first European to encounter the island in 1493. Sporadic visits continued for the next hundred years until formal colonisation began taking shape.

=== 17th century ===
By 1648 the island was settled by the French, encouraged by Phillippe de Longvilliers de Poincy, the lieutenant-governor of the French West India Company, and initially comprised about 50 to 60 settlers, later augmented by smaller numbers coming from St Kitts. Led by Jacques Gentes, the new arrivals began cultivating cacao. In 1656, the settlement was attacked by Caribs and briefly abandoned.

De Poincy was the dominant administrator in this period and a member of the Order of Saint John. He facilitated the transfer of ownership from the Compagnie des Îles de l'Amérique to the Order. He continued to rule the island until he died in 1660. Five years later, it was bought by the French West India Company along with the Order's other possessions in the Caribbean. By 1674, the company was dissolved and the islands became part of the French Kingdom and added to the colony of Guadeloupe.

=== 18th century ===
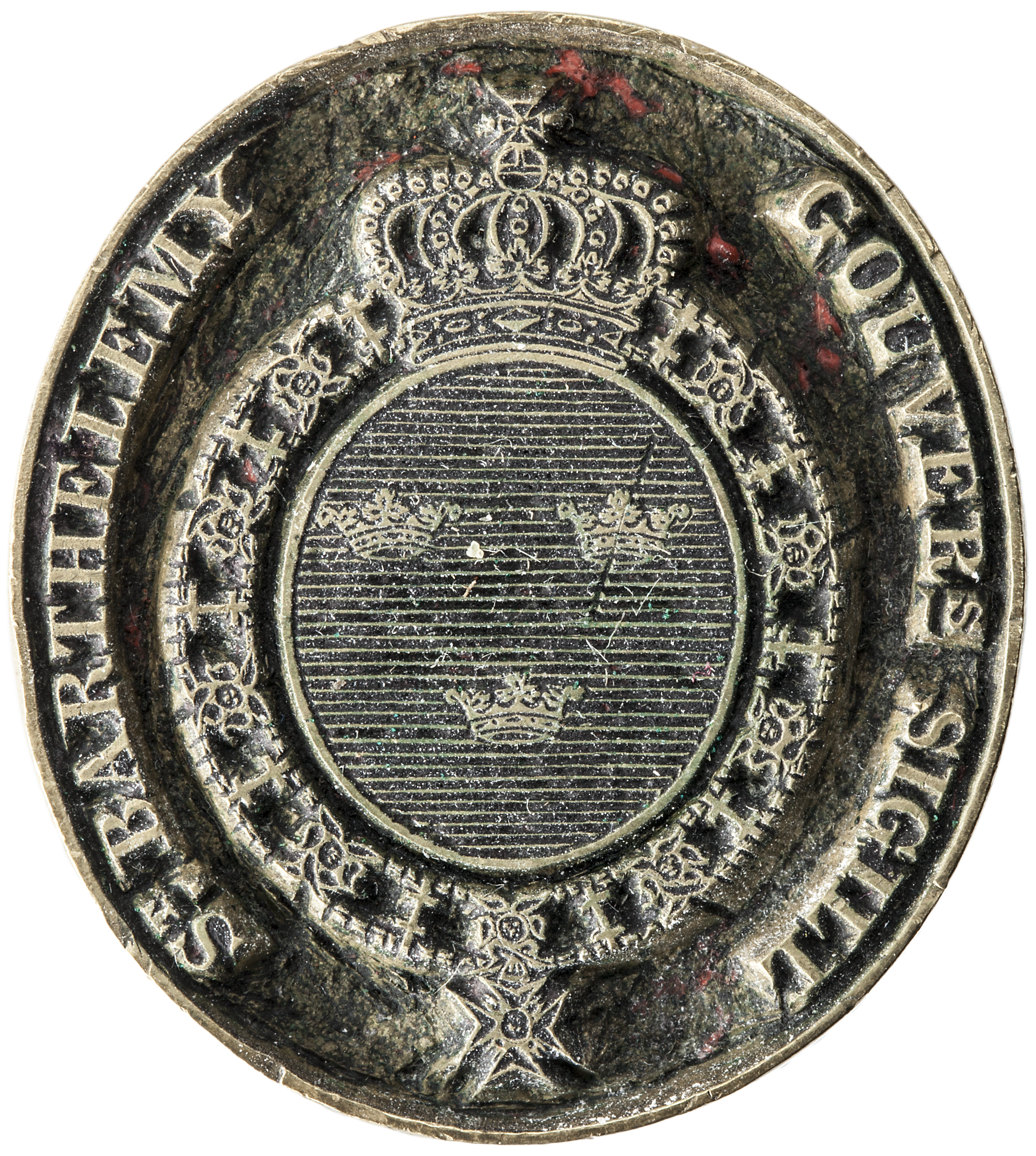
The seal of the governor of the Swedish colony, 1784–1877

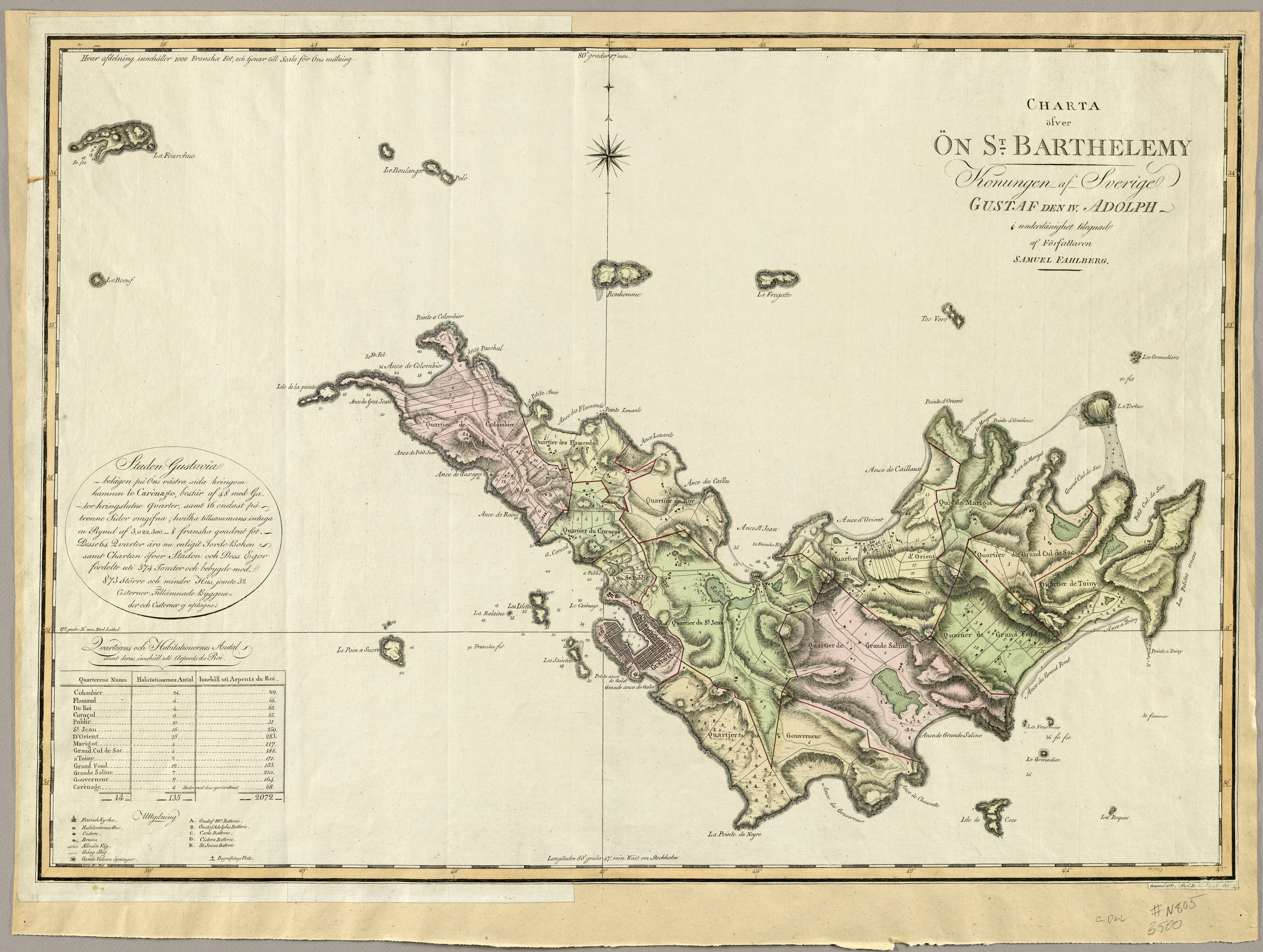
Historical quartiers (1801)

The island proved economically unsuccessful, and was subject to the activities of pirates, most notably Daniel Montbars aka 'Montbars the Exterminator'. In 1744, British forces captured the island. In 1764, it reverted to French control. Deeming it to be of little worth, King Louis XVI traded the island to Sweden in 1784 in return for trading privileges in Gothenburg. This change of control saw progress and prosperity as the Swedes declared Gustavia, named after the Swedish king Gustav III who ruled at that time, a free port, convenient for trading by the Europeans for goods, including contraband material.

=== 19th century ===
In March 1801, British forces occupied the island as part of the French Revolutionary Wars. The Swedish put up no resistance due to being heavily outnumbered and agreed to surrender after assembling a council of war.

Slavery was practised in St. Barthélemy under the Ordinance concerning the Police of Slaves and free Coloured People of 1787. The last legally owned slaves in the Swedish colony of St. Barthélemy were granted their freedom by the state in October 1847. Since the island was not a plantation area, the freed slaves suffered economic hardships due to lack of opportunities for employment and many left to more prosperous islands, and few people of African descent remain on the island.

In 1850, a devastating hurricane hit the island, followed by a fire in 1852. The economy suffered, and Sweden sought to divest themselves of the island. Following a referendum in 1877, Sweden sold the island back to France in 1878, after which it was administered as part of Guadeloupe. Swedish media supported the sale of the island to France, characterizing the island's poverty as a source of national humiliation for Sweden.

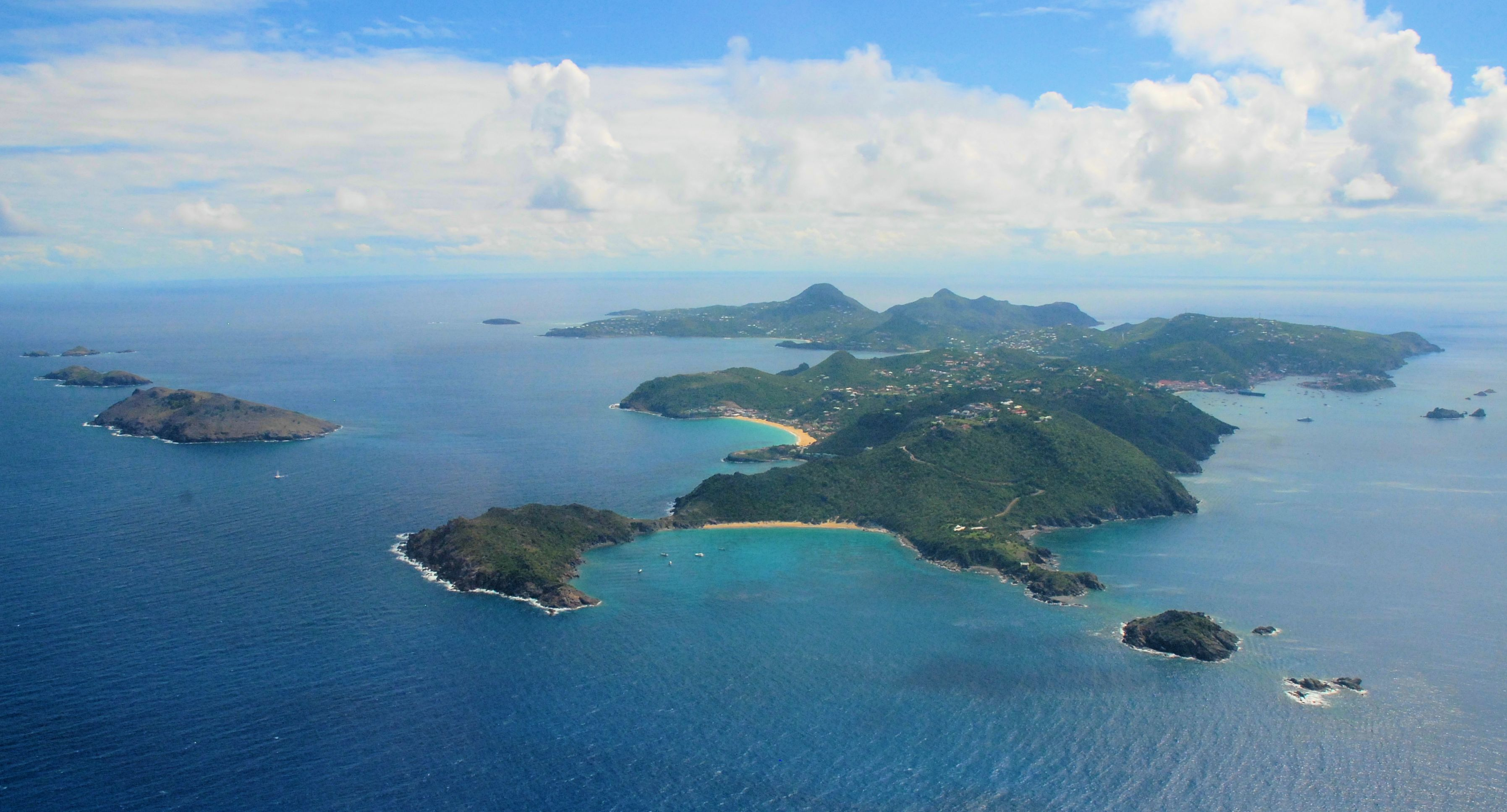
View of St. Barthélemy

=== 20th century ===
On 19 March 1946, the people of the island became French citizens with full rights. With few economic prospects on the islands, many men from St. Barthélemy took jobs on Saint Thomas to support their families. Organised tourism and hotels began in earnest in the 1960s and developed in the 1970s onwards, particularly after the building of the island's landing strip that can accommodate mid-sized aircraft.

The island soon became renowned as a high-class luxury destination, frequented by celebrities such as Greta Garbo, Howard Hughes, Benjamin de Rothschild, David Rockefeller, Lorne Michaels, Chevy Chase, Steve Martin, Jimmy Buffett and Johnny Hallyday. The boost in tourism led to a rise in living standards and rapid modernisation.

The island was not electrified until the 1980s.

=== 21st century ===
Saint Barthélemy was for many years a French commune, forming part of Guadeloupe, an overseas region and department of France. Through a referendum in 2003, island residents sought separation from the administrative jurisdiction of Guadeloupe. The island became a separate collectivity in February 2007. The island of Saint Barthélemy became an Overseas Collectivity (COM).

A governing territorial council was elected for its administration, which has provided the island with a certain degree of autonomy. A senator represents the island in Paris. St. Barthélemy has retained its free port status. In January 2012, Saint Barthélemy ceased being an outermost region and left the EU to become an OCT (Overseas Country or Territory).

The island sustained damage from Hurricane Irma in September 2017 but recovered quickly, and by early 2018 transport and electricity were largely operational.

== Geography ==
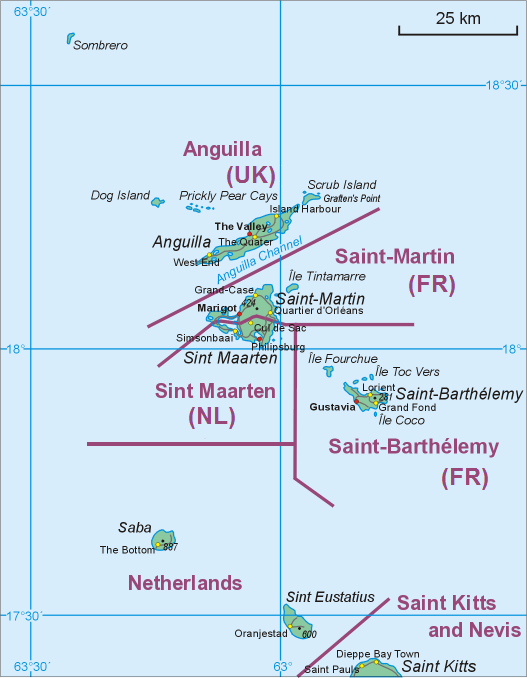
A map showing the location of St. Barts relative to Sint Maarten/Saint Martin and St Kitts

A map of Saint-Barthélemy

About 250 kilometres (160 mi) east of Puerto Rico and the nearer Virgin Islands, St. Barthélemy is immediately southeast of the islands of Saint Martin and Anguilla. It is separated from Saint Martin by the Saint-Barthélemy Channel. It lies northeast of Saba and St Eustatius and north of St Kitts.

Several smaller uninhabited islands lie offshore, the largest of which are Île Fourchue, Île Coco, Île Chevreau (Île Bonhomme), Île Frégate, Île Toc Vers, Île Tortue, Roche Plate (Table à Diable) and Mancel ou la Poule et les Poussins.

There are numerous smaller islets, such as La Petite Islette, L'Îlet au Vent, Île Pelé, Île le Boulanger, Roche le Bœuf, Île Petit Jean, L'Âne Rouge, Les Gros Islets, La Baleine des Gros Islets, Pain de Sucre, Les Baleines du Pain de Sucre, Fourmis, Les Petit Saints, Roches Roubes, Les Baleines de Grand Fond and Les Grenadins.

=== Marine areas ===
St. Barthélemy forms, with St. Martin, Anguilla, and Dog Island, a distinct group that lies upon the western edge of a flat bank of soundings composed chiefly of shells, sand, and coral. From St. Barthélemy, the bank extends east-southeast, ending in a small tongue or spit. It is separated from the main bank by a narrow length of deep water. East of the island, the edge of the bank lies 22 kilometres (14 miles) away.

Grande Saline Bay provides temporary anchorage for small vessels while Colombier Bay, to the northwest, has a 4 fathoms patch near mid-entrance. In the bight of St. Jean Bay, there is a narrow cut through the reef. The north and east sides of the island are fringed, to a short distance from the shore, by a visible coral reef. Reefs are mostly in shallow waters and are clearly visible. The coastal areas abound with beaches and many of these have offshore reefs, some of which are part of a marine reserve.

The marine reserve, founded in 1999, covers more than 1,000 hectares (2,500 acres) of protected and vulnerable habitats, bays, and islands, and includes a zone that is restricted to scientific observations only. As the sea surrounding the St. Barthélemy is rich in coral reefs and other precious marine life, the area has been declared a protected area since 1996. Environmental awareness is quite pronounced in St. Barthélemy and is promoted by the Environmental Commission.

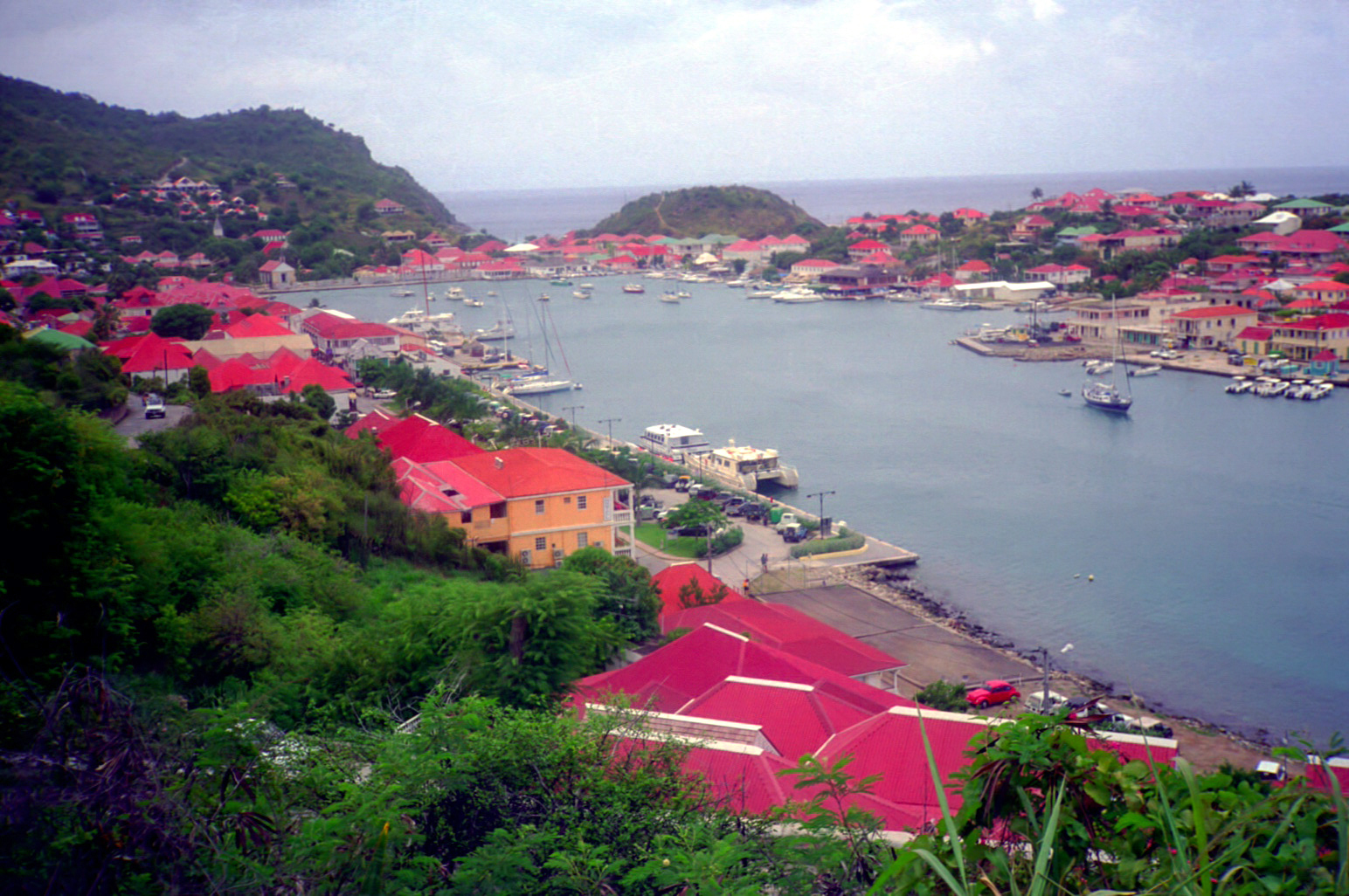
View of Gustavia

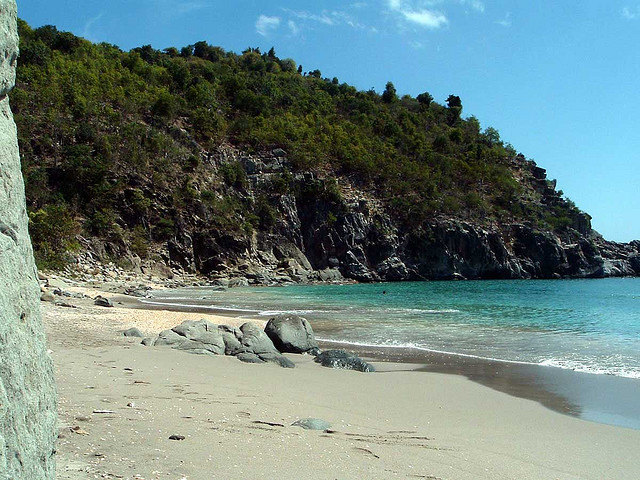
Shell Beach (Anse De Grand Galet)

There are as many as 22 public beaches (most beaches on St. Barthélémy are known as "Anse de..."), of which 15 are considered fit for swimming. They are categorized and divided into two groups, the leeward side (calm waters protected by the island itself) and the windward side (some of which are protected by hills and reefs). Windward beaches are popular for windsurfing. The beach of St Jean is suitable for water sports and facilities have been created for that purpose. The long beach at Lorient has shade and is quieter than St. Jean.

Grand-cul-de-sac is a long beach with facilities for water sports. Anse de Flamands is a very wide sandy beach and Le petit Anse ("The little beach"), just north of Anse de Flamands, is very safe and popular with locals for children. Anse Toiny beach is in a remote location and is considered suitable only for experienced surfers as the current is very strong.

On the leeward side, notable beaches are Anse du Gouverneur, Anse du Colombier (accessible only by foot or boat), Anse de Grand Galet (Shell Beach), and Anse de Grande Saline, which is popular with nudists. The area around the salt ponds near the Anse de Grande Saline beach is marshy and a habitat for tropical birds. Ile islet, an offshoot of the leeward side, has a white sandy beach.

Shell Beach, also called Anse de Grand Galet (in French, 'Anse' means "cove" and Galet means "pebble"), is a beach in southwestern Gustavia. Many seashells are scattered on it. This beach was hit by the strong waves of Hurricane Lenny in 1999, causing erosion. It was supplemented with new sand in 2000.

On the north coast, on the far eastern side of the island, are two lagoons, the Anse de Marigot and Anse du Grand Cul-de-Sac.

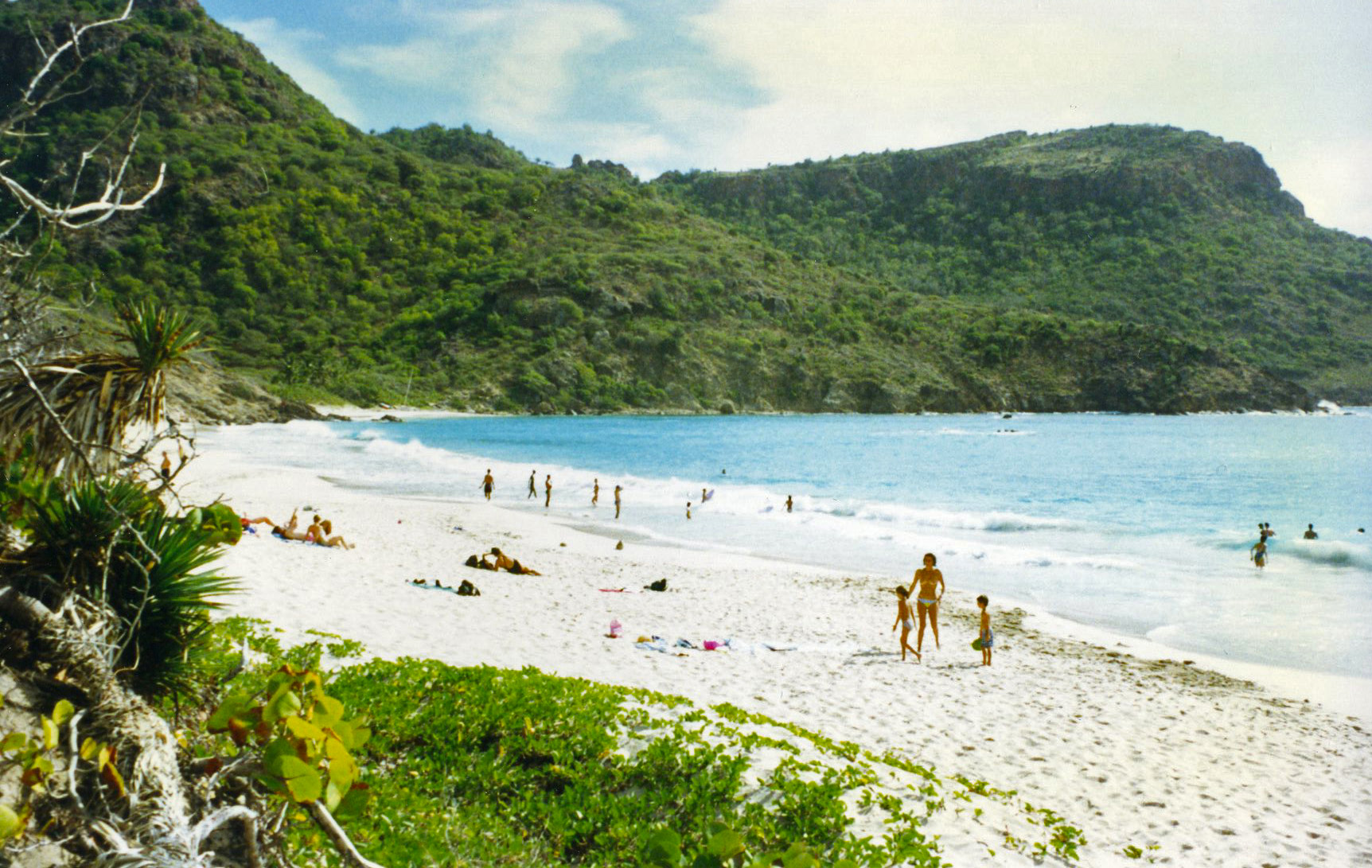
Beach at the Anse de Grande Saline

=== Interior areas ===
Morne de Vitet, 286 metres (938 feet) tall, is the island's highest peak. Hills and valleys of varying topography cover the rest of the island. Notable are Morne Rouge, Morne Criquet, Morne de Grand Fond, Morne de Dépoudré and Morne Lurin. The largest bodies of water on the island are Étang de Saint-Jean, Grande Saline, Grand Étang, and Petit Étang.

=== Populated areas ===
The population is spread among 40 quartiers, roughly corresponding to settlements. They are grouped into two paroisses (parishes):

The territorial subdivisions are two paroisses (parishes) with 40 quartiers

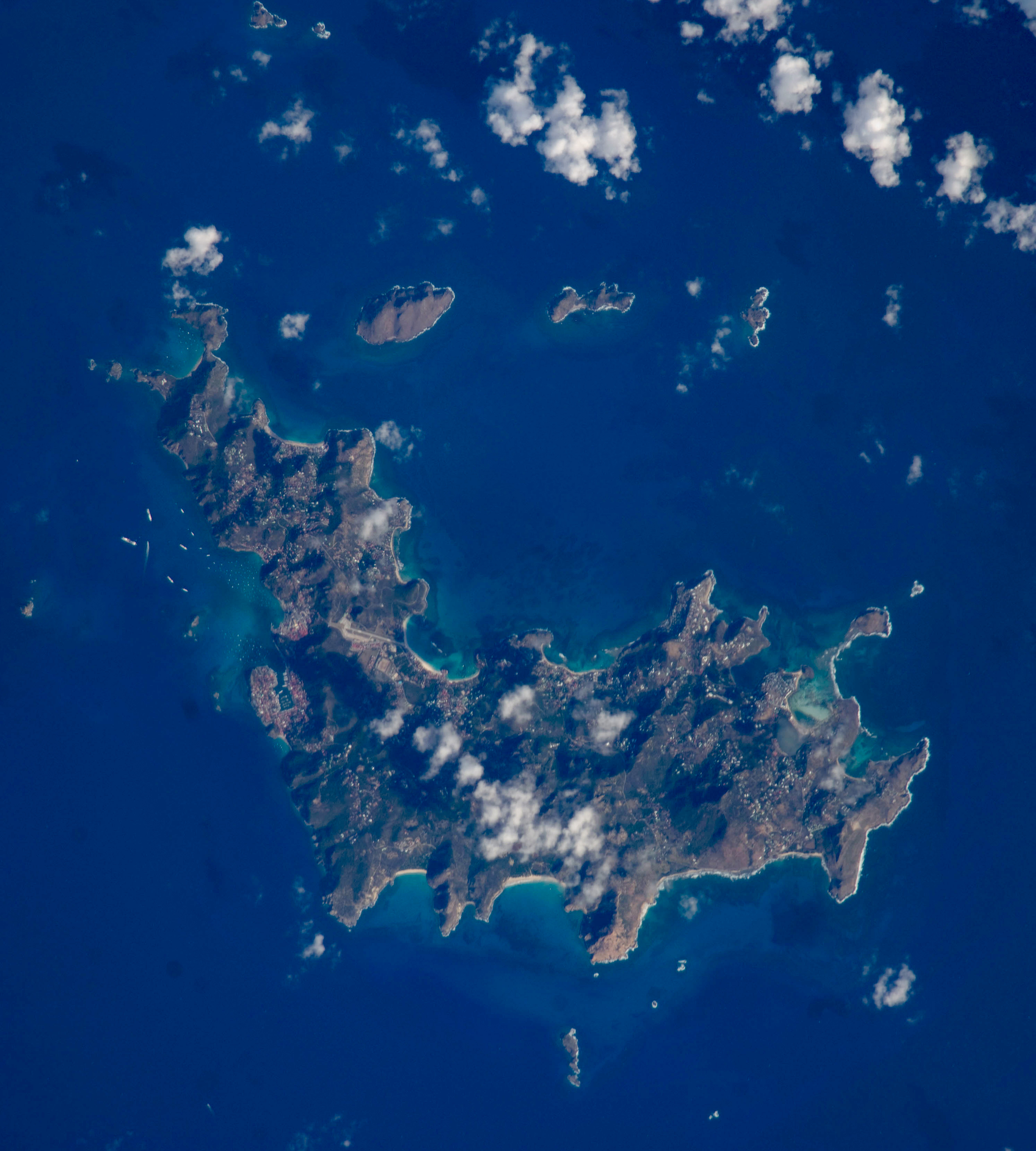
A satellite picture of the island

Sous le Vent (Leeward)		Au Vent (Windward)	
Nr	Quartier	Nr	Quartier
1; 2; 3; 4; 5; 6; 7; 8; 9; 10; 11; 12; 13; 14; 15; 16; 17; 18; 19; 20	Colombier; Flamands; Terre Neuve; Grande Vigie; Corossol; Merlette; La Grande Montagne; Anse des Lézards; Anse des Cayes; Le Palidor; Public; Col de la Tourmente; Quartier du Roi; Le Château; Aéroport; Saint-Jean; Gustavia; La Pointe; Lurin; Carénage	21; 22; 23; 24; 25; 26; 27; 28; 29; 30; 31; 32; 33; 34; 35; 36; 37; 38; 39; 40	Morne Criquet; Morne de Dépoudré; Gouverneur; Anse du Gouverneur; Morne Rouge; Grande Saline; Petite Saline; Lorient; Barrière des Quatres Vents; Camaruche; Grand Fond; Toiny; Devet; Vitet; Grand Cul-de-Sac; Pointe Milou; Mont Jean; Marigot; Anse du Grand Cul-de-Sac; Petit Cul-de-Sac

=== Climate ===
The island has an area of 25 square kilometres (10 mi^{2}). The eastern side is wetter than the western. The climate is essentially arid. Rainfall averages 1,000 millimetres (40 inches) annually, but with considerable variation over the terrain.

Summer is from May to November, which is also the rainy season. Winter, from December to April, is the dry season. Sunshine is very prominent for nearly the entire year and even during the rainy season. Humidity is not very high, due to the winds. The average temperature is around 25 °C (77 °F) with day temperatures rising to 32 °C (90 °F).

The average high and low temperatures in January are 28 °C (82 °F) and 22 °C (72 °F), respectively. In July, they are 30 °C (86 °F) and 24 °C (75 °F). The lowest night temperature recorded is 13 °C (55 °F). The Caribbean sea waters in the vicinity generally maintain a temperature of about 27 °C (81 °F).

== Demographics ==
In 2023, Saint-Barthélemy had a population of 10,660. Residents, known as Saint-Barthélemois or St. Barths, are French citizens. Most of them are descendants of the first settlers, of Breton, Norman, Poitevin, Saintongeais and Angevin lineage. There is also a big community of Portuguese emigrants mainly from the North of Portugal, around 3,000 people.

French is the official language with four vernaculars spoken on the island: St. Barth Patois, St. Barth Creole, Saline French and Gustavia English. Unlike other populations in the Caribbean, language preference between the Créole and Patois is geographically, not racially, determined. St. Barthélemy French or Patois is spoken on the leeward (western) portion of the island and is superficially related to other varieties of French spoken in North America. St. Barth Creole is spoken on the windward (eastern) side and is a variety of Antillean Creole, perfectly intelligible with Martinican Creole and Guadeloupean Creole. There was also a unique French variety spoken within the quartier of Saline, that was described as difficult for both Creole and Patois-speaking islanders to understand.

English is understood in most hotels and restaurants. There is a moribund English vernacular that has been spoken in Gustavia since the 1780's. Despite a near-century of Swedish colonial rule, Swedish was never commonly spoken in Saint Barthélemy, having been described as almost extinct on the island by 1862. English was commonly spoken in Gustavia until the end of Swedish rule in 1878, while French and Creole French remained the primary language throughout the rest of the island.

=== Historical population ===
Historical population

Year	Pop.	±% p.a.
1671	336	—
1686	448	+1.94%
1700	90	−10.83%
1732	365	+4.47%
1766	523	+1.06%
1775	754	+4.15%
1785	749	−0.07%
1790	1,556	+15.75%
1794	2,212	+9.19%
1815	5,763	+4.67%
1821	5,003	−2.33%
1826	4,016	−4.30%
1836	3,223	−2.18%

Year	Pop.	±% p.a.
1846	2,590	−2.16%
1857	2,901	+1.04%
1866	2,898	−0.01%
1875	2,374	−2.32%
1884	2,555	+0.82%
1889	2,654	+0.76%
1901	2,772	+0.36%
1906	2,616	−1.15%
1911	2,545	−0.55%
1921	2,519	−0.10%
1926	2,538	+0.15%
1931	2,354	−1.49%
1936	2,479	+1.04%

Year	Pop.	±% p.a.
1946	2,231	−0.95%
1954	2,079	−0.94%
1961	2,176	+0.63%
1967	2,351	+1.29%
1974	2,491	+0.83%
1982	3,059	+2.82%
1990	5,038	+6.42%
1999	6,852	+3.48%
2007	8,450	+2.72%
2012	9,131	+1.56%
2017	9,961	+1.76%
2023	10,660	+1.14%

Official figures from French and Swedish censuses. Census date for censuses after 1999 is 1 January.

=== Structure of the population ===
Population by Sex and Age Group (Census 01.I.2015):

Age group	Male	Female	Total	%
Total	5 117	4 508	9 625	100
0–4	261	239	500	5.19
5–9	270	230	500	5.19
10–14	241	221	462	4.80
15–19	177	169	346	3.59
20–24	309	316	624	6.48
25–29	505	424	929	9.65
30–34	467	399	866	9.00
35–39	430	400	830	8.62
40–44	425	378	803	8.34
45–49	563	386	949	9.86
50–54	459	356	814	8.46
55–59	384	300	684	7.11
60–64	219	201	420	4.36
65–69	152	147	299	3.11
70–74	116	125	242	2.51
75–79	67	93	160	1.66
80–84	43	75	118	1.23
85–89	18	30	48	0.50
90–94	11	15	26	0.27
95–99	0	5	5	0.05
100+	0	0	0	0
Age group	Male	Female	Total	Percent
0–14	772	690	1 462	15.19
15–64	3 938	3 328	7 266	75.49
65+	407	490	897	9.32

Population Estimates by Sex and Age Group (01.VII.2021) (Provisional):

Age group	Male	Female	Total	%
Total	5 007	5 689	10 696	100
0–4	351	345	696	6.51
5–9	373	377	750	7.01
10–14	403	399	802	7.50
15–19	404	392	796	7.44
20–24	315	316	631	5.90
25–29	253	301	554	5.18
30–34	269	336	605	5.66
35–39	271	355	626	5.85
40–44	275	349	623	5.82
45–49	313	384	696	6.51
50–54	351	414	765	7.15
55–59	371	415	785	7.34
60–64	320	351	670	6.26
65–69	264	298	561	5.24
70–74	193	231	423	3.95
75–79	131	166	297	2.78
80–84	85	124	208	1.94
85–89	48	81	128	1.20
90–94	19	42	61	0.57
95–99	6	15	21	0.20
100+	0	4	4	0.04
Age group	Male	Female	Total	Percent
0–14	1 127	1 121	2 248	21.02
15–64	3 134	3 607	6 741	63.02
65+	746	961	1 707	15.96

=== Religion ===
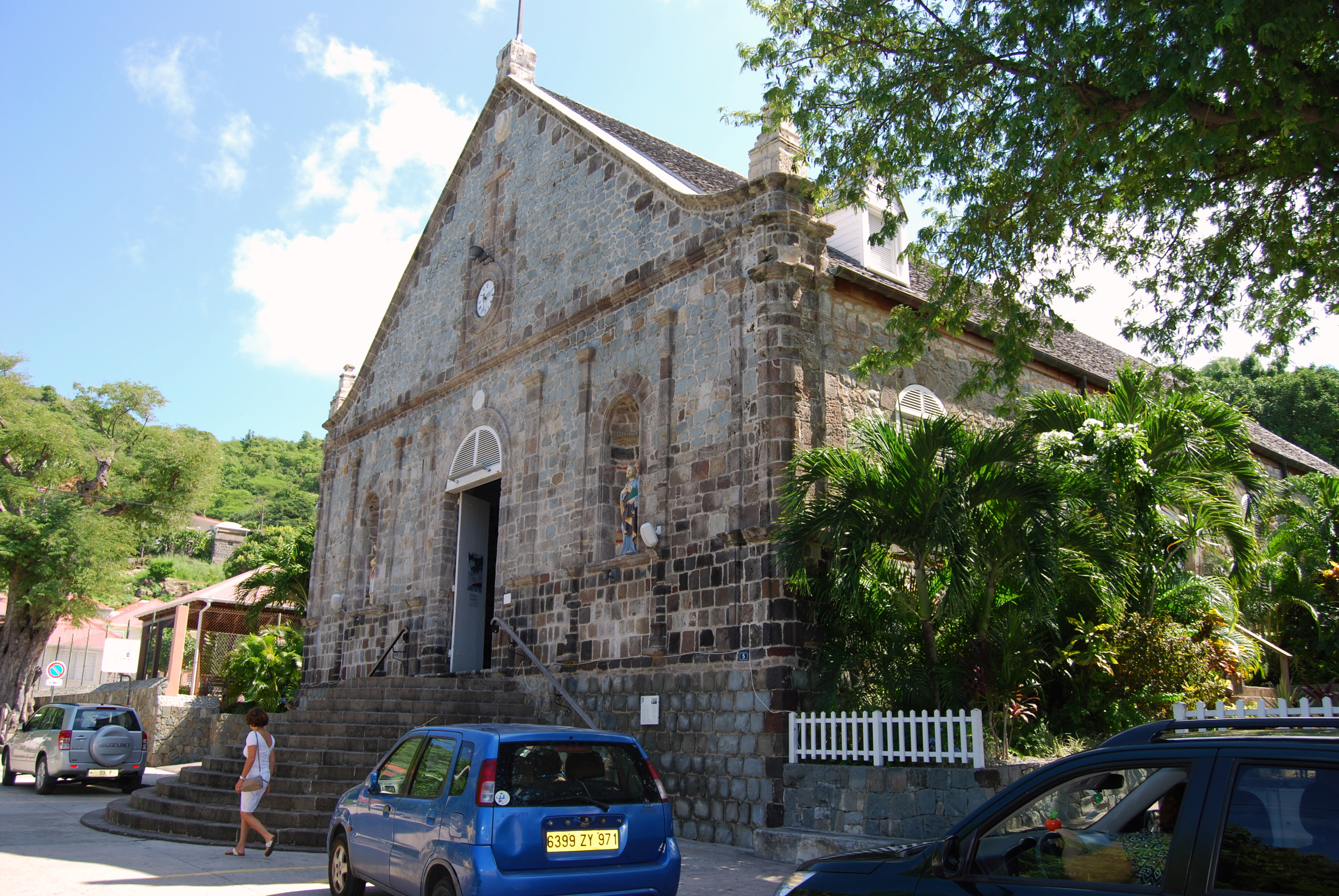
Church of Our Lady of the Assumption, Gustavia (Église Notre-Dame-de-l'Assomption de Gustavia)

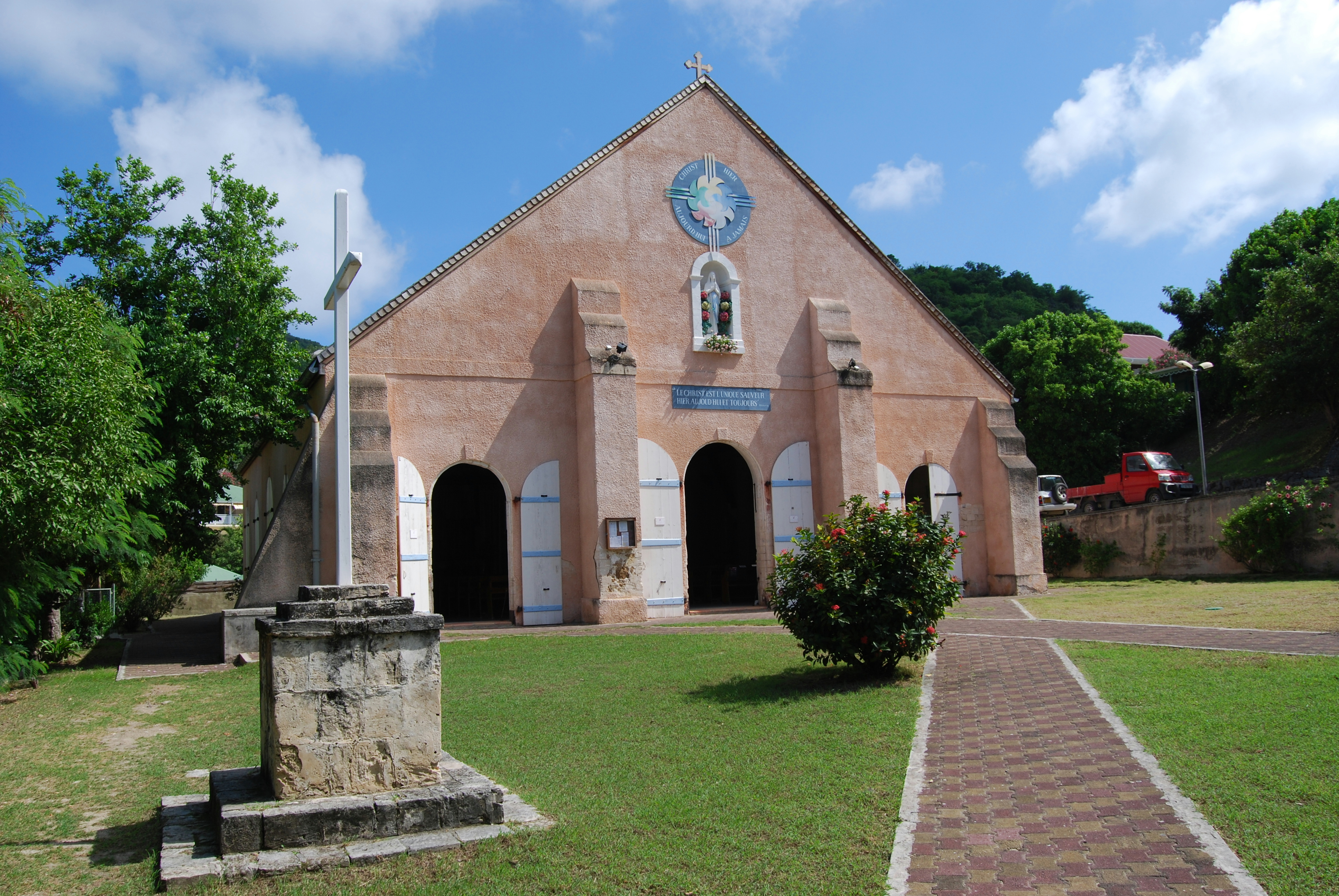
Church of Our Lady of the Assumption, Lorient (Église Notre-Dame-de-l'Assomption de Lorient)

The majority of the population of Saint Barthélemy are Christian. Saint Barthélemy is considered the most religiously homogeneous territory in the French West Indies, with particular importance given to the Catholic Church.

The territory of Saint-Barthélemy forms the parish of Our Lady of the Assumption (Notre-Dame-de-l'Assomption), which depends on the diocese of Basse-Terre and Pointe-à-Pitre ( diocèse de Basse-Terre et Pointe-à-Pitre), whose see is located in the cathedral of Our Lady of Guadeloupe (Notre-Dame-de-Guadeloupe).

The presbytery is in the district of Lorient, and dates from 1822. The building, including the masonry terrace, the staircases, the outbuildings and the gardens, has been protected as a historic monument of France since 2002.

There are two main Catholic churches, both dedicated to Our Lady of the Assumption or Notre-Dame-de-l'Assomption (the one in Lorient and the one in Gustavia) and a chapel of St. Catherine of Siena (Chapelle de Sainte Catherine de Sienne) in Colombier.

Saint Barthélemy is also part of the Diocese of the North Eastern Caribbean and Aruba (diocèse de la Caraïbe du Nord-Est et d'Aruba), which is under the Church of England (Church in the Province of the West Indies). It serves a small minority on the island. It is centered in the Anglican Church of Saint Bartholomew (Église anglicane de Saint-Barthélemy), built between 1853 and 1855. The small Pentecostal Christian community has no church building of its own and offers religious services at St Barth's Beach Hotel.

The main religious holidays are Christmas, the day of the Assumption of the Virgin Mary (15 August), All Saints' Day (1 November) and the feast of St. Bartholomew (patron saint of the island) on 24 August.

== Politics and government ==
Until 2007 the whole island of St. Barthélemy was a French commune (commune de Saint-Barthélemy), forming part of Guadeloupe which is an overseas région and overseas département of France. In 2003, the population voted through a referendum in favour of secession from Guadeloupe to form a separate overseas collectivity (collectivité d'outre-mer, or COM) of France.

On 7 February 2007, the French Parliament passed a bill granting COM status to both St. Barthélemy and (separately) to the neighbouring Saint Martin. The new status took effect on 15 July 2007, when the first territorial council was elected, according to the law. The island has a president (elected every five years), a unicameral Territorial Council of nineteen members who are elected by popular vote and serve for five-year terms, and an executive council of seven members. Elections to these councils were first held on 1 July 2007 with the most recent election in 2022.

One senator represents the island in the Senate, while a deputy jointly elected with Saint Martin represents it in the National Assembly. St. Barthélemy became an overseas territory of the European Union on 1 January 2012, but the island's inhabitants remain French citizens with EU status holding EU passports. France is responsible for the defence of the island and as such has stationed a security force on the island comprising six policemen and thirteen gendarmes (posted on a two-year term).

The French State is represented by a prefect appointed by the president on the advice of the minister of the interior. As a collectivity of France, the island's national anthem is La Marseillaise, though L'Hymne a St. Barthélemy is also used unofficially.

== Economy ==
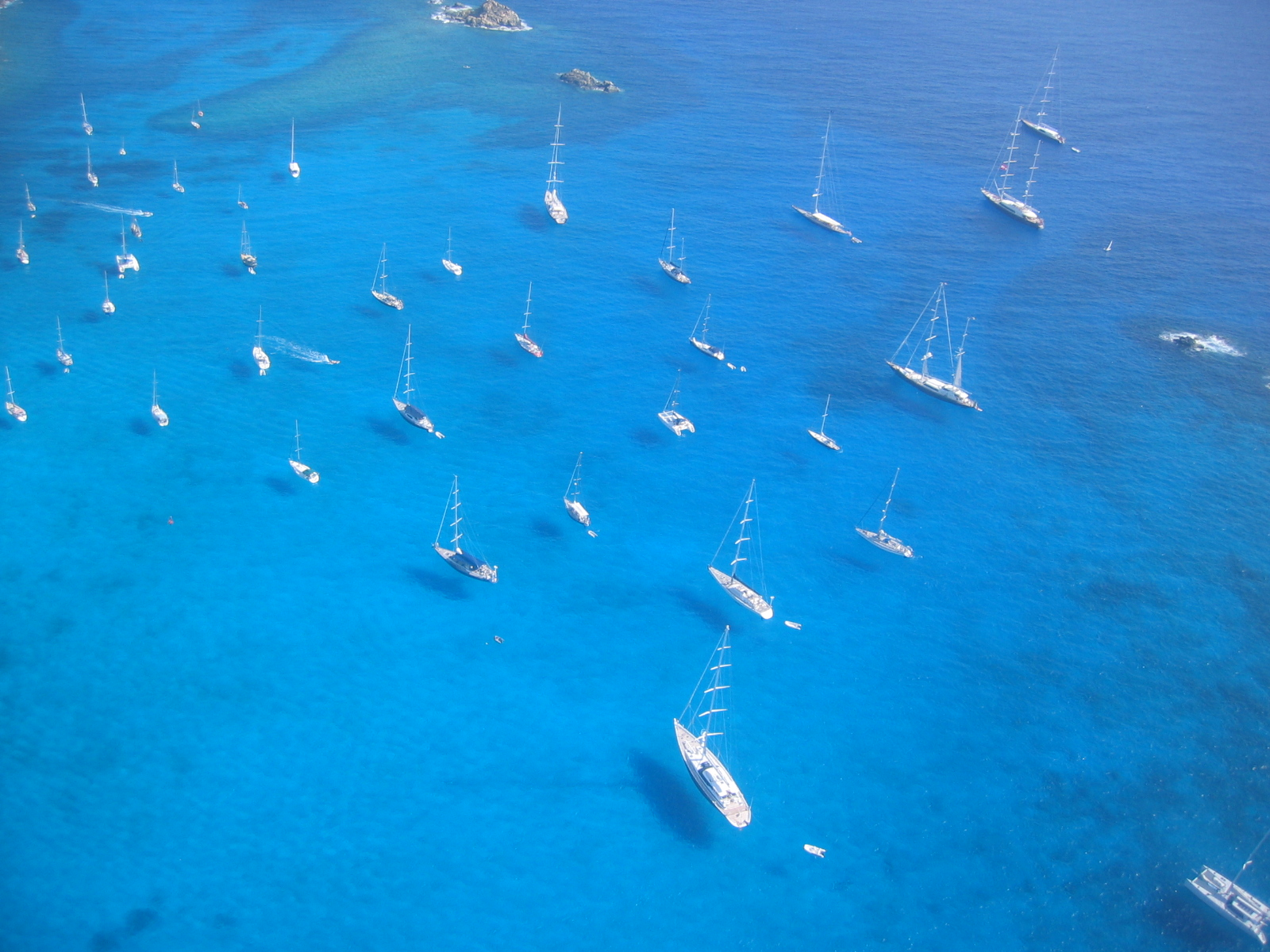
Sailboats and yachts in St. Barts

The economy of the island is based on tourism and duty-free retail. The official currency of St. Barthélemy is the euro.

The nominal GDP of Saint Barthélemy was 960.5 million euros in 2023 (US$1.04 billion). That year the nominal GDP per capita of Saint Barthelemy was 90,103 euros (US$97,454), one of the highest GDPs per capita in the Caribbean, more than five times that of the nearby Collectivity of Saint Martin, more than three times the GDP per capita of Guadeloupe, and more than double the GDP per capita of metropolitan France.

=== Tourism ===
International investment and the wealth generated by tourism explain the island's high standard of living. Most of the food is imported from the United States or France. About 200,000 tourists visit every year. As a result, there is a boom in housebuilding activity catering to tourists and permanent residents.

Saint Barthélemy is renowned for its high-end villas and luxury real estate market, attracting both short-term visitors and permanent residents. Real estate agencies specialize in exclusive villa rentals and property sales, further enhancing the island's reputation as a luxury destination.

St. Barthélemy has about 25 hotels, most with 15 rooms or fewer; the largest has 58 rooms. Hotels are classified in the traditional French manner; 3 Star, 4 Star and 4 Star Luxe. Of particular note are Eden Rock and Cheval Blanc. Hotel Le Toiny, the most expensive hotel on the island, has 12 rooms.

Most places of accommodation are in the form of private villas, of which there are some 400 available to rent on the island. The island's tourism industry, though expensive, attracts 70,000 visitors every year to its hotels and villas; another 130,000 people arrive by boat. It also attracts a labour force from Portugal. A team of analysts have analysed Airbnb's Luxe offerings in 27 of their most popular luxury locations around the world and concluded that St Barths is the top location for luxury Airbnb accommodation worldwide.

Corossol is noted for its handicrafts; weaving hats and bags from palm fronds is a low-income economic activity of the Indigenous people.

== Wildlife ==
=== Flora ===
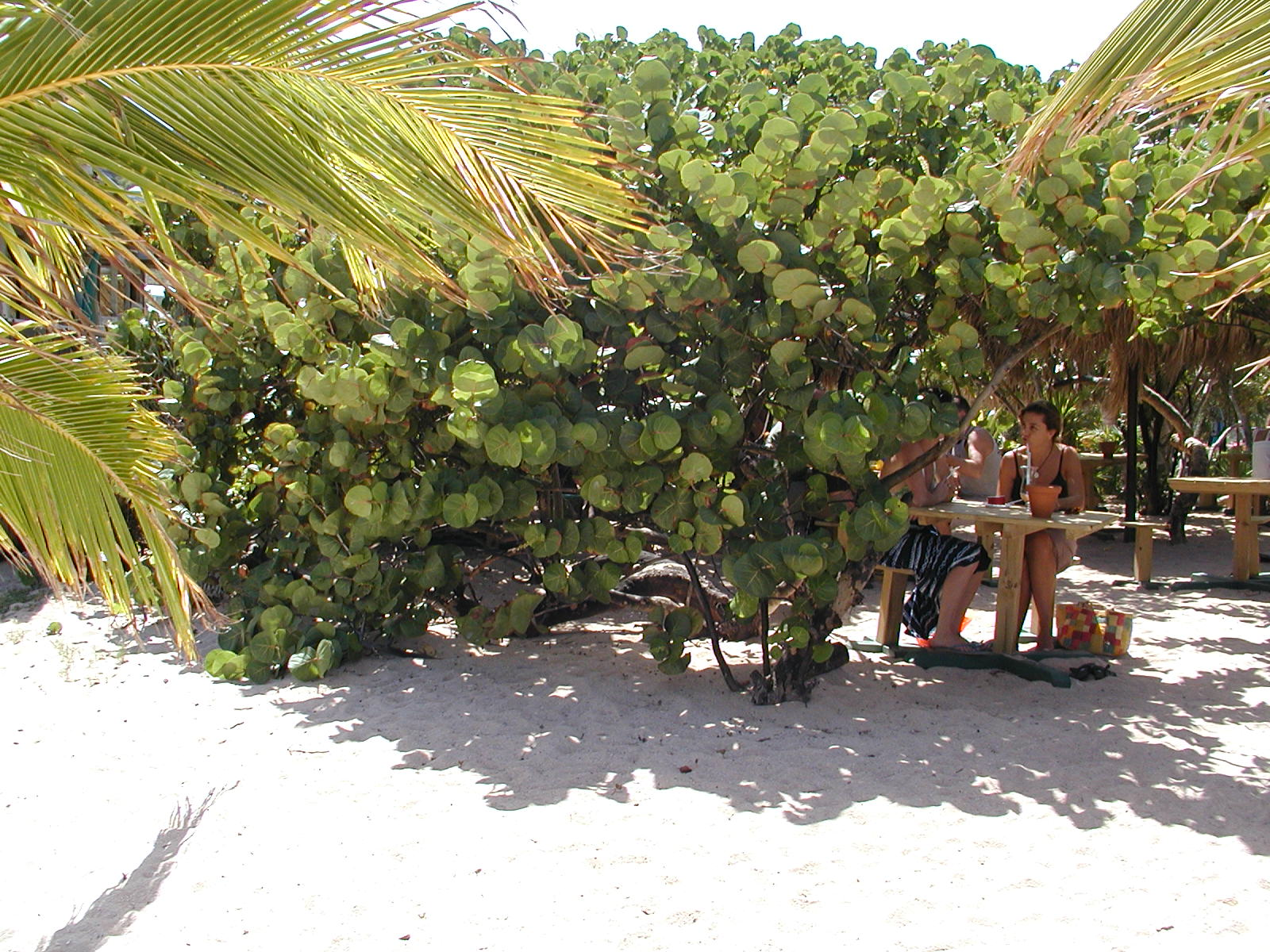
Vegetation at Baie de Saint-Jean

As the terrain is generally arid, the hills have mostly poor soil and support only cacti and succulent plants. During the rainy season, the area turns green with vegetation and grass. The eastern part of the island is greener, with more rainfall. A 1994 survey revealed several hundred indigenous species of plants, including the naturalized varieties of flora. Some grow in irrigated areas, while the dry areas are dominated by cacti.

Sea grapes and palm trees are a common sight with mangroves and shrubs surviving in the saline coastal swamps. Coconut palm was brought to the island from the Pacific islands. Important plants noted on the island include flamboyant trees, frangipanis, sabal palms, wild trumpet and Manchineel trees.

Other trees of note include the royal palm, sea grape trees in the form of shrubs on the beaches, and as 5 to 7 metres (16 to 23 feet) trees in the interior areas of the island, aloe or aloe vera (brought from the Mediterranean), the night blooming cereus, mamillaria nivosa, yellow prickly pear or barbary fig which was planted as barbed wire defences against invading British army in 1773, Mexican cactus, stapelia gigantea, golden trumpet or yellow bell which was originally from South America, bougainvillea and others.

=== Fauna ===
Marine mammals include dolphins, porpoises and whales, are seen here during the migration period from December until May. Turtles are a common sight along the coastline of the island. They are a protected species and on the endangered list. Though they live in the sea, the females come to the shore to lay eggs and are protected by private societies. Three species of turtles are particularly notable. These are: The leatherback sea turtles are the largest of the type found here, sometimes measuring as much as 3 metres (10 feet) (average is about 1.5 m or 5 ft) and weighing about 450; the hawksbill turtles, are found near reefs, generally about 90 centimetres (35 inches) in diameter and weigh about 60 and their diet consists of crabs and snails; and the green turtles, herbivores, generally about 90 centimetres (35 inches) in diameter and live amidst tall sea grasses.

==== Avifauna ====
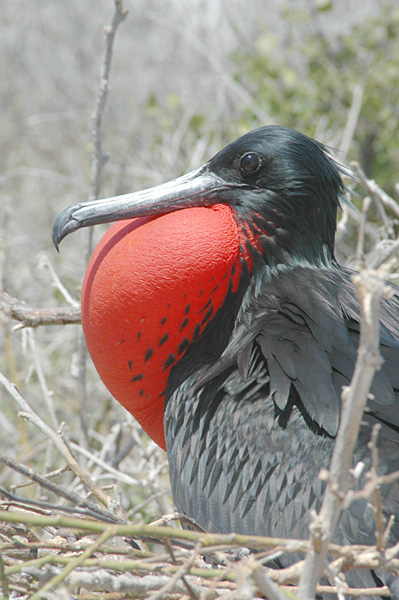
Frigatebird

The wild avifauna, both native and migratory, include brown pelicans along the shoreline, magnificent frigatebirds with wingspans of up to 1.8 metres (5.9 ft), green herons, snowy egrets, belted kingfishers, bananaquits, broad-winged hawks, two species of hummingbirds (the green-throated carib and Antillean crested hummingbird), and the zenaida dove.

==== Aquafauna ====
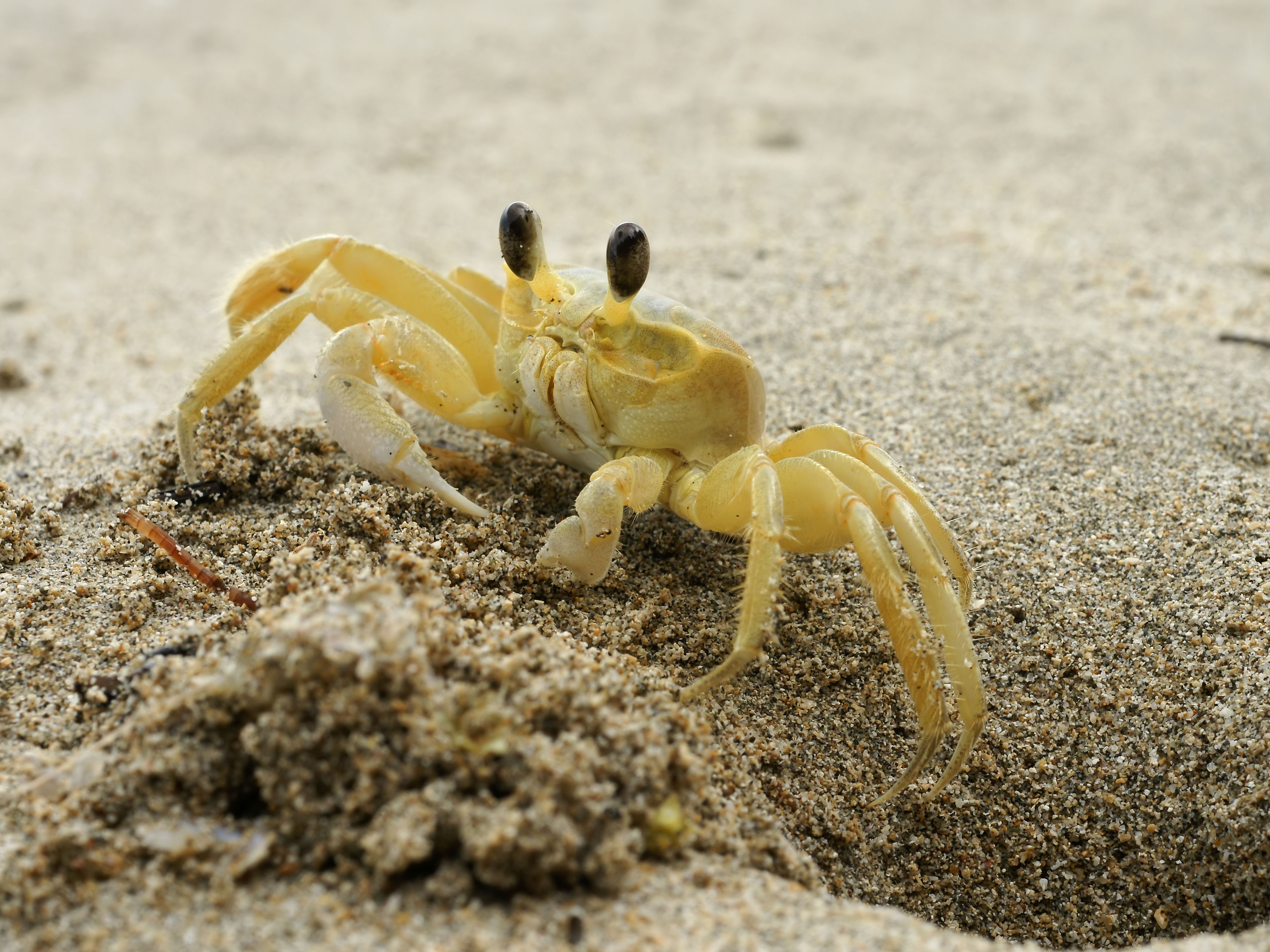
A ghost crab

The marine life found here consists of anemones, urchins, sea cucumbers and eels, which all live on the reefs along with turtles, conch and many varieties of marine fishes. The marine aquafauna is rich in conch, which has pearly-pink shells. Its meat is a favourite food supplement item and their shells are a collector's item. Other species of fish that are recorded close to the shoreline in shallow waters are: sergeant majors, the blue chromis, brown chromis, surgeon fish; blue tangs and trumpet fish.

On the shore are ghost crabs, which live on the beach in small burrowed tunnels made of sand. Hermit crabs live on land but lay eggs in the water, and eat garbage and sewerage. They spend some months in the sea during and after the hatching season.

=== Marine reserve ===
Saint-Barthélemy has a marine nature reserve, known as the Reserve Naturelle that covers 1,200 hectares (4.6 sq mi), and is divided into five zones all around the island to form a network of protected areas. The Reserve includes the bays of Grand Cul de Sac, Colombier, Marigot, Petit Cul de Sac, and Petite Anse and waters around offshore rocks such as Les Gross Islets, Pain de Sucre, Tortue, and Forchue.

The Reserve is designed to protect the islands' coral reefs, seagrass, and endangered marine species, including sea turtles. The Reserve has two levels of protection. The yellow zones of protection are where certain non-extractive activities, like snorkeling and boating, are allowed. The red zones of high protection are where most activities, including SCUBA, are restricted to protect or recover marine life. Anchoring is prohibited in the Reserve. Mooring buoys are in place in some of the protected bays like Colombier.

== Landmarks and architecture ==
As well as Gustavia, the capital of St. Barthélemy, there are many notable places and monuments on the island which testify to the island's colonial history under the Spanish, Swedish, British, and French, and now a French territory.

=== Gustavia ===
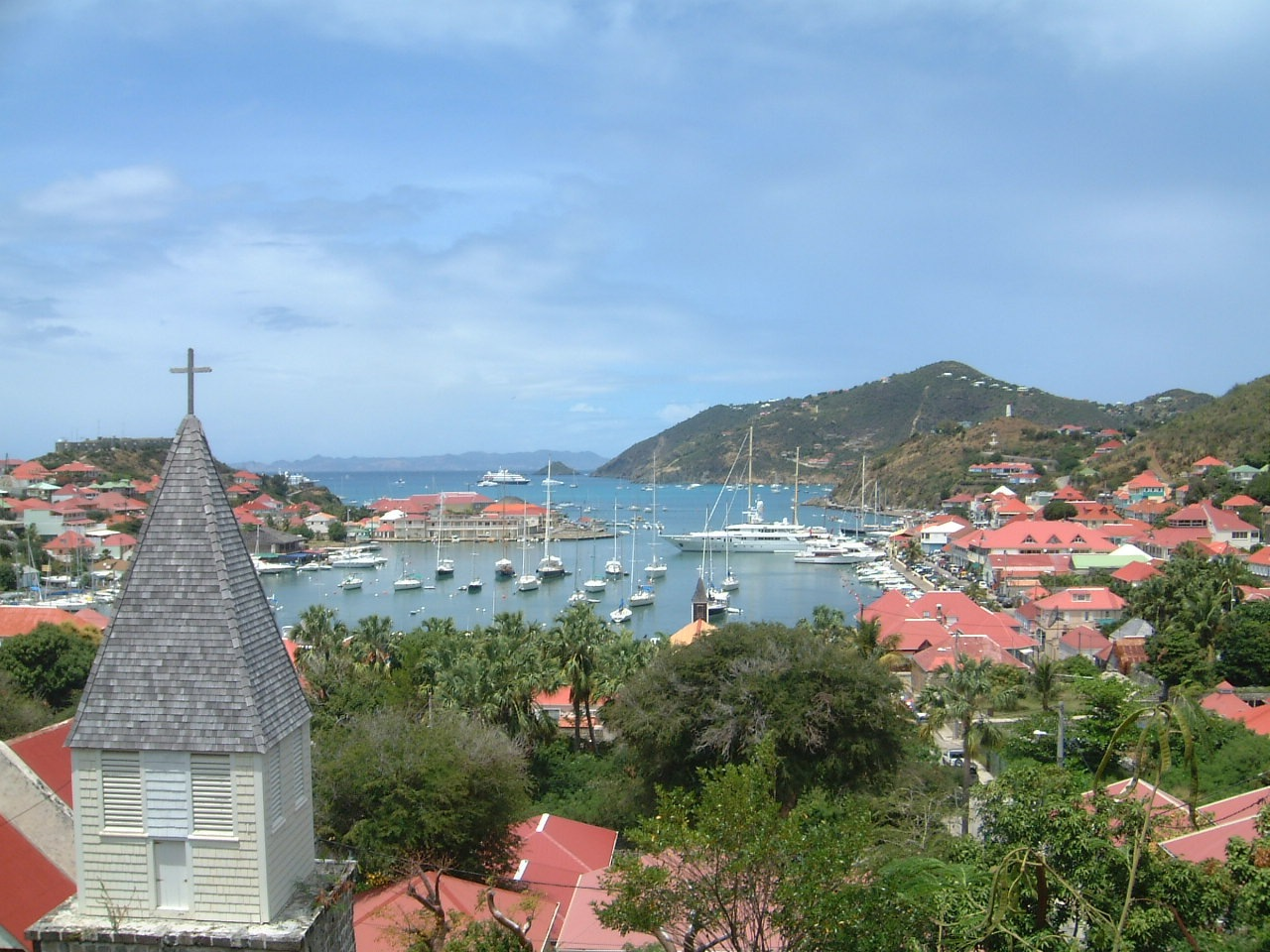
Gustavia Harbour

Gustavia is in a U-shaped cove facing the harbour on the west. The coastal arm of this cove is in a peninsula. The dockyard is on the east side.

When the British invaded the harbour town in 1744, the town's architectural buildings were destroyed. Subsequently, new structures were built in the town around the harbour area. The Swedes added to the architectural beauty of the town in 1785 with more buildings, when they had occupied the town. Prior to their occupation, the port was known as "Carénage".

The Swedes renamed it as Gustavia, in honour of king Gustav III. It was then their prime trading center. The port maintained a neutral stance since the Caribbean war was on in the 18th century. They used it as a trading post of contraband and the city of Gustavia prospered but this prosperity was short-lived.

These buildings underwent further destruction during hurricanes, and also by gutting in 1852. Some monuments are still intact, such as the residence of the then Swedish governor, now the town hall. The oldest colonial structure in the town is stated to be the bell tower, now without a bell, built in 1799, as part of a now destroyed church, in the southeast end of the town on Rue Du Presbytere. Now, a large clock is installed in place of the bell.

The road that runs parallel to the harbour face of the sea, is called the Rue de la Republique. Two roads connect to the two arms of the U-shaped bay. The city has a network of roads, inherited from the Swedish period, laid in a grid pattern, which are either parallel or perpendicular to the three main roads that encompass the bay.

==== Église anglicane de Gustavia ====
Église anglicane de Gustavia, the Saint-Bartholomew Anglican Church, is an important religious building in the town, built in 1855 with stones brought from St Eustatius. It is on one of the town's most elegant roads, called the Rue du Centenaire. It has a bell tower. A rock wall encircles the church.

==== Ancien presbytère de l'église catholique de Gustavia ====
Ancien presbytère de l'église catholique de Gustavia is the Catholic church built in 1822. This church has a bell tower which is separated from the main church, and which rings loud and clear.

==== Musée Territorial de St.-Barthélemy ====
The Musée Territorial de St.-Barthélemy is a museum known as the "St. Barts Municipal Museum" also called the "Wall House" (musée – bibliothèque) in Gustavia, which is located on the far end of La Pointe. The museum is housed in an old stone house, a two-story building that has been refurbished. The island's history relating to the French, Swedish and British periods of occupation is well presented in the museum with photographs, maps, and paintings. Also on display are ancestral costumes, antique tools, models of Creole houses, and ancient fishing boats. It also houses a library.

==== Gustavia Lighthouse ====
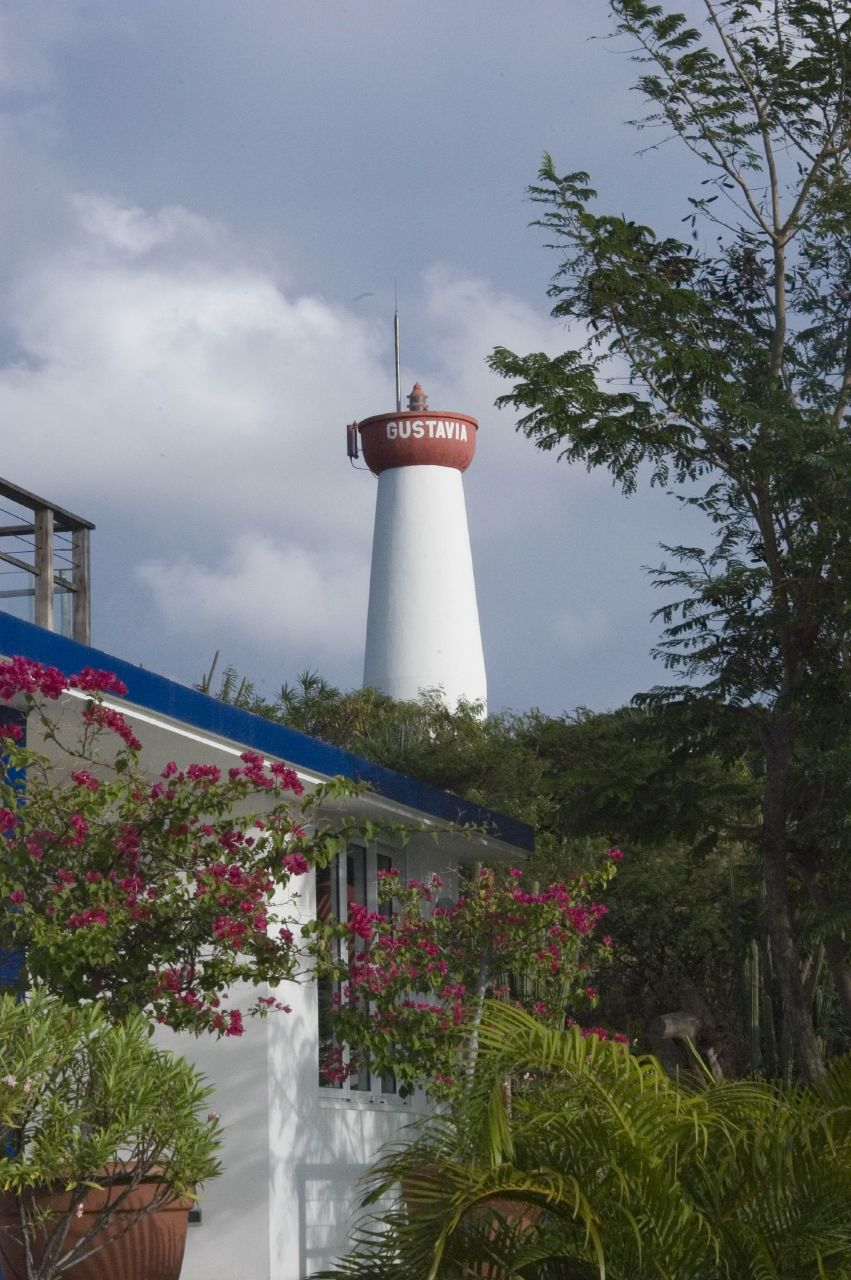
Gustavia Lighthouse

The 9-metre (30 ft) white tower of the Gustavia Lighthouse was built in 1961. Situated on the crest of a hill north of the town, its focal plane is 64 metres (210 ft) above the level of the sea. It flashes every 12 seconds, white, green, or red, depending on direction. The round conical tower has a single red band at the top.

=== Forts ===
Among the notable structures in the town are the three forts built by the Swedes for defense purposes. One of these forts, known as Fort Oscar (formerly Gustav Adolph), which overlooks the sea is located on the far side of La Pointe. The ruins have been replaced by a modern military building, which houses the local gendarmerie.

The other fort known as Fort Karl now presents very few ruins. The third fort built by the Swedes is Fort Gustav, which is also seen in ruins strewn around the weather station and the Light House. The fort built in 1787 over a hill slope has ruins of ramparts, a guardhouse, a munitions depot, and a wood-burning oven.

=== Savaku ===
A statue, Savaku, representing the Arawak peoples is present at Saint-Jean.

== Education ==
The island's public preschools and primary schools, under the authority of the Académie de la Guadeloupe, are

- École primaire Gustavia
- École maternelle Gustavia

Private primary schools:

- École primaire privée Saint Joseph
- École primaire privée Sainte Marie

== Culture ==
=== Festivals and holidays ===
Some of the festivals held each year in St. Barthélemy are:

- The St. Barts Music Festival is held every January, usually during the 2nd and 3rd weeks.
- A French Carnival in February or March held for two weeks before Ash Wednesday and concluding with Ash Wednesday; on Ash Wednesday a black and white parade held at Shell Beach is the occasion of a notional burning of the image of Vaval, the Carnival King.
- St. Barth Film Festival, held annually at the end of April, was established in 1996, and hosts Caribbean films for five days.
- Armistice Day on 8 May.
- Abolition of Slavery Day on 27 May and 9 October.
- Bastille Day on 14 July.
- Victor Schoelcher Day on 21 July, honouring Schoelcher, a French parliamentarian, for his noble humanitarian act of abolishing slavery in French territory on 27 April 1848.
- Assumption Day on 15 August.
- Fête de Saint Barthélemy, the feast day of Saint Barthélemy on 24 August, in honour of the island's patron saint. Church bells are rung, boats are blessed and a regatta is held, followed by fireworks and a public ball.
- Festival of Gustavia held in August, an occasion of dragnet fishing and partying.
- All Saints Day on 1 November
- Remembrance Day (Armistice Day).
- Christmas Day on 25 December and New Year's Eve on 31 December.

Some other festivals held are the Festival Gastronomique (April) and Yacht Festival (May). The national holidays observed are the Bastille Day and St. Barthélemy Day (day of adoption of French Constitution). All Saints Day is held on 1 November when hundreds of candles are lit in the evening hours. All Souls Day is observed on 2 November, and it is a public holiday.

=== Music ===
The Caribbean is the birthplace of calypso, méringue, soca, zouk and reggae music, which significantly influence the culture. The St. Barthélemy Music Festival is a major international performing arts event held every year.

=== Cinema ===
Film director Dylan Verrechia is originally from St. Barthélemy.

=== Cuisine ===
French cuisine, West Indian cuisine, Creole cuisine, Italian cuisine and Asian cuisine are common in St. Barthélemy. The island has over 70 restaurants serving many dishes and others are a significant number of gourmet restaurants; many of the finest restaurants are located in the hotels. There are also several snack restaurants which the French call "les snacks" or "les petits creux" which include sandwiches, pizzas, and salads.

In West Indian cuisine, steamed vegetables with fresh fish is common; Creole dishes tend to be spicier The island hosts gastronomic events throughout the year, with dishes such as spring roll of shrimp and bacon, fresh grilled lobster, Chinese noodle salad with coconut milk, and grilled beef fillet, etc.

In the early 1990s, the island had two cooking schools: the Saint Barts Cooking School which emphasizes classical French cuisine, and Cooking in Paradise, which emphasizes creole cuisine.

=== Fashion ===
A traditional costume, seen only among older women, consists of starched white bonnets called kichnottes.

=== Legend ===
A popular legend related to St. Barthélemy is of a seafarer hooligan looking to loot Spanish ships. French pirate Daniel Montbars, who was given the epithet "Montbars the Exterminator", took shelter in St. Barthélemy during his pirate operations and hid the loot in the sandy coves at Anse du Gouverneur.

== Sports ==
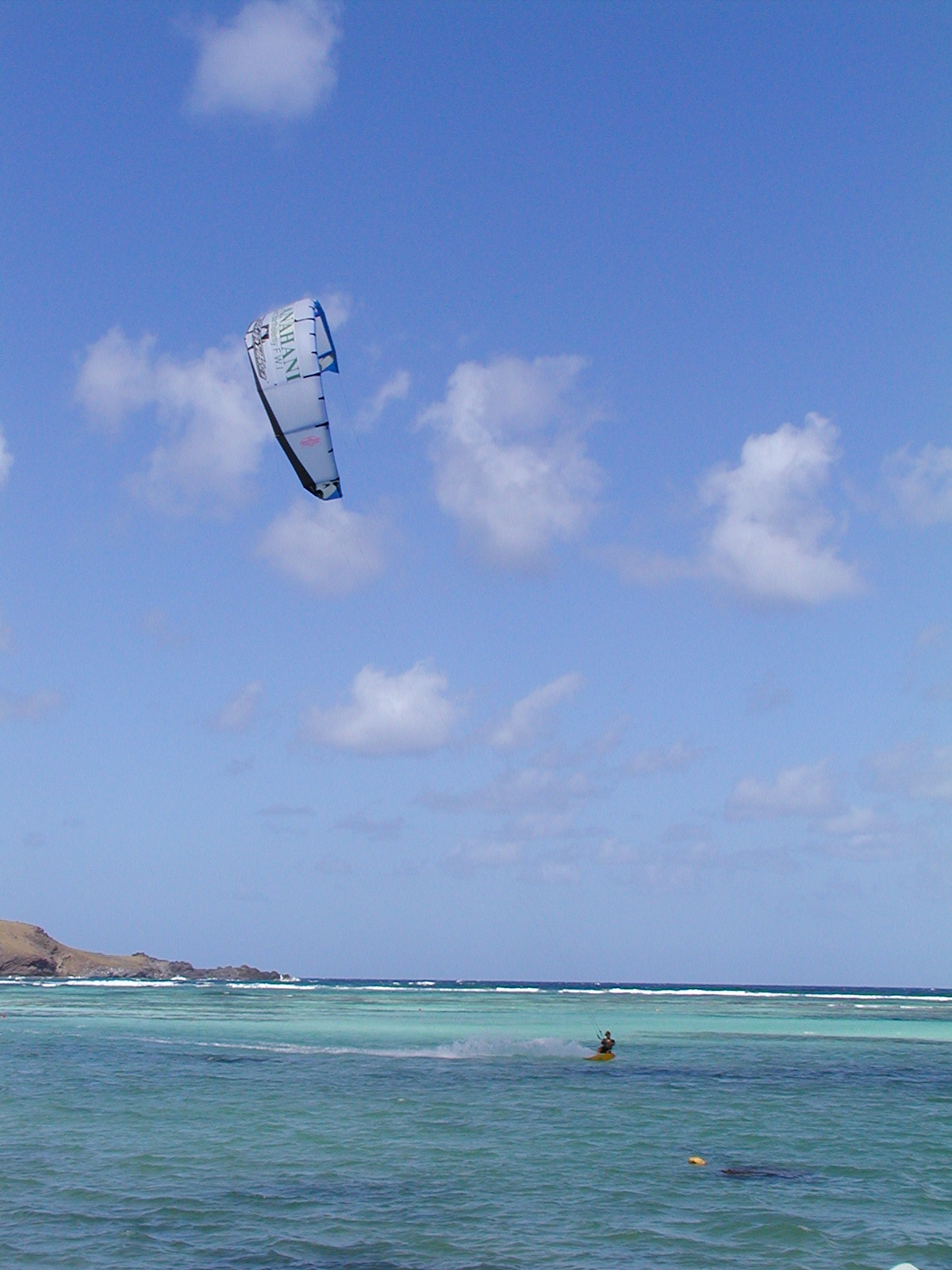
Kitesurfing at Baie de Saint-Jean

Rugby is a popular sport on the island. One of the major teams on the island is "Les Barracudas", named after the ferocious fish of the Caribbean. They often play teams from Anguilla and other surrounding islands.

Gustavia is known as a haven for yachting, with many events being held there each year. These include the St Barths Bucket Regatta, the Saint Barth's Cup and Les Voiles de St. Barth in April, and the International Regatta in May. Deep sea fishing is undertaken from the waterfront of Lorient, Flamands, and Corossol to fish for tuna, marlin, bonito, barracuda and wahoo. St Barth Open Fishing tournament is held in July.

The Transat AG2R Race, held every alternate year, is an event that originates in Concarneau in Brittany, France, reaching St. Barthélemy. It is a boat race with boats of 10-metre (33-foot) length with a single hull and with essential safety equipment. Each boat is navigated by two sailors.

Kitesurfing and other water sports have become popular on the island in recent years, especially at Grand Cul-de-Sac beach (Baie de Grand Cul de Sac) for windy sports as kitesurfing and Saint Jean Beach (Baie de Saint Jean), Lorient, Toiny and Anse des Cayes for surfing. Tennis is popular on the island and it has several tennis clubs, Tennis Clube de Flamboyant in Grand Cul-de-Sac, AJOE Tennis Club in Orient, and ASCO in Colombier.

The Swedish Marathon Race, also called the Gustavialoppet, is held in December. Races of 2 kilometres (1.2 mi) and 12 kilometres (7.5 mi) are conducted when children, women, and men participate in the races.

Saint Barthelemy has a national football team, though it is not currently a member of CONCACAF or the Caribbean Football Union.

== Transport ==
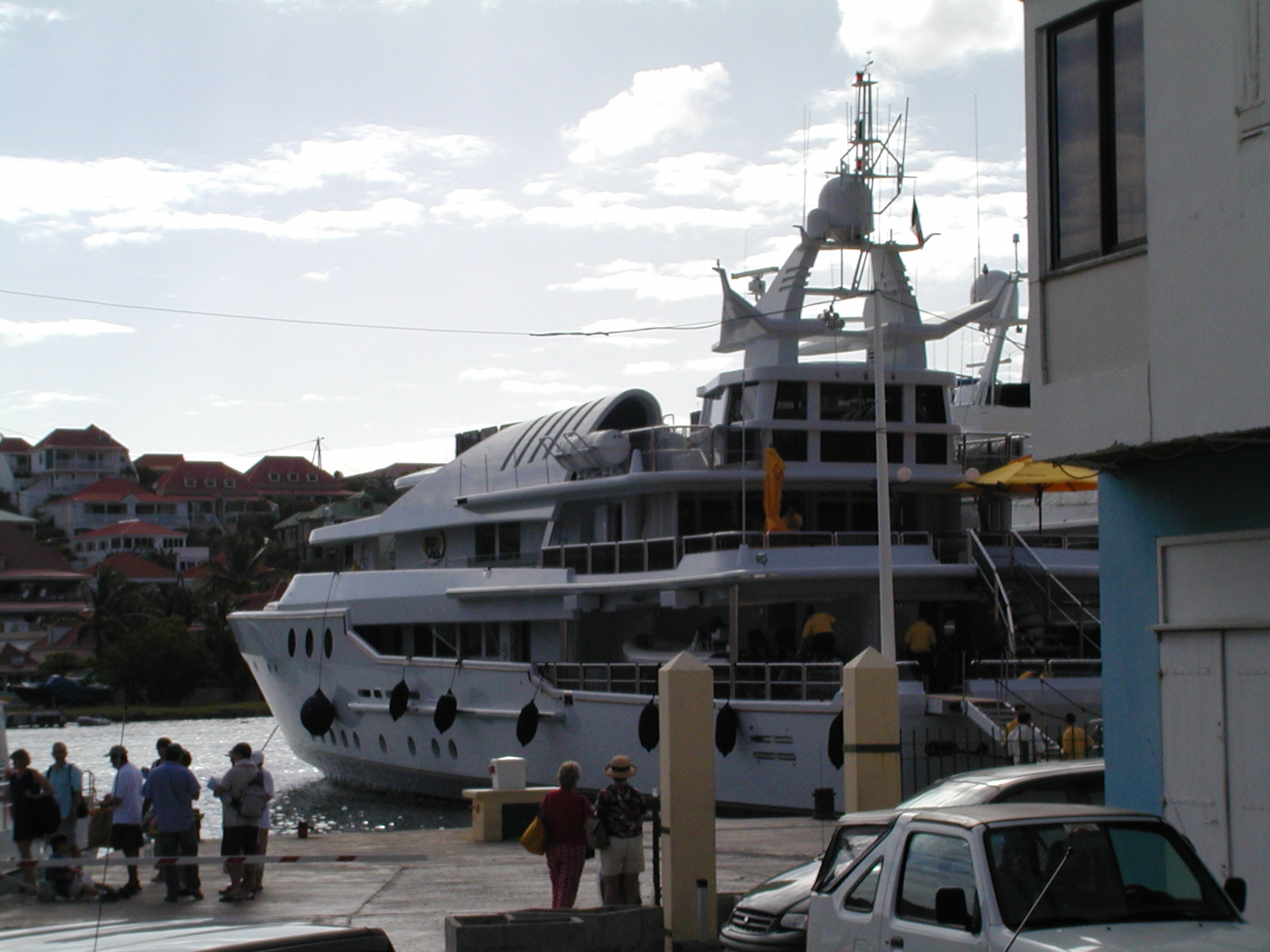
A private boat docked in St. Barts

Aeroport Saint Barthélemy Remy de Haenen (Gustaf III Airport) is small with a runway length of 646 meters (2,119 ft). Airport codes: SBH (IATA), TFFJ (ICAO). The airport is served by regional commercial aircraft and charters of up to 19 passengers, as well as helicopters. In 2022 the airport recorded 218,984 passengers and 44,521 aircraft movements. A traffic peak of 280 aircraft movements per day was recorded on 2 January 2022, and 323 aircraft on 2 January 2023; 58% of the passengers for destination St. Barth arrive on international commercial airlines and large private jets mainly via the neighboring island Sint Maarten's Princess Juliana International Airport, while 15% arrive via San Juan, Puerto Rico, and 13% via Guadeloupe. St. Barth has its own airline, St. Barth Commuter, which in addition to the scheduled and charter flight services, provides medical transport services. St. Barth Executive is a local aircraft charter operator.

Many inter-island ferry services operate regularly between St. Martin and St. Barts. There are three ferry services active at the moment, one is operated by Voyager (which leaves from Marigot) one day-trip ferry by the Edge (Leaving from Simpsons Bay) and one regular ferry service by the Great Bay Ferry from Philipsburg.

The narrow and congested roads, and difficulty in parking, have been an impetus for driving Smart cars.

== Media ==
A weekly journal entitled Journal de St. Barth is published in French. Its English-language abridged version, St Barth Weekly, is published only during the winter. Reflecting the island's popularity with the rich, the high-fashion magazine L'Officiel publishes a seasonal local edition 35.

There are two local TV broadcasters and five FM radio channels (2021). There is a 4G/LTE mobile service since 2019.

== Health facilities ==
The island has a small hospital, the Hôpital de Bruyn, in Gustavia with an adjacent diagnostic laboratory. There is also at least one private diagnostic facility. Specialists in cardiology, general medicine, ear-nose-and-throat medicine, obstetrics and gynaecology, paediatrics, and rheumatology are also available, as well as dentists. Many pharmacies dispense medicines. For more advanced facilities, patients go to Guadeloupe, the United States, San Juan or France.

== Notable people ==
- Eugénie Blanchard (1896–2010) was the world's oldest living person (114 years, 261 days) at the time of her death. She was born on St. Barthélemy and spent most of her life on Curaçao and St. Barthélemy as a Catholic nun.
- Johnny Hallyday (1943–2017), the French musician and actor chose to be buried on St. Barthélemy in the cemetery of Lorient, Saint Barthélemy parish church
- Bettina Cointre, French politician, is from St. Barthélemy.

== See also ==
- Outline of Saint Barthélemy
- Index of Saint Barthélemy-related articles
