= Anse des Cayes =

- Quartier
- The quartier of Anse des Cayes marked 9.
- Coordinates: 17°54′46″N 62°50′46″W
- Country: France
- Overseas collectivity: Saint Barthélemy

Anse des Cayes is a quartier of Saint Barthélemy in the Caribbean. It is located in the northwestern part of the island.
