= Sous le Vent Parish =

Coordinates: 17.9116°N 62.8549°W

Sous le Vent
- Parish
- Interactive map of Sous le Vent
- Country: France
- Overseas collectivity: Saint Barthélemy

Sous le Vent (French pronunciation: [su lə vɑ̃], "Downwind") is a parish of Saint Barthélemy in the Caribbean.It governs 20 blocks west of Saint Barthélemy.
