= Corossol =

- Quartier
- The quartier of Corossol marked 5.
- Coordinates: 17°54′30″N 62°51′22″W
- Country: France
- Overseas collectivity: Saint Barthélemy

Corossol (French pronunciation: [kɔʁɔsɔl]) is a quartier of Saint Barthélemy in the Caribbean. It is located in the northwestern part of the island. The quartiers' language is Norman.
