= Marigot, Saint Barthélemy =

Marigot
- Quartier
- The quartier of Marigot, Saint Barthélemy marked 38.
- Coordinates: 17°54′47″N 62°48′33″W
- Country: France
- Overseas collectivity: Saint Barthélemy

Marigot (French pronunciation: [maʁiɡo]) is a quartier of the French overseas collectivity of Saint Barthélemy in the Caribbean. Located in the northeastern part of the island, it is known for it grey sandy beaches and coves, which forms part of a protected marine ecosystem.

== History ==
Saint Barthélemy was originally inhabited by Arawak and then Carib Indians. Christopher Columbus arrived here in 1493 and named the island for his brother Bartoloméo. French attempts to settle the region began in 1648, which they succeeded. In 1784, France traded the island to Sweden, which lasted until 1878 when the island was sold back to France. In 2003, the population voted to secede from Guadeloupe to form a separate overseas collectivity, which officially took effect on 22 February 2007.

Marigot was developed by the Edmond Adolphe de Rothschild after he bought a 7.5 acres (3.0 ha) piece of land in the area in 1957, after being introduced to St. Barth by David Rockefeller. Edmond’s son Benjamin de Rothschild built two villas, which were later sold to Bruce Kovner. Kovner sold the in 2017 for $67 million.

== Geography ==
Marigot is a quartier on the island of Saint Barthélemy in the Lesser Antilles in the eastern Caribbean Sea, located east of the US Virgin Islands. Marigot has the only grey sand beach in St. Barth. The nearby cove is part of St. Barth’s marine reserve protected area. The region has a tropical climate, with warm and dry summer from December to April and the wet season from May to November. Fishing is prohibited in the area due to its status of a protected reserve. There are several shallow natural pools amidst the cliffs, that were formed by wave action over volcanic rocks. These pools are often used for swimming, and snorkeling activities.
