= Publique, Saint Barthélemy =

Publique
- Quartier
- The quartier of Public, Saint Barthélemy marked 11.
- Coordinates: 17°54′12″N 62°51′5″W
- Country: France
- Overseas collectivity: Saint Barthélemy

Public (French pronunciation: [pyblik]) is a quartier of Saint Barthélemy in the Caribbean. In the western part of the island, situated 180 km to the North-West of St.John's, around 90 km North-West from the St. Kitts and Nevis border. it is one of its most densely inhabited and active areas. It is north of the main centre of Gustavia and functions as its industrial zone.

== Climate ==
An average temperature of 27 °C throughout the year, summer season experience from December to April, and May onwards till November is the rainy season. Thunder, heavy rains and cyclone occur during this period.

== Places around ==
There are some places near the Public, to visit.

- Pic Paradis
- Anguilla
- Saba
- The Quill (Volcano)
