= Anse du Gouverneur =

- Quartier and beach
- The quartier of Anse du Gouverneur marked 24.
- Coordinates: 17°53′6″N 62°49′39″W
- Country: France
- Overseas collectivity: Saint Barthélemy

Anse du Gouverneur (French pronunciation: [ɑ̃s dy ɡuvɛʁnœʁ]) is a quartier and beach of Saint Barthélemy in the Caribbean. It is located in the southern part of the island.
