= Grande Saline, Saint Barthélemy =

Grande Saline
- Quartier
- The quartier of Grande Saline, Saint Barthélemy marked 27.
- Coordinates: 17°53′50″N 62°48′54″W
- Country: France
- Overseas collectivity: Saint Barthélemy

Grande Saline (French pronunciation: [ɡʁɑ̃d salin]) is a quartier of Saint Barthélemy in the Caribbean. It is located in the southern-central part of the island.
