= Anse des Flamands =

- Quartier
- The quartier of Flamands marked 2.
- Coordinates: 17°55′8″N 62°51′33″W
- Country: France
- Overseas collectivity: Saint Barthélemy

Flamands (French pronunciation: [flamɑ̃]) is a quartier of Saint Barthélemy in the Caribbean. It is located in the northwestern part of the island.
