= Index of Saint Barthélemy–related articles =

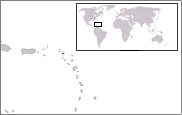
The location of the French overseas collectivity of Saint Barthélemy

The following is an alphabetical list of topics related to the French overseas collectivity of Saint Barthélemy.

== 0–9 ==
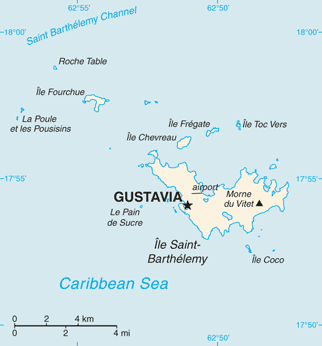
A map of Saint Barthélemy

- .bl – Internet country code top-level domain for Saint-Barthélemy

== A ==
- Americas
  - North America
    - North Atlantic Ocean
      - West Indies
        - Mer des Caraïbes (Caribbean Sea)
          - Antilles
            - Petites Antilles (Lesser Antilles)
              - Islands of Saint Barthélemy
- Antilles
- Atlas of Saint-Barthélemy

== C ==
- Capital of Saint Barthélemy: Gustavia
- Caribbean
- Caribbean Sea
- Categories:
  - Category:Saint Barthélemy
    - Category:Buildings and structures in Saint Barthélemy
    - Category:Communications in Saint Barthélemy
    - Category:Economy of Saint Barthélemy
    - Category:Geography of Saint Barthélemy
    - The Coat of arms of Saint Barthélemy
    - Category:History of Saint Barthélemy
    - Category:Politics of Saint Barthélemy
    - Category:Saint Barthélemy culture
    - Category:Saint Barthélemy-related lists
    - Category:Society of Saint Barthélemy
    - Category:Transport in Saint Barthélemy
  - commons:Category:Saint Barthélemy
- Coat of arms of Saint Barthélemy
- Collectivité de Saint-Barthélemy (French overseas collectivity of Saint Barthélemy)
- Communications in Saint Barthélemy

== D ==
- Demographics of Saint Barthélemy

== E ==
- Economy of Saint Barthélemy
- Eugenie Blanchard
- European colonization of the Americas

== F ==
The Flag of France

- Flag of France
- Flag of Saint Barthélemy
- France
- French America
- French colonization of the Americas
- French language
- French overseas collectivity of Saint Barthélemy (Collectivité de Saint-Barthélemy)
- French Republic (République française)
- French West Indies

== G ==
- Geography of Saint Barthélemy
- Gustavia – Capital of Saint Barthélemy

== H ==
- History of Saint Barthélemy

== I ==
- Île Saint-Barthélemy
- International Organization for Standardization (ISO)
  - ISO 3166-1 alpha-2 country code for Saint-Barthélemy: BL
  - ISO 3166-1 alpha-3 country code for Saint-Barthélemy: BLM
- Islands of Saint Barthélemy:
  - Saint Barthélemy
  - Île Boulanger
  - Île Chevreau
  - Île Coco
  - Île du Pain de sucre
  - Île Fourche
  - Île Frégate
  - Île Mancel
  - Île Pelé
  - Île Toc Vers
  - Îles des Grenadins
  - Roche le Boeuf
  - Roche Plate

== L ==
- Lists related to Saint Barthélemy:
  - List of airports in Saint Barthélemy
  - List of islands of Saint Barthélemy
  - List of political parties in Saint Barthélemy
  - List of Saint Barthélemy-related topics

== P ==
- Politics of Saint Barthélemy
- Possessions of Sweden

== R ==
- République française (French Republic)

== S ==
- Saint-Barthélemy (Saint Barthélemy, Saint Barts)
- Scouting in Saint Barthélemy
- Swedish colonization of the Americas
- Swedish slave trade

== T ==
- Topic outline of Saint Barthélemy
- Transport in Saint Barthélemy

== W ==
- Wikimedia Atlas of Saint Barthélemy
- Wikipedia:WikiProject Topic outline/Drafts/Topic outline of Saint Barthélemy

== See also ==
- List of Caribbean-related topics
- List of international rankings
- Lists of country-related topics
- Topic outline of geography
- Topic outline of North America
- Topic outline of Saint Barthélemy
