= List of amphibians and reptiles of Anguilla =

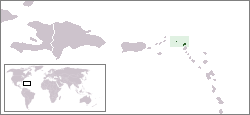
Location of Anguilla in the Caribbean

This is a list of amphibians and reptiles found in the British overseas territory of Anguilla, located in the Lesser Antilles chain in the Caribbean. It comprises the main island of Anguilla, and many much smaller islands and cays that have no permanent human population.

== Amphibians ==
There are two species of amphibian on Anguilla, both of which were introduced.

=== Frogs (Anura) ===
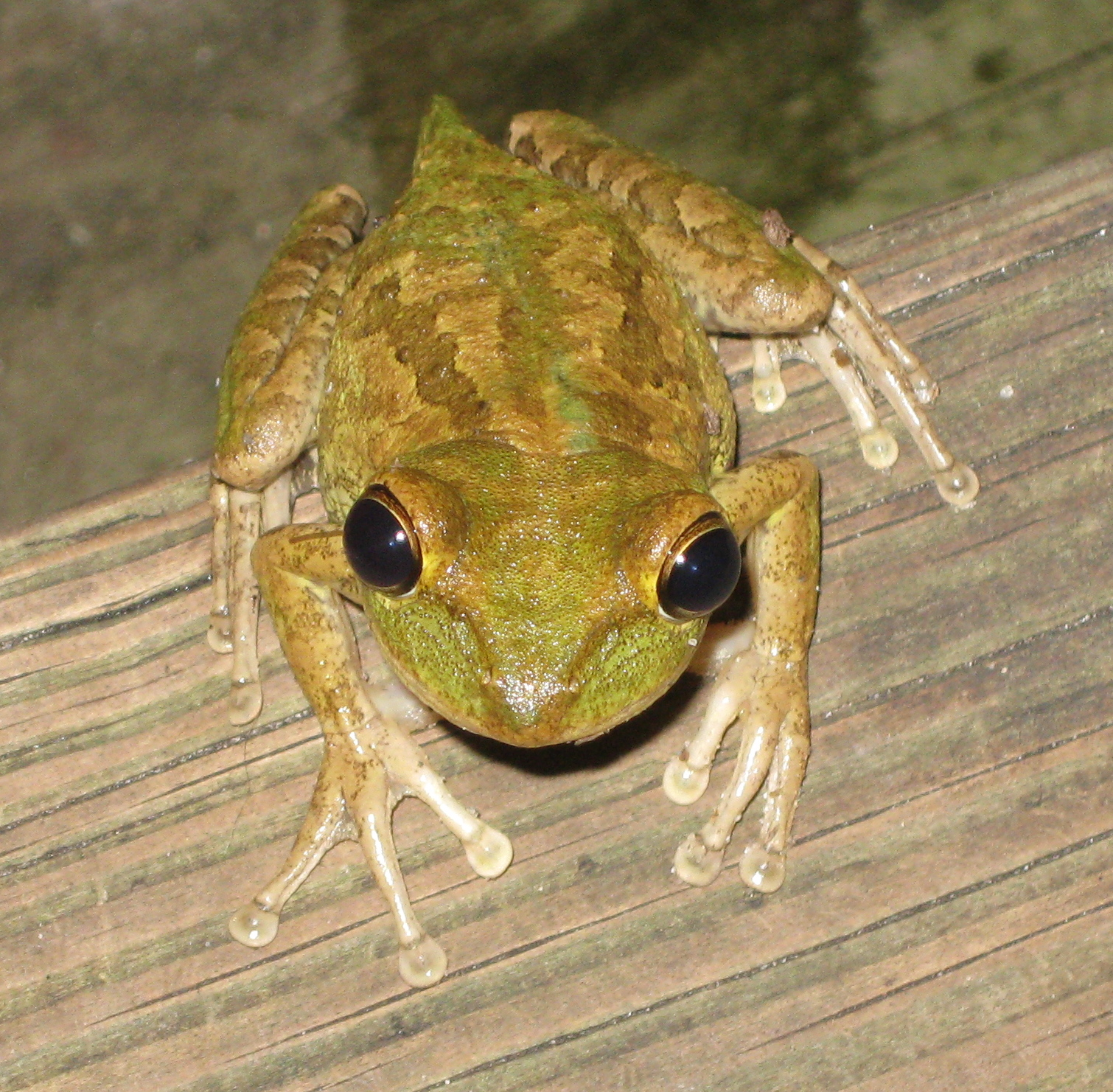
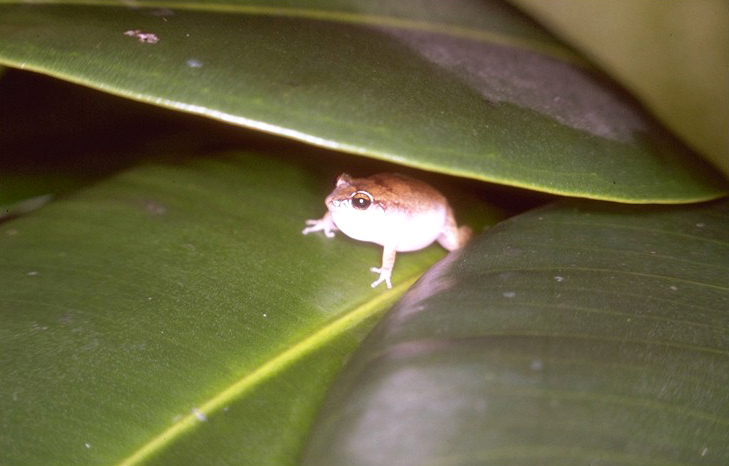
Tree frogs (Hylidae)
Species	Common name(s)	Notes	Image
Osteopilus septentrionalis	Cuban tree frog	Least Concern. Recently introduced, mostly through shipping containers; now "firmly established" on Anguilla.
Tropical frogs (Leptodactylidae)
Species	Common name(s)	Notes	Image
Eleutherodactylus johnstonei	Lesser Antillean whistling frog, coqui Antillano, Johnstone's whistling frog	Least Concern. Recently introduced.

== Reptiles ==
Including marine turtles and introduced species, there are 19 reptile species reported on Anguilla. Two are endemic and are restricted to small, uninhabited satellite islands: Censky's Ameiva (Pholidoscelis corax) and the Sombrero Ameiva (Pholidoscelis corvina).

=== Turtles (Testudines) ===
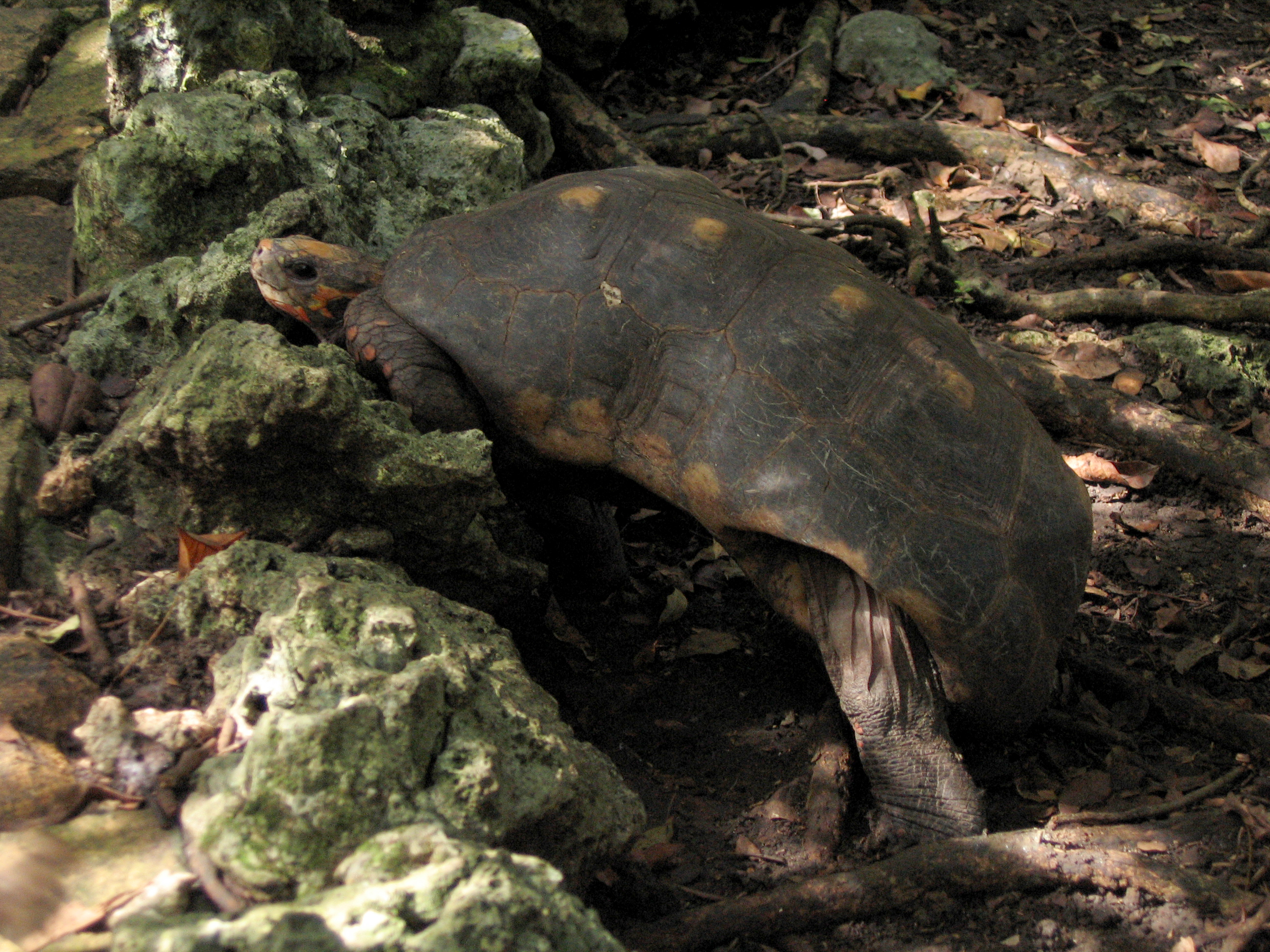
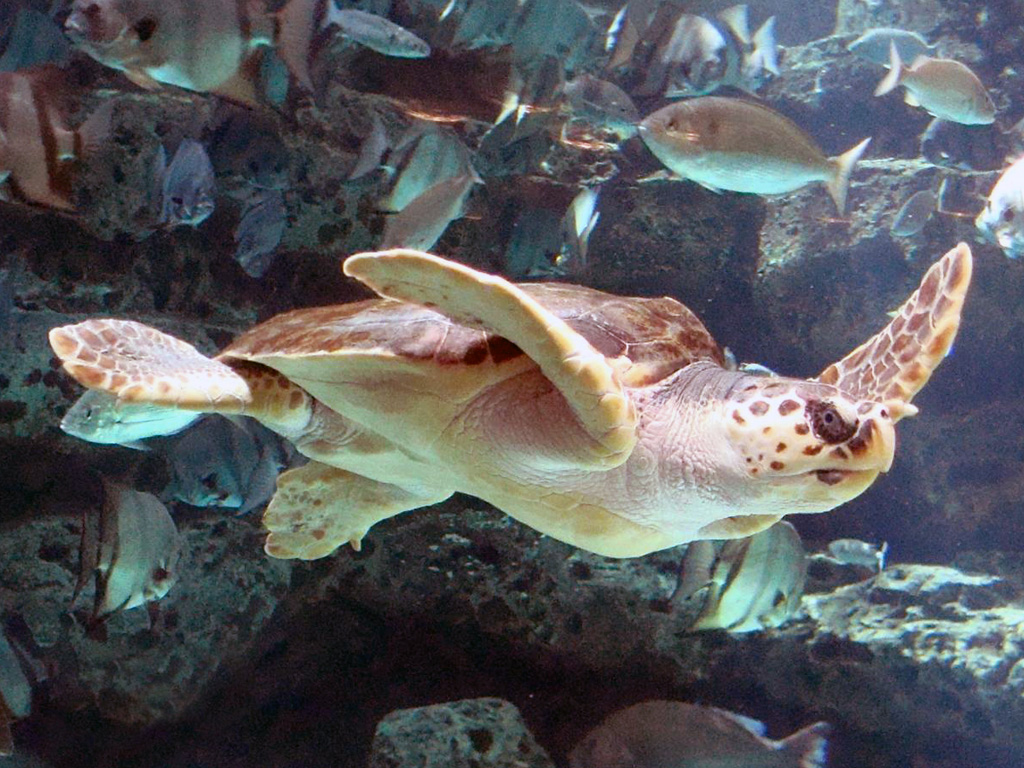
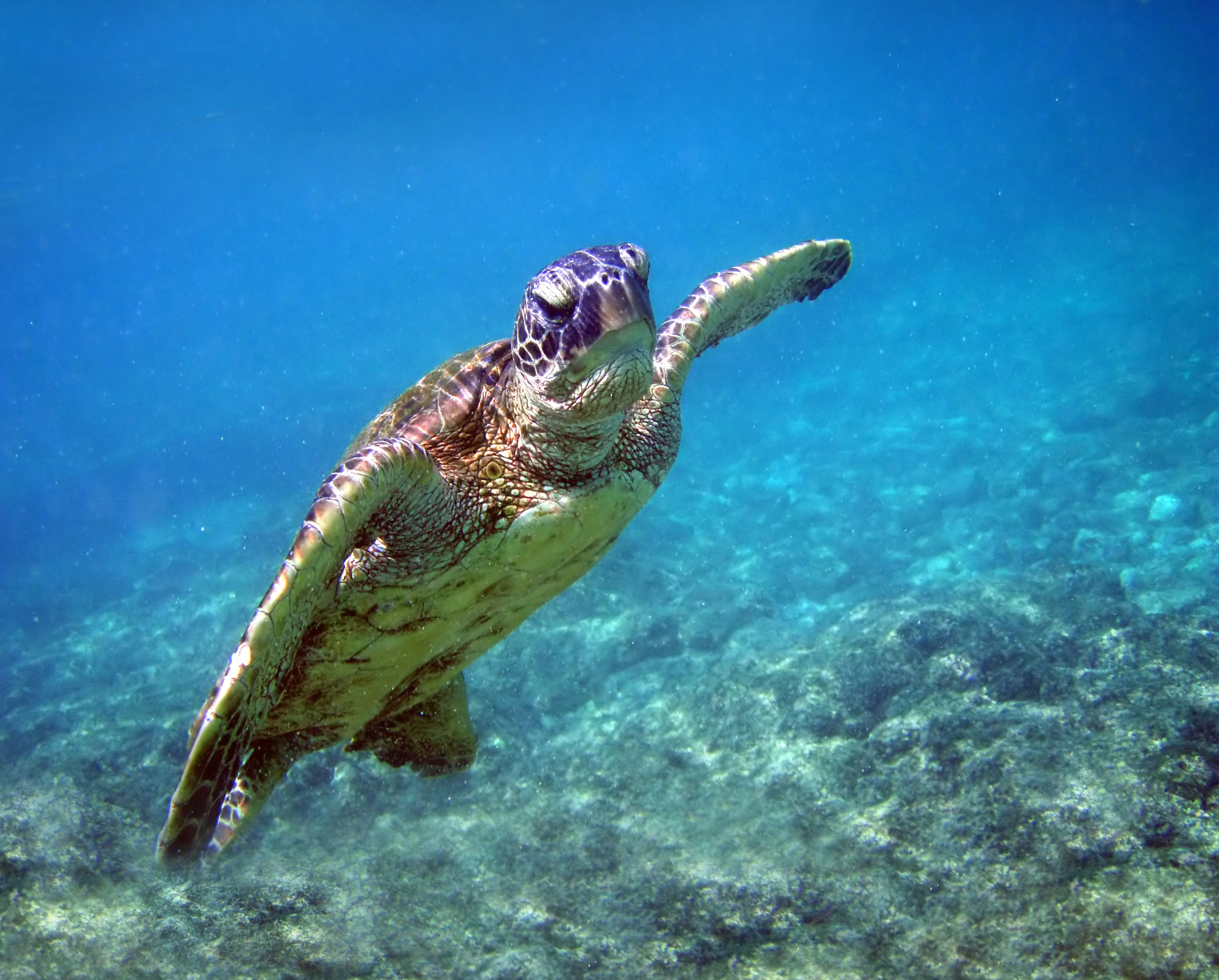
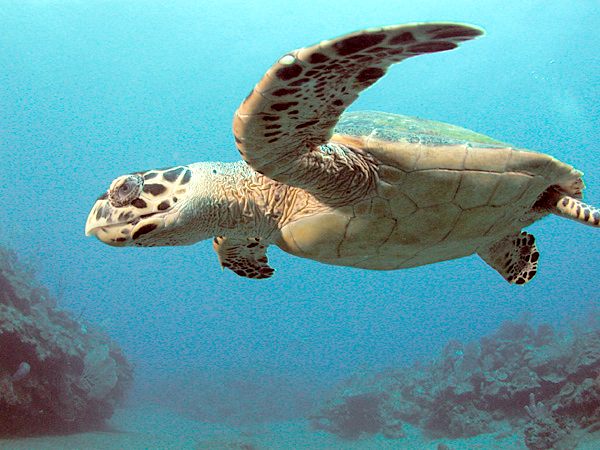
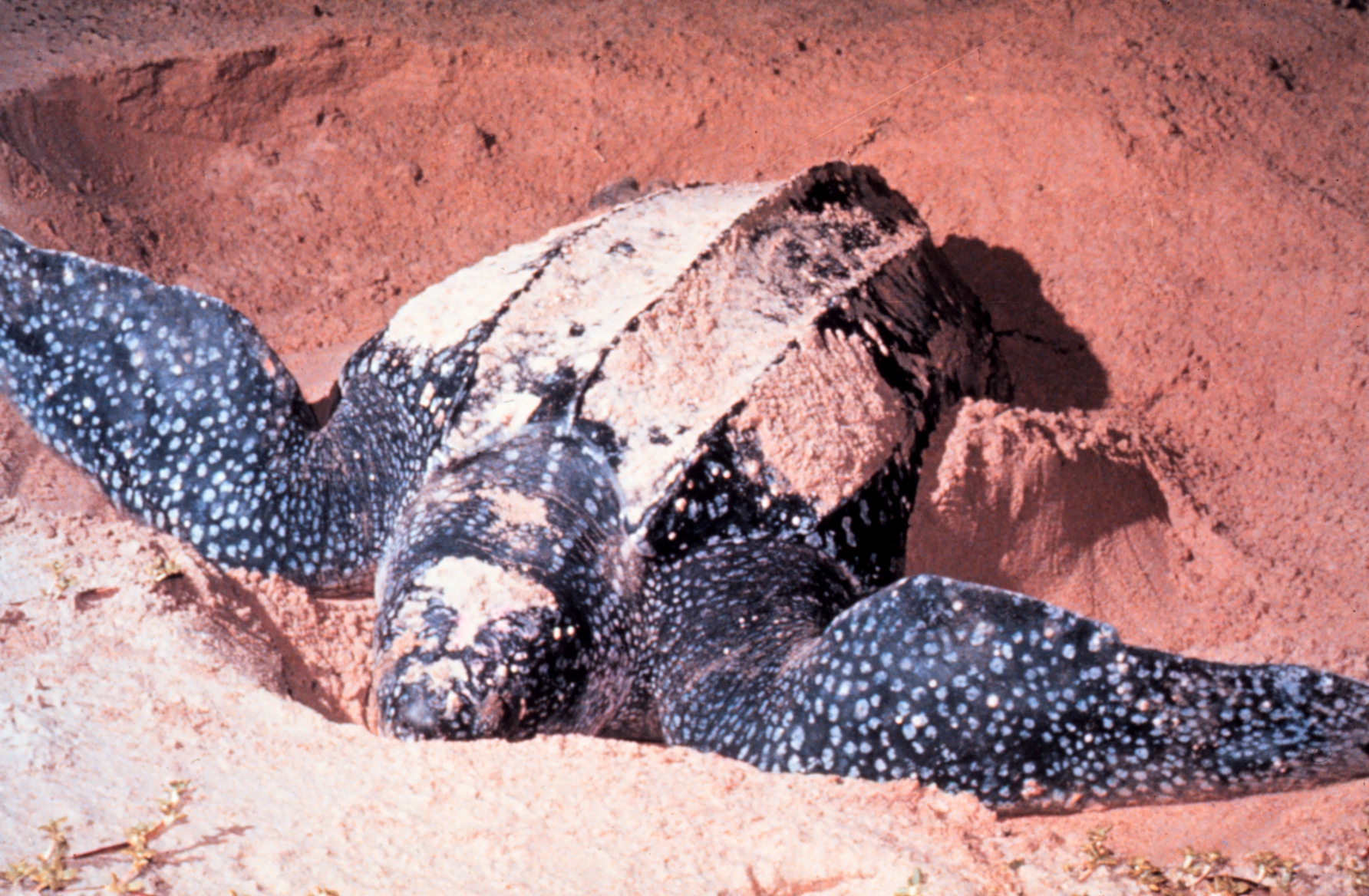
Tortoises (Testudinidae)
Species	Common name(s)	Notes	Image
Geochelone carbonaria	Red-footed tortoise
Scaly sea turtles (Cheloniidae)
Species	Common name(s)	Notes	Image
Caretta caretta	Loggerhead turtle	Endangered. No reliable reports of nesting in Anguilla.
Chelonia mydas	Green turtle	Endangered. Recorded nesting in Anguilla, principally on Dog Island and the Prickly Pear Cays.
Eretmochelys imbricata	Hawksbill turtle	Critically Endangered. The principal nesting turtle species in Anguilla, with important sites on the main island, Dog Island, and the Prickly Pear Cays. A year-round forager.
Leathery sea turtles (Dermochelyidae)
Species	Common name(s)	Notes	Image
Dermochelys coriacea	Leatherback turtle	Critically Endangered. Rare in Anguilla. Recorded nesting on the main island and Scrub Island.

=== Lizards and snakes (Squamata) ===
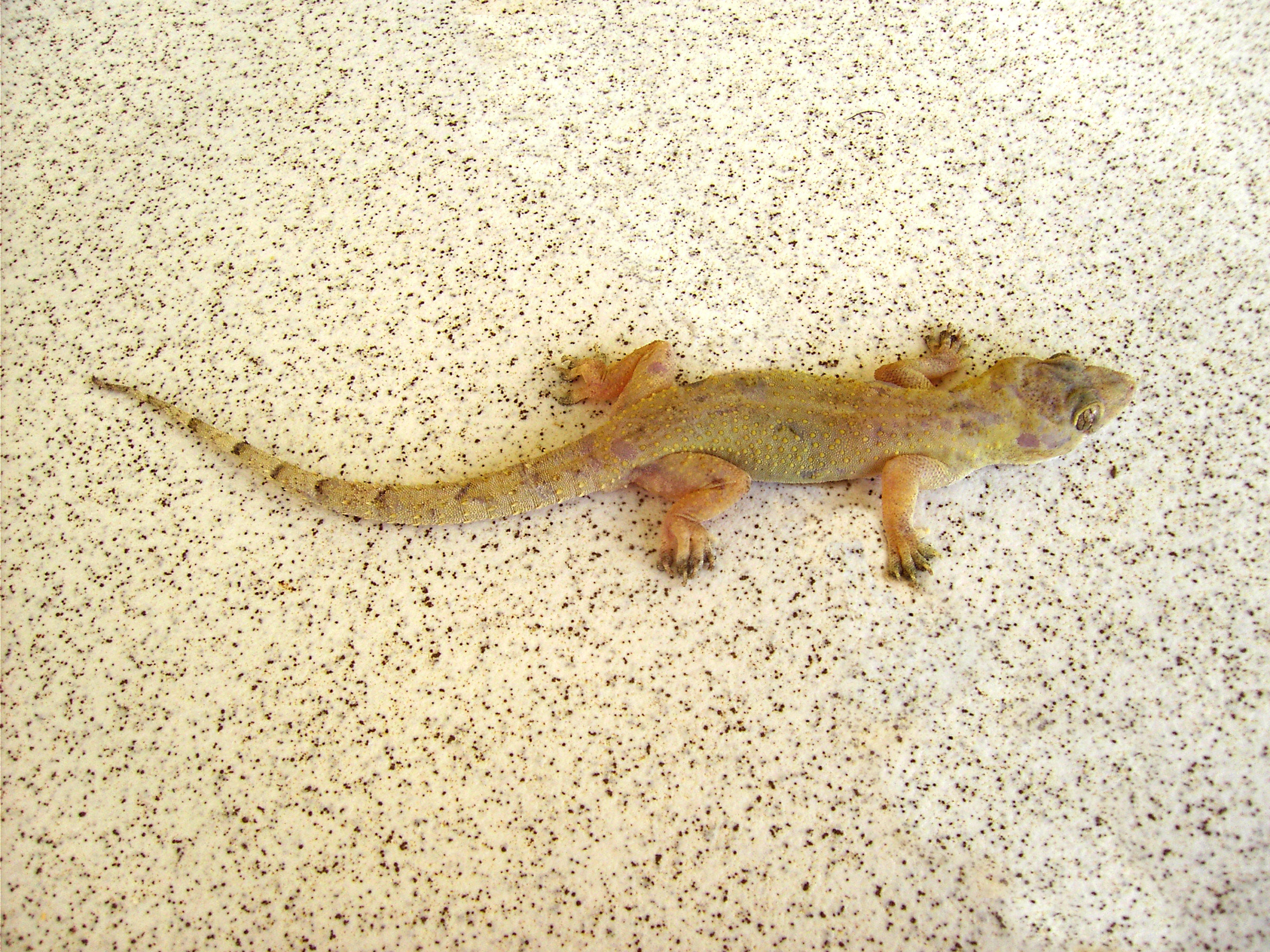
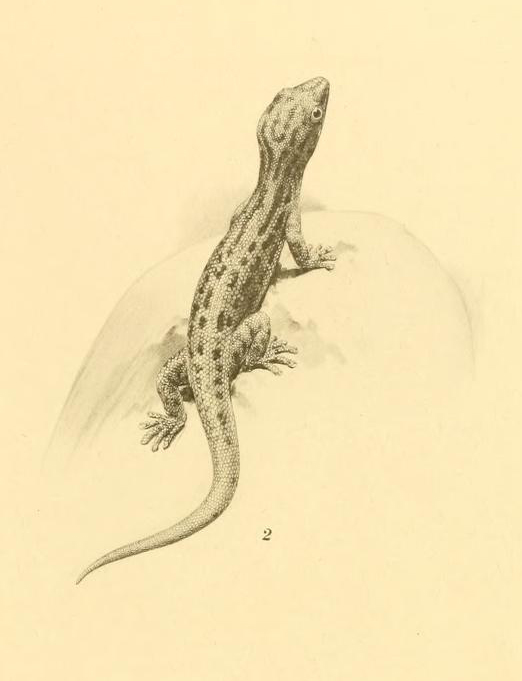
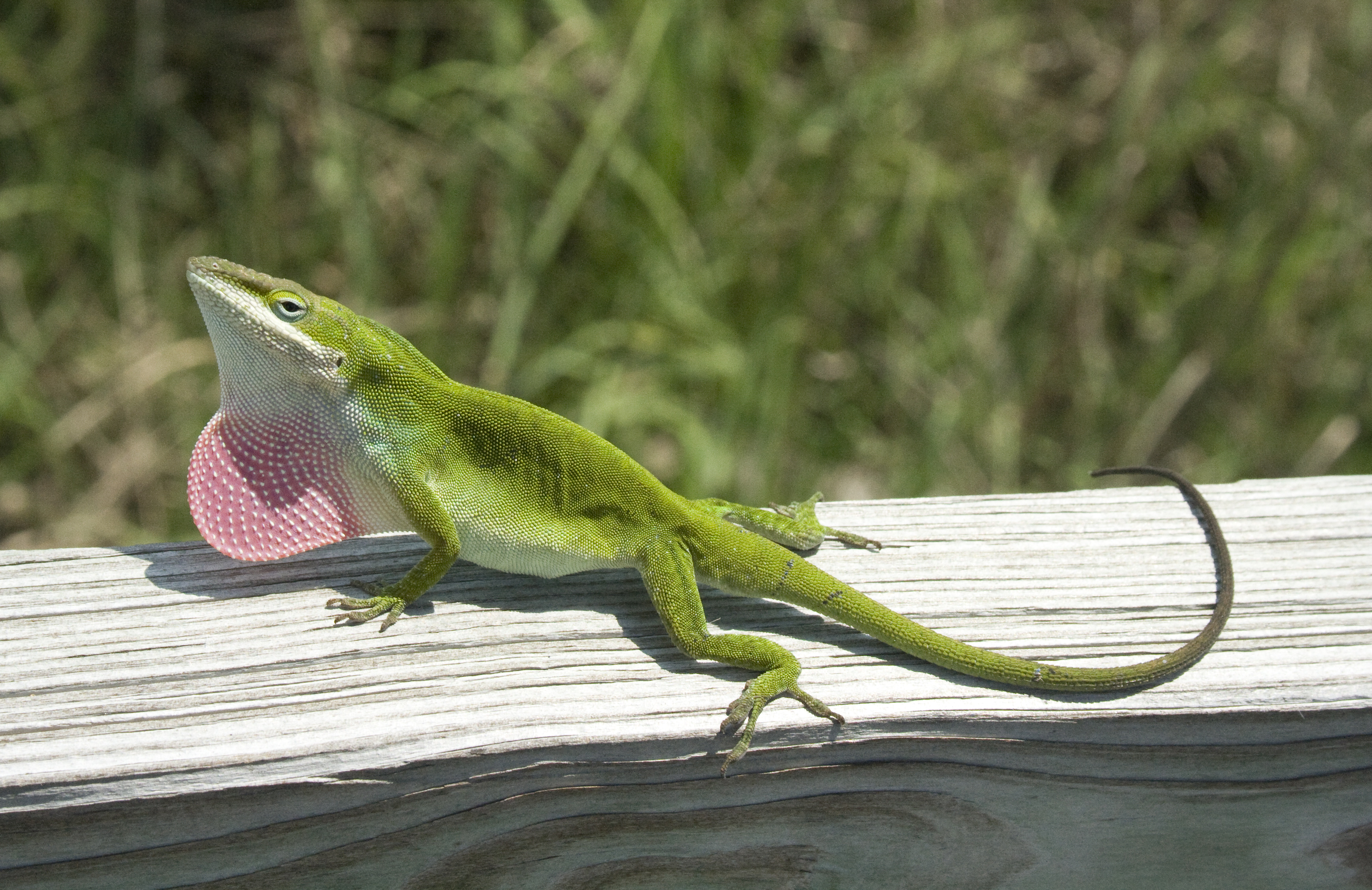
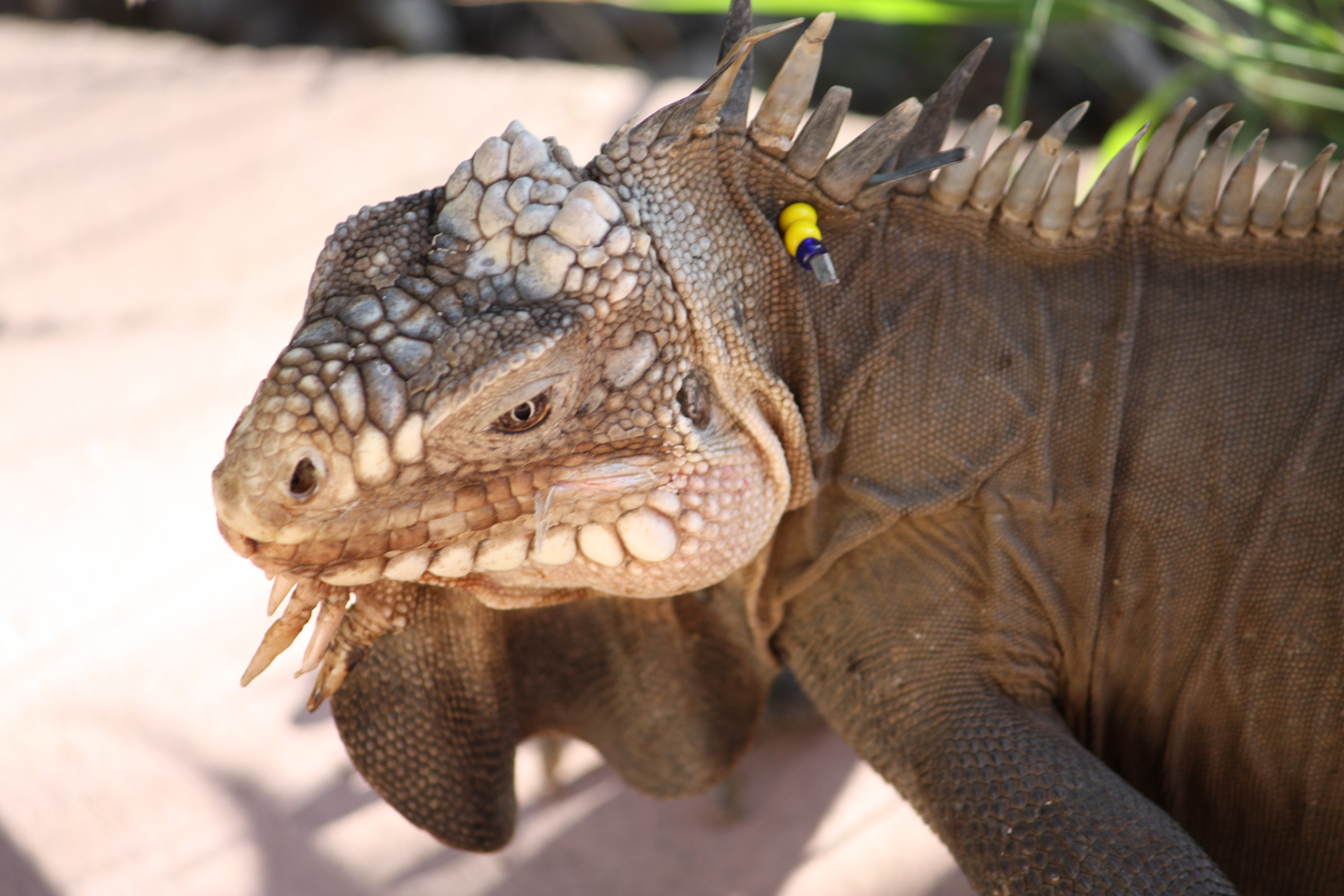
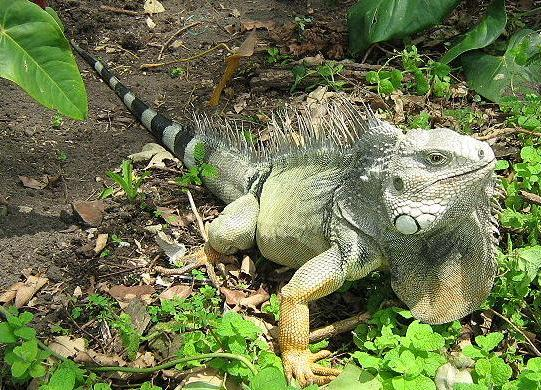
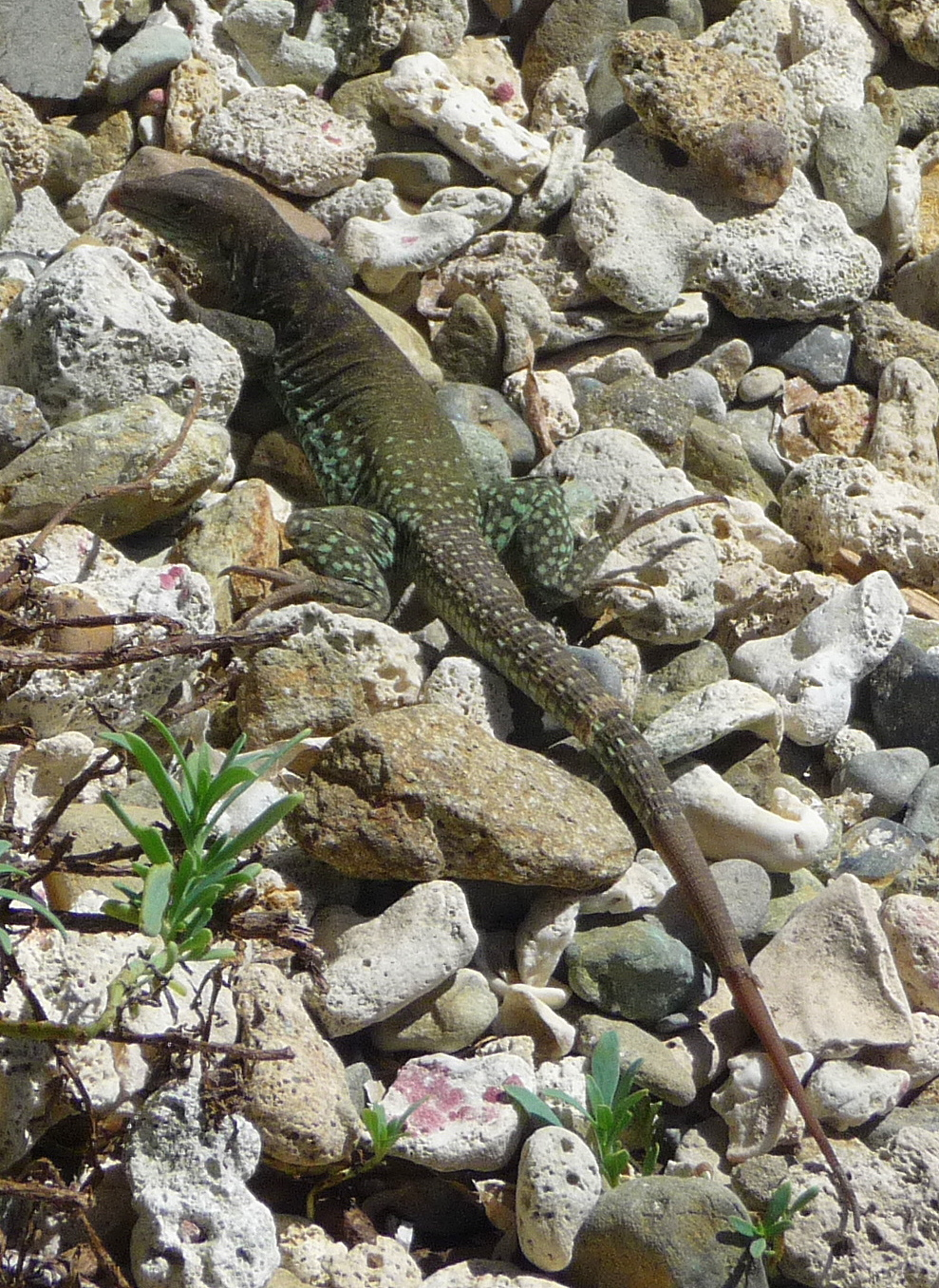
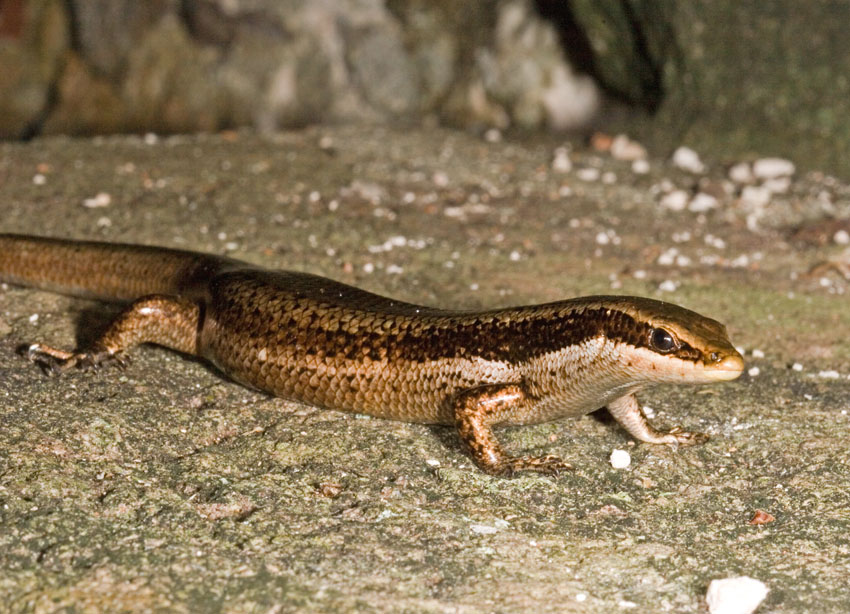
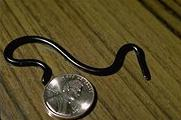
Geckos (Gekkonidae)
Species	Common name(s)	Notes	Image
Hemidactylus mabouia	House gecko	Introduced.
Sphaerodactylus parvus		Regionally endemic. Highly abundant. Formerly described as subspecies of Sphaerodactylus macrolepis chiefly found in the Greater Antilles until elevated to species level in 2001.
Sphaerodactylus sputator	Island least gecko	Regional endemic. Highly abundant.
Thecadactylus rapicauda	Turnip-tailed gecko
Iguanas and anolids (Iguanidae)
Species	Common name(s)	Notes	Image
Anolis carolinensis	Green anole, Carolina anole, red-throated anole, American anole, American chameleon	Recent introduction; native mainly to southeastern United States.
Anolis gingivinus	Anguilla anole, Anguilla Bank anole	Regional endemic. Widespread and common on the main island and its satellites.
Iguana delicatissima	Lesser Antillean iguana, West Indian iguana	Vulnerable. Regional endemic. Restricted to the Little Bay area. Only about 50 individuals were believed to remain on Anguilla in 1999.
Iguana iguana	Green iguana, common iguana	Colonized Anguilla due to either Hurricane Luis or Marilyn in 1995, by floating on natural rafts from Guadeloupe; has apparently since sustained a breeding population on Anguilla, possibly threatening the native I. delicatissima.
Whiptails (Teiidae)
Species	Common name(s)	Notes	Image
Pholidoscelis corax	Censky's ameiva	Endemic. Restricted to the tiny islet of Little Scrub, off the coast of Scrub Island.
Pholidoscelis corvina	Sombrero ameiva	Endemic. Restricted to Sombrero Island.
Pholidoscelis plei	Anguilla Bank ameiva	Regional endemic. Common; found on the main island of Anguilla and most of its satellites.
Skinks (Scincidae)
Species	Common name(s)	Notes	Image
Mabuya mabouya		Regional endemic.
Worm snakes (Typhlopidae)
Species	Common name(s)	Notes	Image
Ramphotyphlops braminus	Brahminy blind snake, flowerpot blind snake	Presence on Anguilla recently discovered. Widely distributed in the tropics, but limited in the Lesser Antilles.
Colubrids (Colubridae)
Species	Common name(s)	Notes	Image
Alsophis rijgersmaei	Leeward Island racer	Endangered. Regional endemic. Found on main island and Scrub Island.
