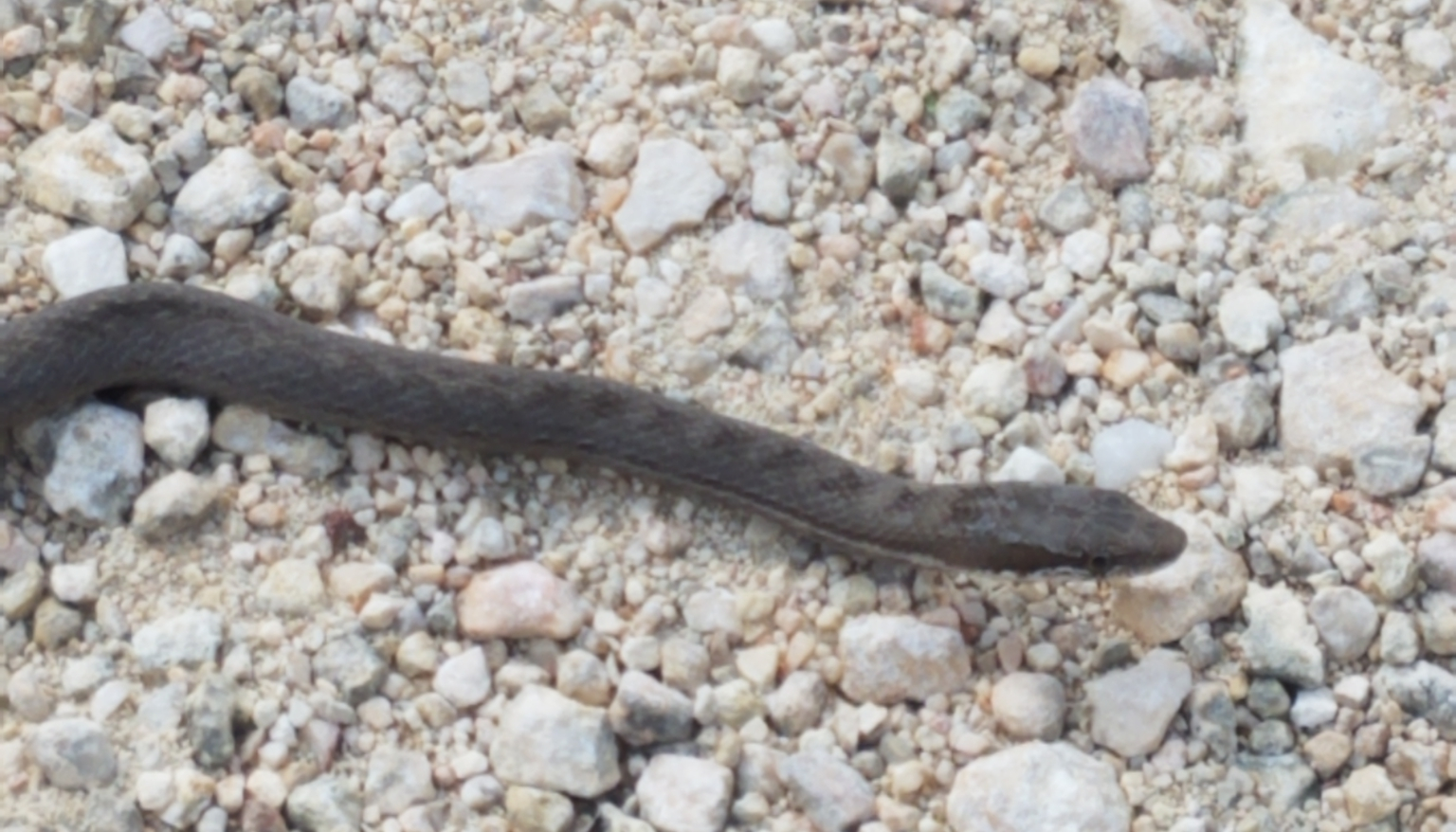

Conservation status
- Endangered (IUCN 3.1)

Scientific classification
- Kingdom: Animalia
- Phylum: Chordata
- Class: Reptilia
- Order: Squamata
- Suborder: Serpentes
- Family: Colubridae
- Genus: Alsophis
- Species: A. rijgersmaei

Binomial name
- Alsophis rijgersmaei Cope, 1869

Synonyms
- Alsophis cinereus Garman, 1887; Dromicus rufiventris Boulenger, 1894; Alsophis rijersmaei Barbour, 1914; Leimadophis rufiventris Amaral, 1929; Dromicus cinereus Werner, 1929; Dromicus rijgersmaei Werner, 1929; Alsophis rigersmaei Barbour, 1930; Alsophis rijgersmai Parker, 1936

= Leeward Island racer =

Species of snake

The Leeward Island racer (Alsophis rijgersmaei), also known as the Anguilla Bank racer, is a species of snake in the family Colubridae. The species is known to inhabit Anguilla, Scrub Island, Saint Barthélemy, Île Bonhomme and Île Tortue, with it being unknown whether or not the species is still extant on Saint Martin.

== Taxonomy ==
The species was named by Edward Drinker Cope in 1869, the specific name honouring the amateur naturalist and Dutch government physician in Sint Maarten, Hendrik Elingsz van Rijgersma.

== Distribution and habitat ==
The racers are known to inhabit Anguilla, Scrub Island, Saint Barthélemy, Île Bonhomme and Île Tortue, and was last seen in 1996 on Saint Martin, from which it may since have been extirpated. There have also been unconfirmed reports of the racer being present on Île Fourchue. The racer's habitat primarily consists of areas with mostly xerophytic plants. It can be found in areas ranging from sea level to the 286-metre (938 ft) peak of Morne de Vitet, Saint Barthélemy.

== Description ==
The Leeward Island racer is a slender and fast-moving species of snake. Its body is wider than its head, and its "muzzle is rather pointed". The racers usually have around 200 ventral scales and 100 sub-caudal scales, with females generally having more than males, and 21 dorsal scales at the midbody. It's colouration varies from being light grey to dark brown approaching black. Freshly hatched racers on average weigh 3.9 grams (0.14 oz) and are 23.7 centimetres (9.3 in) long, and adults can reach up to lengths of 108 cm (43 in) from snout to vent, and 138 cm (54 in) from snout to tail.

== Behaviour ==
Racers spend most of their time on the ground, concealed by the underbrush, but they can and do also spend time in trees, bushes and on rock faces. They are primarily diurnal.

Racer's diets consist primarily of lizards of the genus Anolis, a common prey for snakes in the Leeward Islands, supplemented by bird chicks, rodents and amphibians, including the Cuban tree frog on Anguilla, where the frog is an introduced species. There has also been one observed case of cannibalism. The racer varies the method it uses to hunt depending on the size of its prey, with smaller creatures being immediately ingested while larger creatures are first killed by venom or constriction. Animals that predate on the racers include American kestrels, great egrets and mongooses, the latter of which has been a significant threat to the other Alsophis species of the Lesser Antilles.

== Sources ==
- Henderson, Robert W. (2004). "Lesser Antillean snake faunas: distribution, ecology, and conservation concerns". Oryx. 38 (3): 311–320. doi:10.1017/S0030605304000559. ISSN 0030-6053.
- Questel, Karl (January 2021). Alsophis rijgersmaei Cope, 1869 (Squamata: Dipsadidae) sur l’île de Saint-Barthélemy [Alsophis rijgersmaei Cope, 1869 (Squamata: Dipsadidae) on the island of Saint Barthélemy.] (PDF) (Report). Agence Territoriale de l’Environnement St. Barthélemy. Archived (PDF) from the original on 2026-05-09 – via ResearchGate.
- Brongersma, Leo Daniël (1959). "Some Snakes from the Lesser Antilles" (PDF). Studies on the Fauna of Curaçao and other Caribbean Islands. 9 (1): 50–60 – via Naturalis.
- Powell, Robert (2006). "Conservation of the herpetofauna on the Dutch Windward Islands: St. Eustatius, Saba, and St. Maarten" (PDF). Applied Herpetology. 3 (4): 293–306 – via ResearchGate.
- Sajdak, Richard A.; Henderson, Robert W. (1991). "Status of West Indian racers in the Lesser Antilles". Oryx. 25 (1): 33–38. doi:10.1017/S0030605300034049. ISSN 0030-6053.
