= La Tortue, Saint Barthélemy =

Small island in the French Caribbean

La Tortue
- Map of Saint Barthélemy and islands.

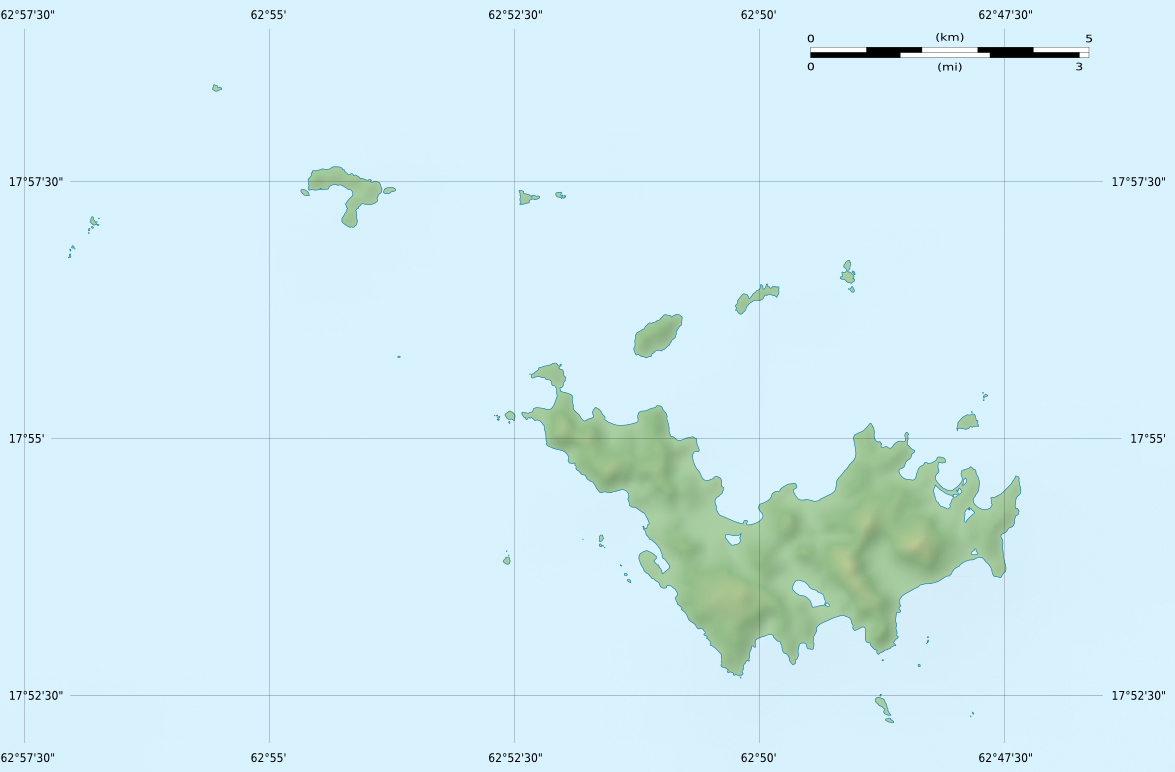
- Location within Saint Barthélemy Location within Lesser Antilles Location within the Caribbean

Geography
- Location: Caribbean
- Coordinates: 17°55′11″N 62°47′53″W
- Archipelago: Leeward Islands, Lesser Antilles
- Adjacent to: Saint Barthélemy Channel
- Area: 7 ha (17 acres)
- Highest elevation: 35 m (115 ft)

Administration
- France; Saint Barthélemy

Demographics
- Population: Uninhabited

Additional information
- Time zone: AST (UTC-4)
- Réserve Naturelle de Saint-Barthélemy
- IUCN category II (national park)
- Location: Saint Barthélemy
- Area: 1,200 ha (3,000 acres)
- Established: 1996
- Governing body: Grenat Association
- Website: reservenaturellestbarth.com/en

La Tortue ou l'Ecalle, Île Tortue or Turtle Island is a small rocky islet off the north-eastern coast of Saint Barthélemy in the Caribbean. Its highest point is 35 metres (115 ft) above sea level. Referencing tortoises, it forms part of the Réserve naturelle nationale de Saint-Barthélemy with several of the other northern islets of St Barts.

== History and description ==
La Tortue is a small rocky islet off the coast of the French overseas collectivity of Saint Barthélemy in the Leeward Islands of the Caribbean. La Tortue is to the north of Anse du Grand Cul-de-Sac, a bay and quartier on the east of Saint Barthélemy. The island has an area of 35 hectares and has a highest point 35 metres (115 ft) above sea level. It is privately owned by Henri Gréaux and has no permanent human settlements. The entirety of the island is a protected area, administered as part of the Nature Reserve of Saint Barthélemy - Nicole Aussedat. The process of making the island a protected area began in 1988 with the formation of the Association de Protection de la Nature de Saint-Barthélemy. In 1995, the town council approved the creation of a reserve. A National Nature Reserve on Saint Barthélemy, including La Tortue, was finally created by the French Legislature in 1996. Within the reserve, La Tortue is part of an enhanced protection zone, where there is a complete ban on collecting biota, dumping garbage, touching protected marine species, fishing, anchoring, scuba diving, and the use of certain boats.

The vegetation on the island consists mostly of scrub. Although the island's difficult environment means the trees rarely reach more than 3 metres (10 ft) in height, it is still one of the best vegetated islets near Saint Barthélemy and acts as habitat for several endangered species. There are many meadows of species including Ipomoea, Chloris, Sporobolus, and Crotalaria, punctuated by thickets of shrubs in aeolian processes. The sparse tree cover consists of Tabebuia lepidota, Plumeria alba, Jacquinia armillaris, and Cordia dentata and the cacti Melocactus intortus and Pilosocereus royenii are also present.

== Fauna ==
The island has been recognised as an Important Bird Area (IBA) by BirdLife International because it supports breeding colonies of royal terns and laughing gulls, as well as a few pairs of red-billed tropicbirds. There are around 150 breeding pairs of laughing gulls and 50 breeding pairs of royal terns on the island.
