= Outline of Saint Barthélemy =

Overview of and topical guide

The Flag of Saint Barthelemy

The Coat of arms of Saint Barthelemy

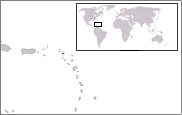
The location of Saint Barthélemy

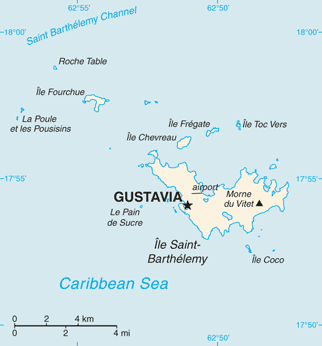
An enlargeable map of the French Overseas Collectivity of Saint Barthélemy

The following outline is provided as an overview of and topical guide to Saint Barthelemy:

The Collectivity of Saint Barthélemy is an overseas collectivity of France located in the Leeward Islands in the Caribbean Sea. Also known as Saint Barth in French, or St. Barts in English, the collectivity is one of the four French territories in the Leeward Islands that comprise the French West Indies, and it is the only one to have historically been a Swedish colony.

== General reference ==
- Pronunciation:
- Common English country names: Saint Barthélemy, Saint Barth, or Saint Barts
- Official English country name: The French Overseas Collectivity of Saint Barthélemy
- Common endonym(s):
- Official endonym(s):
- Adjectival(s): Barthélemoise
- Demonym(s): Barthélemoise
- Etymology: Name of Saint Barthélemy
- ISO country codes: BL, BLM, 652
- ISO region codes: See ISO 3166-2:BL
- Internet country code top-level domain: .bl

== Geography of Saint Barthelemy ==
- Saint Barthelemy is: an island, and an overseas collectivity of France
- Location:
  - Northern Hemisphere and Western Hemisphere
    - North America (though not on the mainland)
  - Atlantic Ocean
    - North Atlantic
      - Caribbean (West Indies)
        - Antilles
          - Lesser Antilles
            - Leeward Islands
              - French West Indies
  - Time zone: Eastern Caribbean Time (UTC-04)
  - Extreme points of Saint Barthelemy
    - High: Morne du Vitet 286 m (938 ft)
    - Low: Caribbean Sea 0 m
  - Land boundaries: none
  - Coastline: Caribbean Sea
- Population of Saint Barthélemy:
- Area of Saint Barthélemy: 21 km^{2}
- Atlas of Saint Barthelemy

=== Environment of Saint Barthelemy ===
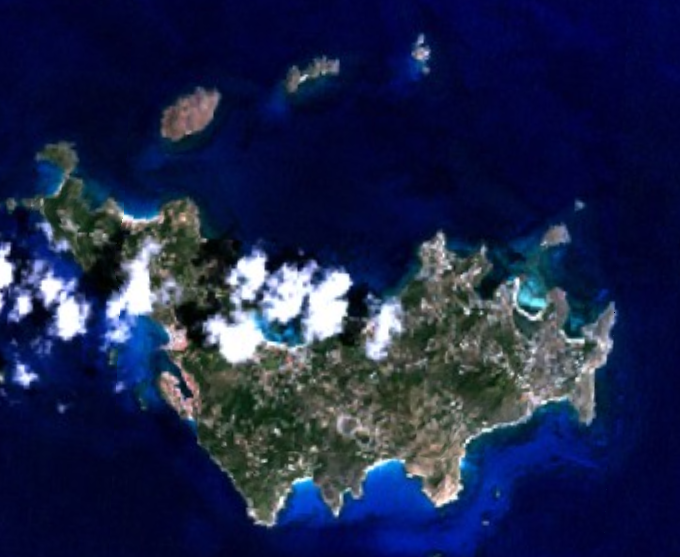
An enlargeable satellite image of Saint Barthélemy

- Climate of Saint Barthélemy
- Renewable energy in Saint Barthelemy
- Geology of Saint Barthelemy
- Protected areas of Saint Barthelemy
  - Biosphere reserves in Saint Barthelemy
  - National parks of Saint Barthelemy
- Wildlife of Saint Barthelemy
  - Fauna of Saint Barthelemy
    - Birds of Saint Barthelemy
    - Mammals of Saint Barthelemy

==== Natural geographic features of Saint Barthelemy ====
- Fjords of Saint Barthelemy
- Glaciers of Saint Barthelemy
- Islands of Saint Barthelemy
- Lakes of Saint Barthelemy
- Mountains of Saint Barthelemy
  - Volcanoes in Saint Barthelemy
- Rivers of Saint Barthelemy
  - Waterfalls of Saint Barthelemy
- Valleys of Saint Barthelemy
- World Heritage Sites in Saint Barthelemy: None

=== Regions of Saint Barthelemy ===
Regions of Saint Barthelemy

==== Ecoregions of Saint Barthelemy ====
List of ecoregions in Saint Barthelemy

- Ecoregions in Saint Barthelemy

== Government and politics of Saint Barthelemy ==
Politics of Saint Barthelemy

- Form of government:
- Capital of Saint Barthelemy: Gustavia
- Elections in Saint Barthelemy
- Political parties in Saint Barthelemy

=== Branches of the government of Saint Barthelemy ===
Government of Saint Barthelemy

==== Executive branch of the government of Saint Barthelemy ====
- Head of state: President of Saint Barthelemy,
- Head of government: Prime Minister of Saint Barthelemy,
- Cabinet of Saint Barthelemy

==== Legislative branch of the government of Saint Barthelemy ====
- Parliament of Saint Barthelemy (bicameral)
  - Upper house: Senate of Saint Barthelemy
  - Lower house: House of Commons of Saint Barthelemy

==== Judicial branch of the government of Saint Barthelemy ====
Court system of Saint Barthelemy

- Supreme Court of Saint Barthelemy

=== Foreign relations of Saint Barthelemy ===
Foreign relations of Saint Barthelemy

- Diplomatic missions in Saint Barthelemy
- Diplomatic missions of Saint Barthelemy
- France-Saint Barthelemy relations

==== International organization membership ====
The Collectivity of Saint Barthélemy is a member of:

- Universal Postal Union (UPU)
- World Federation of Trade Unions (WFTU)

=== Law and order in Saint Barthelemy ===
Law of Saint Barthelemy

- Constitution of Saint Barthelemy
- Crime in Saint Barthelemy
- Human rights in Saint Barthelemy
  - LGBT rights in Saint Barthelemy
  - Freedom of religion in Saint Barthelemy
- Law enforcement in Saint Barthelemy

=== Military of Saint Barthelemy ===
Military of Saint Barthelemy

- Command
  - Commander-in-chief:
    - Ministry of Defence of Saint Barthelemy
- Forces
  - Army of Saint Barthelemy
  - Navy of Saint Barthelemy
  - Air Force of Saint Barthelemy
  - Special forces of Saint Barthelemy
- Military history of Saint Barthelemy
- Military ranks of Saint Barthelemy

=== Local government in Saint Barthelemy ===
Local government in Saint Barthelemy

== History of Saint Barthelemy ==
- Military history of Saint Barthelemy

== Culture of Saint Barthelemy ==
Culture of Saint Barthelemy

- Architecture of Saint Barthelemy
- Cuisine of Saint Barthélemy
- Festivals in Saint Barthelemy
- Languages of Saint Barthélemy
- Media in Saint Barthelemy
- National symbols of Sainté Barthelemy
  - Coat of arms of Saint Barthelemy
  - Flag of Saint Barthelemy
  - National anthem of Saint Barthélemy
- People of Saint Barthelemy
- Public holidays in Saint Barthelemy
- Records of Saint Barthelemy
- Religion in Saint Barthelemy
  - Christianity in Saint Barthelemy
  - Hinduism in Saint Barthélemy
  - Islam in Saint Barthelemy
  - Judaism in Saint Barthelemy
  - Sikhism in Saint Barthelemy
- World Heritage Sites in Saint Barthelemy: None

=== Art in Saint Barthelemy ===
- Art in Saint Barthelemy
- Cinema of Saint Barthelemy
- Literature of Saint Barthelemy
- Music of Saint Barthelemy
- Television in Saint Barthélemy
- Theatre in Saint Barthelemy

=== Sports in Saint Barthelemy ===
Sports in Saint Barthelemy

- Football in Saint Barthélemy
- Saint Barthelemy at the Olympics

== Economy and infrastructure of Saint Barthelemy ==
- Economic rank, by nominal GDP (2007):
- Agriculture in Saint Barthelemy
- Banking in Saint Barthelemy
  - National Bank of Saint Barthelemy
- Communications in Saint Barthelemy
  - Internet in Saint Barthelemy
- Companies of Saint Barthelemy
- Currency of Saint Barthélemy: Euro (see also: Euro topics)
  - ISO 4217: EUR
- Energy in Saint Barthelemy
  - Energy policy of Saint Barthelemy
  - Oil industry in Saint Barthelemy
- Mining in Saint Barthelemy
- Tourism in Saint Barthélemy
- Transport in Saint Barthélemy
- Saint Barthelemy Stock Exchange

== Education in Saint Barthelemy ==
Education in Saint Barthelemy

== Infrastructure of Saint Barthelemy ==
- Health care in Saint Barthelemy
- Transportation in Saint Barthélemy
  - Airports in Saint Barthelemy
  - Rail transport in Saint Barthelemy
  - Roads in Saint Barthelemy
- Water supply and sanitation in Saint Barthelemy

== See also ==
- Index of Saint Barthélemy-See also
- List of international rankings
- List of Saint Barthélemy-related topics
- Outline of France
- Outline of geography
- Outline of North America
- Outline of the Caribbean

== Bibliography ==
- Mémoire St Barth : Comprehensive bibliography about the island
