= Île Chevreau =

French Caribbean island north of Saint-Barthélemy

Île Bonhomme
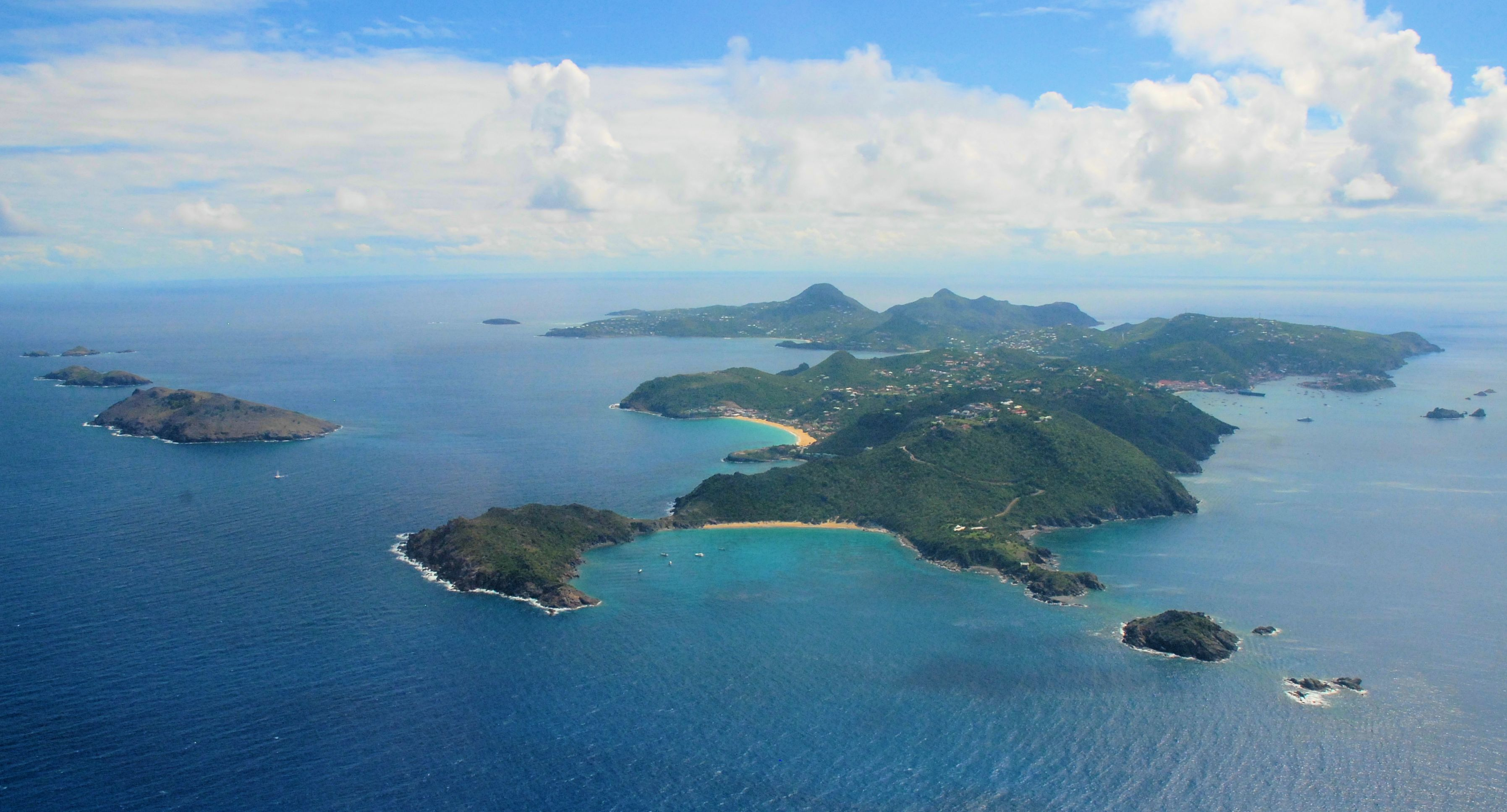
- Île Chevreau, first island on the left.

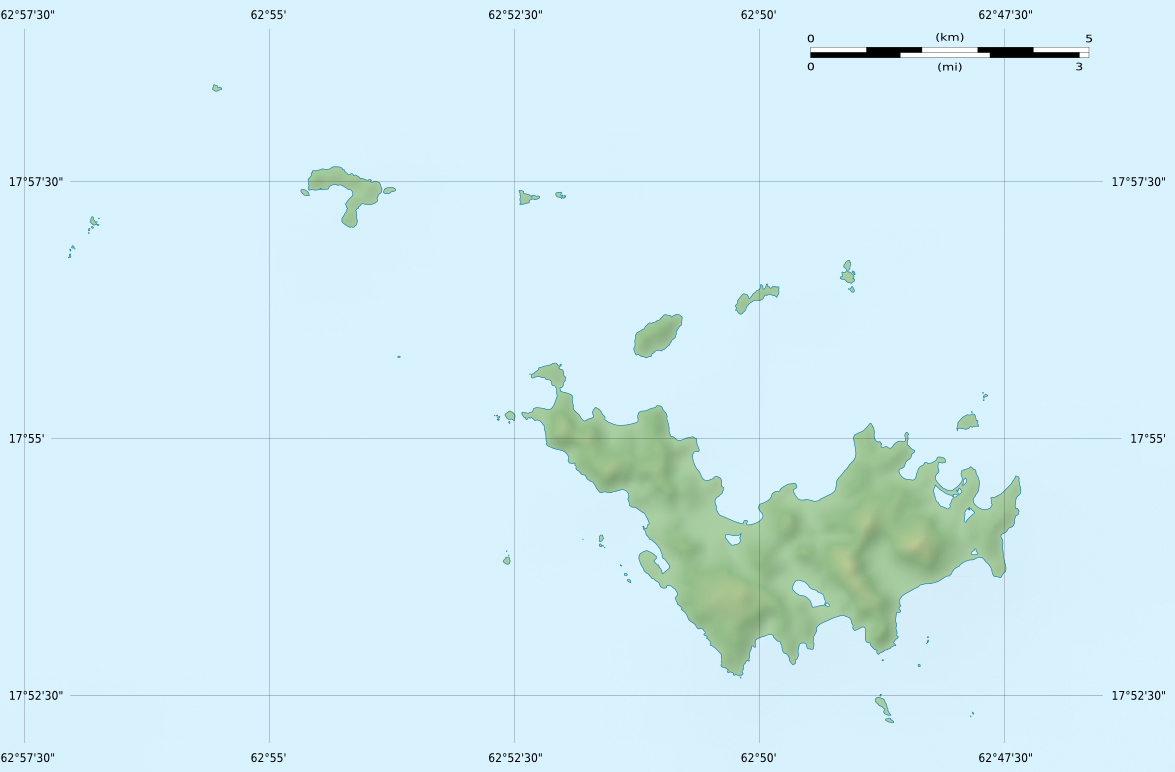
- Location within Saint Barthélemy Location within Lesser Antilles

Geography
- Location: Caribbean
- Coordinates: 17°56′3″N 62°51′5″W
- Archipelago: Leeward Islands, Lesser Antilles
- Highest elevation: 105 m (344 ft)

Administration
- France

Demographics
- Population: 0

Additional information
- Time zone: AST (UTC-4)

Île Chevreau, also known as Île Bonhomme, is an uninhabited island off the north coast of Saint Barthélemy in the Caribbean. It is a part of the French Antilles, and the westernmost of a series of islands north of Saint Barthélemy. The island is inhabited by a variety of reptiles.

== Geography ==
The island is the westernmost of a series of minor islands that lie north of Saint Barthélemy, the others being Île Frégate and the three islands of Île Toc Vers. The island lies around 1 kilometre (3,300 ft) to the west of Île Frégate, 900 metres (3,000 ft) to the north of Pointe d'Étages on Saint Barthélemy. The highest point of the island has an elevation of 105 metres (344 ft), and is located slightly to the east of the island's centre.

== Political status ==
The island has been a part of the French overseas collectivity of Saint Barthélemy since 22 February 2007, when Saint Barthélemy seceded from the French overseas was a part of the French overseas department of Guadeloupe. It continued being an outermost region of the European Union until 1 January 2012, when Saint Barthélemy's became an overseas territory of the European Union. Unlike Colombier Bay to the west and Île Frégate and Île Toc Vers to the east, Île Chevreau is not a part of the Nature Reserve of Saint Barthélemy.

== Ecology ==
Reptiles found on the island include the Anguilla Bank racer, the Anguilla Bank ameiva, the Anguilla Bank tree anole and the Lesser Antillean iguana.

A 2026 paper by Julio A. Genero describing a new species of bee, Megachile karlquesteli, reports that Île Chevreau is one of the islands inhabited by it.
