= Hendrik van Rijgersma =

Dutch painter

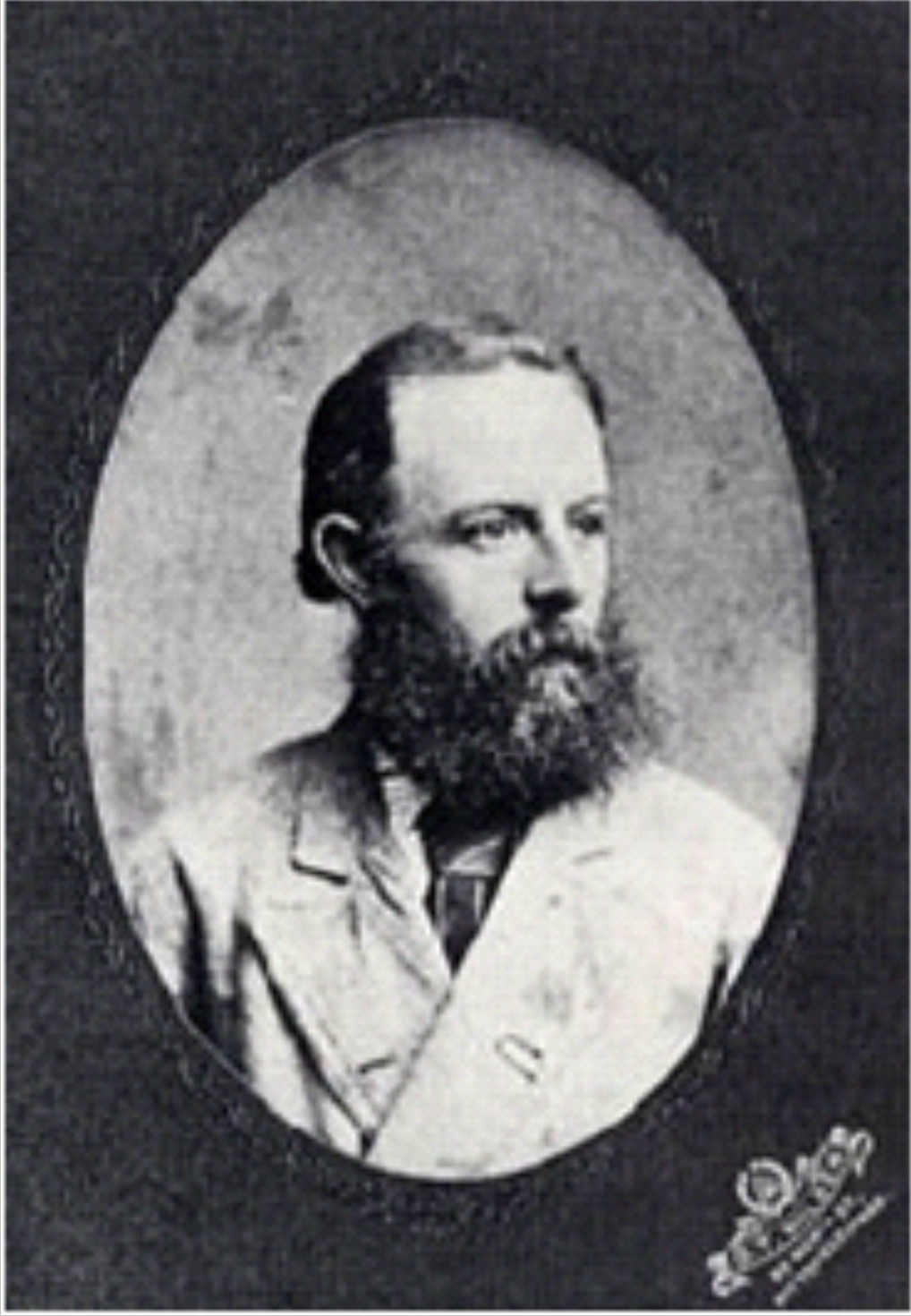
Hendrik van Rijgersma (1835–1877)

Hendrik Elingsz van Rijgersma (born 5 January 1835 in Lemmer, Province of Friesland, the Netherlands, died 4 March 1877 in St. Martin) was a Dutch naturalist, medical doctor, amateur botanist, malacologist and ichthyologist.

== Biography ==
Rijgersma became a physician in 1858, and practiced medicine in the small town of Jisp and on the island of Marken. In 1861, he married Maria Henriette Gräfing; they had seven children.

When slavery was abolished in the Dutch colonies in 1863, he was one of six physicians appointed to provide medical care to the liberated slaves on the island of St. Martin in the Netherlands Antilles, where he served as government physician until his untimely death at the age of 42. There he collected many fossils, plants, birds, reptiles, fishes, mollusks, crustaceans and insects.

Hendrik van Rijgersma was also a painter. He left to posterity many, mostly unpublished, drawings, sketches and water colors of plants, shells and other subjects.

His animal collections were sent by him to the Academy of Natural Sciences of Philadelphia, of which he was a corresponding member. The plants he sent to the Berlin herbarium were destroyed. There apparently are also plants he collected at the National Herbarium of the Netherlands at Leyden. In the Swedish Museum of Natural History, there are 129 plants collected by van Rijgersma, of which 74 have illustrations.

A species of snake, Alsophis rijgersmaei, is named in his honor.

== Works by and about Rijgersma ==
- WorldCat

== Sources ==
- Biography by Mia Ehn, Swedish Museum of Natural History
- Ehn, Mia & Zanoni, T. A. The herbarium and botanical art of Hendrik Elingsz van Rijgersma, Taxon 51: 513–520, 2002.
