= Île Frégate =

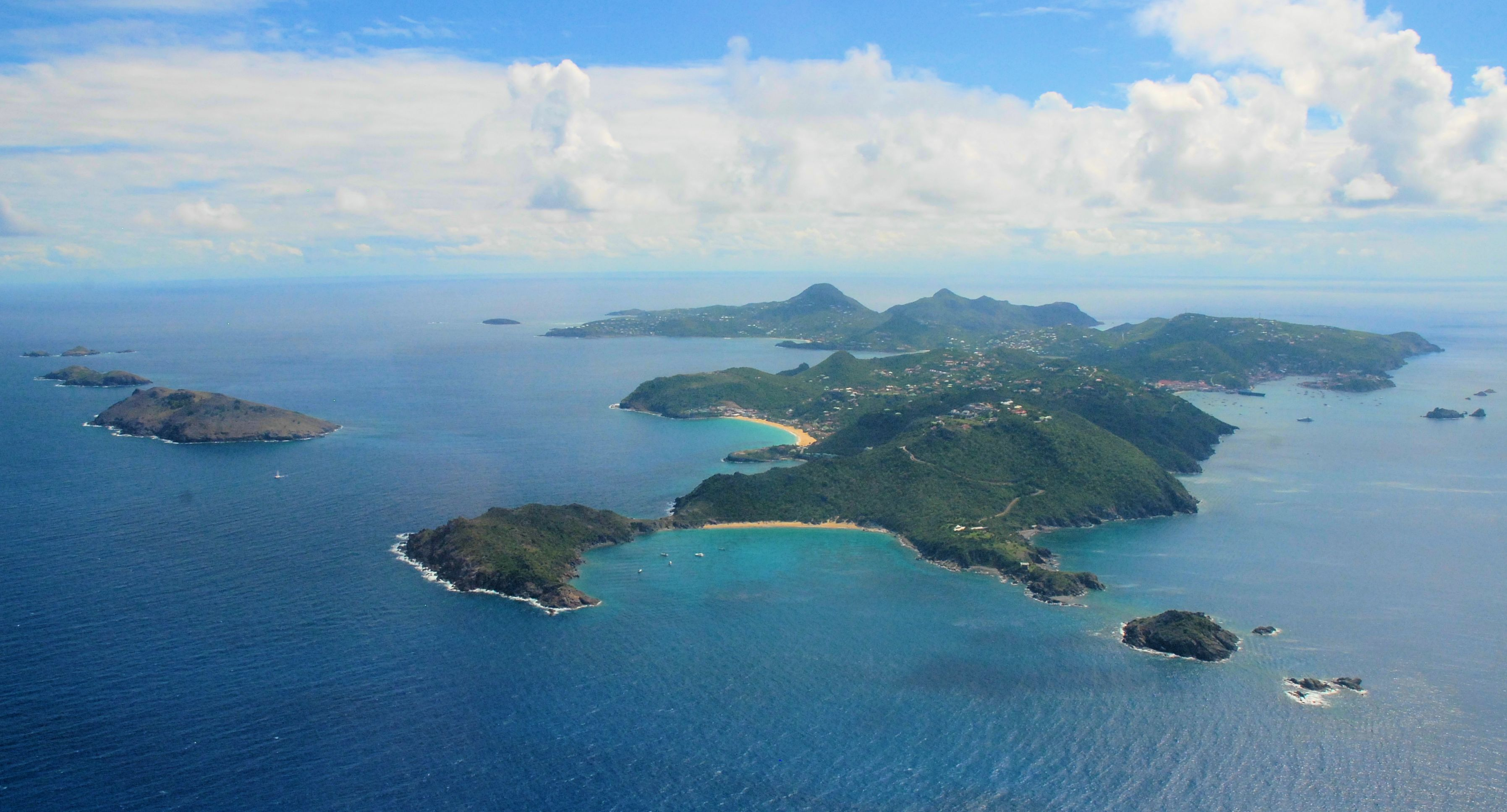
- Île Frégate, second island on the left in distance

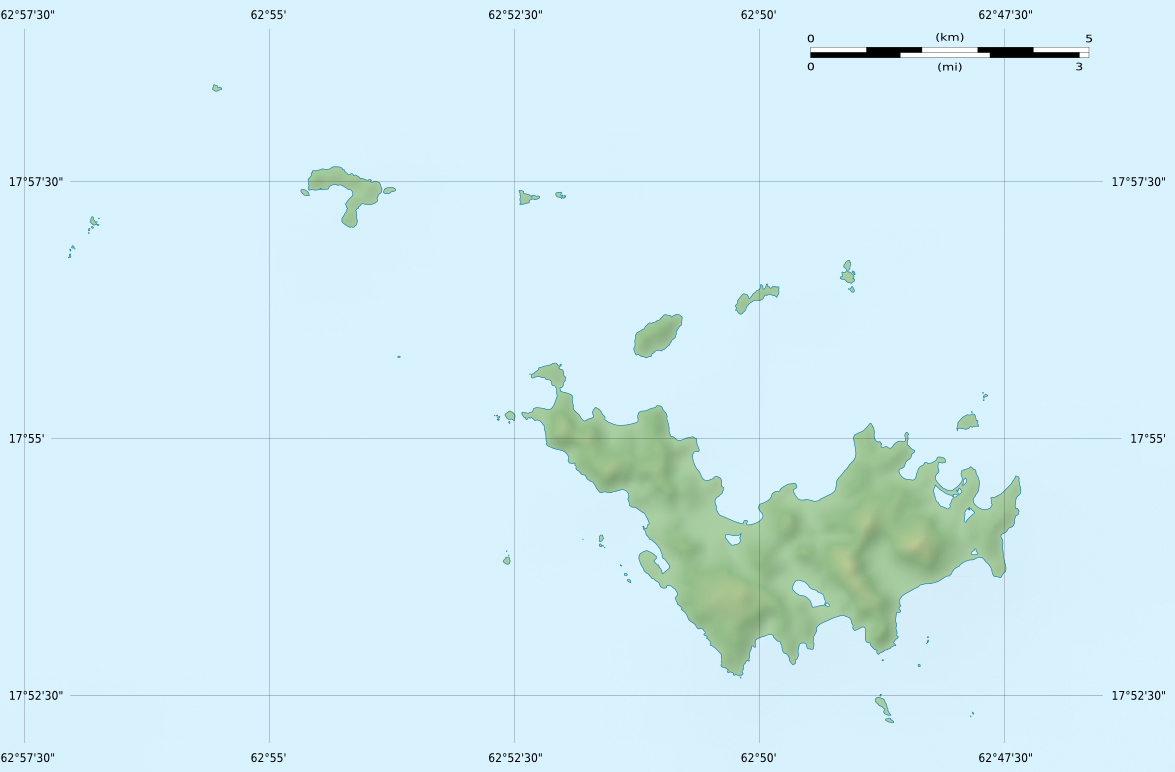
- Location within Saint Barthélemy Location within Lesser Antilles Location within the Caribbean

Geography
- Location: Caribbean
- Coordinates: 17°56′23″N 62°50′3″W
- Archipelago: Leeward Islands, Lesser Antilles
- Area: 0.29 km^{2} (0.11 sq mi)

Administration
- France

Additional information
- Time zone: AST (UTC-4)
- Réserve Naturelle de Saint-Barthélemy
- IUCN category II (national park)
- Location: Saint Barthélemy
- Area: 1,200 ha (3,000 acres)
- Established: 1996
- Governing body: Grenat Association
- Website: reservenaturellestbarth.com/en

Île Frégate is a small, uninhabited island in the Caribbean Sea located off the north coast of Saint Barthélemy, an overseas collectivity of France. Île Frégate is situated within the Nature Reserve of Saint Bartholomew, which was established in 1996 with the objective of conserving coral reefs, sea grass beds and marine life.

== Geography ==
Île Frégate is an uninhabited cay in the Caribbean. Situated north of Saint Barthélemy, it is one of its satellite islands. Due to its shape, Île Frégate has been described as "twin islets". It is the second northeasternmost of a series of islands, and lies between Île Chevreau and Île Toc Vers. Île Fregate is located 0.7 miles (1.1 km) to the west of Île Toc Vers, a "pointed islet". According to sailing information, traversing through the channel between the two islets should be avoided. Île Frégate is situated within the Réserve naturelle nationale de Saint-Barthélemy, which also includes Gros Îlets and Pain de Sucre; the waters surrounding the islets Fourchue, and Île Toc Vers; and part of Colombier bay. Situated on the windward side of the marine reserve, it is noted for sea life which can be viewed while snorkeling.

== Flora and fauna ==
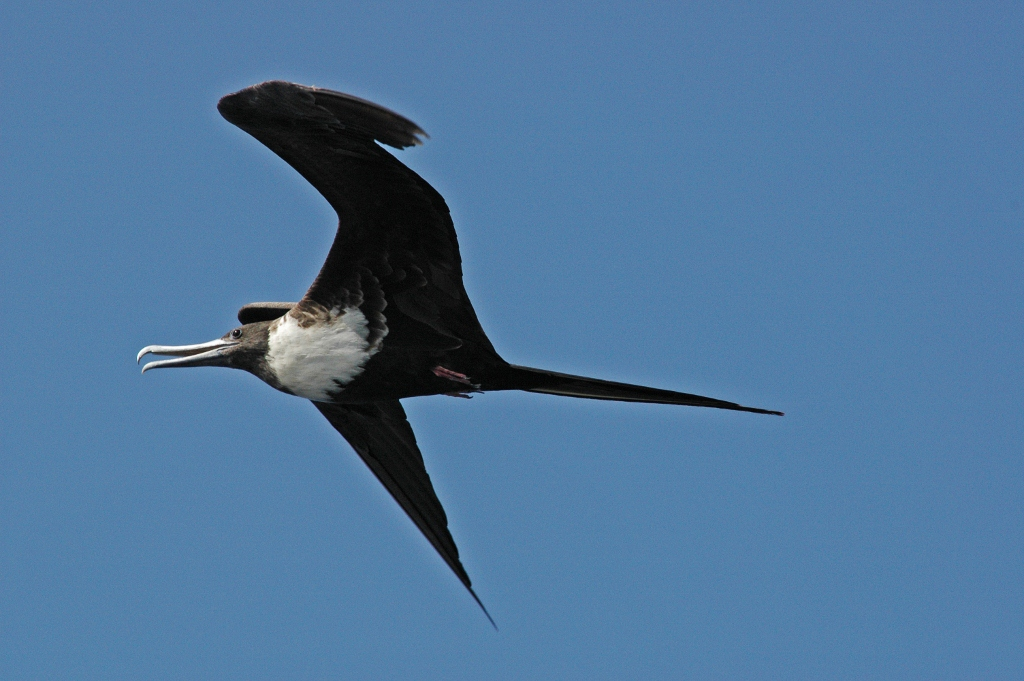
A Magnificent Frigatebird (Fregata magnificens) in flight in the Caribbean

The high islet features grass and bush flora. Its protected area measures 1,200 hectares (3,000 acres). Bird life on the island has included a frigatebird colony, although this has been significantly diminished due to the removal of bird eggs. According to the International Union for Conservation of Nature, Iguana delicatissima or Lesser Antillean Green Iguana, and West Indian Iguana have been found on Île Frégate. Sphaerodactylus sputator (Leeward Banded Sphaero) was recorded on the island in 2012.

== Bibliography ==
- Gravette, Andrew Gerald (1990). The French Antilles. Hippocrene Books. ISBN 978-0-87052-737-1.
- Greenberg, Harriet (1 April 2003). St. Martin and St. Barts Alive!. Hunter Publishing, Inc. ISBN 978-1-58843-356-5.
- Jaffray, Roger (17 November 2012). Le transport maritime à Saint-Barthélemy et Saint-Martin depuis 1930. SCITEP éditions. ISBN 978-2-9540280-1-9.
- Malhotra, Anita; Thorpe, Roger S. (1999). Reptiles and Amphibians of the Eastern Caribbean. London: Caribbean. ISBN 978-0-333-69141-0.
- Nash, K.C. (15 April 2011). St Barts Travel Adventures. Hunter Publishing, Inc. ISBN 978-1-58843-704-4.
- The New Yorker (October 1987). The New Yorker. 33–38. Vol. 63.
- ProStar (1 January 2004). ProStar Sailing Directions 2004 Caribbean. Vol. 1 Enroute. ProStar Publications. ISBN 978-1-57785-567-5.
- Wells, Sue (1988). Coral Reefs of the World: Atlantic and eastern Pacific. UNEP. ISBN 978-2-88032-943-3.
