= Anse du Grand Cul-de-Sac =

- Quartier
- The quartier of Anse du Grand Cul-de-Sac marked 39.
- Coordinates: 17°54′33″N 62°47′55″W
- Country: France
- Overseas collectivity: Saint Barthélemy

Anse du Grand Cul-de-Sac (pronounced [ɑ̃s dy ɡʁɑ̃ ky də sak]) is a quartier of Saint Barthélemy in the Caribbean. It is located in the northeastern part of the island.
