= Île Toc Vers =

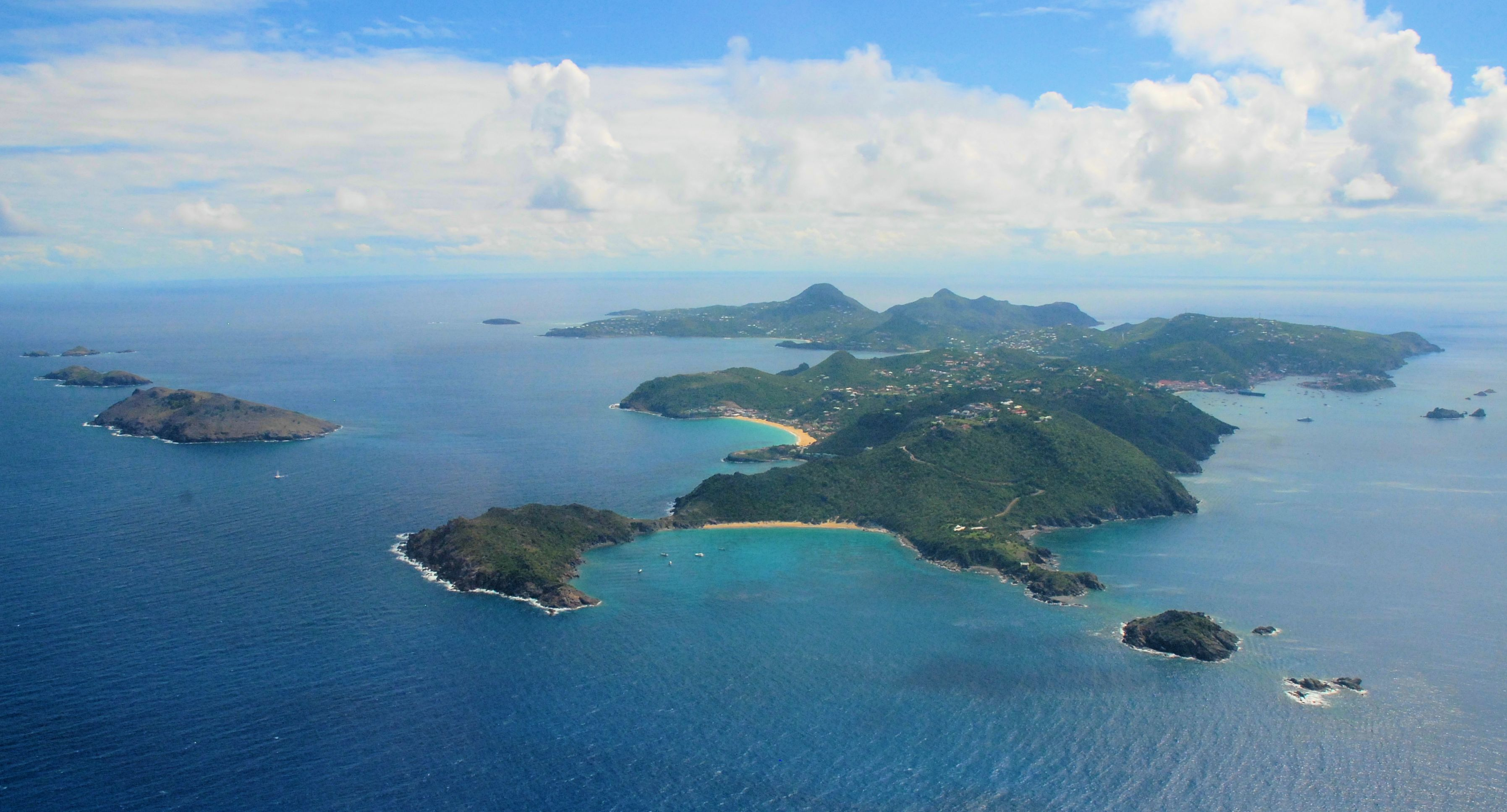
- Île Toc Vers, third island group on left, furthest away in the distance.

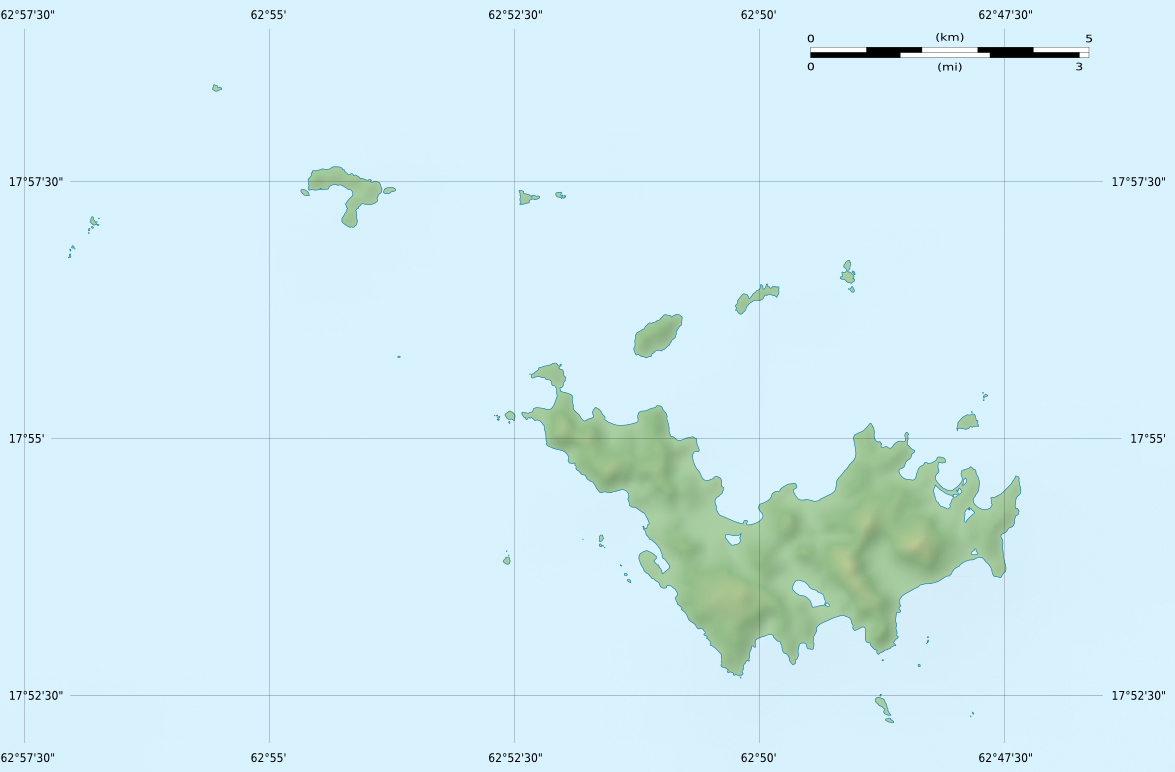
- Location within Saint Barthélemy Location within Lesser Antilles Location within the Caribbean

Geography
- Location: Caribbean
- Coordinates: 17°56′35″N 62°49′0″W
- Archipelago: Leeward Islands, Lesser Antilles
- Adjacent to: Saint Barthélemy Channel
- Total islands: 3

Administration
- France; Saint Barthélemy

Additional information
- Time zone: AST (UTC-4)
- Réserve Naturelle de Saint-Barthélemy
- IUCN category II (national park)
- Location: Saint Barthélemy
- Area: 1,200 ha (3,000 acres)
- Established: 1996
- Governing body: Grenat Association
- Website: reservenaturellestbarth.com/en

Île Toc Vers is a small island group off the north coast of Saint Barthélemy in the Caribbean. They are the northeasternmost of a series of islands which include Île Chevreau and Île Frégate. The Île Toc Vers group consists of three small rocky islands, aligned in a north–south fashion, between 15 and 43 metres in height. The largest island of the group is in the middle. It is situated within Réserve naturelle nationale de Saint-Barthélemy.
