= Flag and coat of arms of Saint Barthélemy =

Saint Barthélemy
- Flag of France; Saint Barthélemy is an overseas collectivity of France
- Tricolore
- Use: National flag, civil and state ensign
- Proportion: 2:3
- Adopted: 15 February 1794; 232 years ago
- Unofficial flag of Saint Barthelemy
- Use: Other

An unofficial flag of Saint Barthélemy consisting of the coat of arms of Saint Barthélemy centered on a white field is used on the island. Officially, only the flag of France, of which Saint Barthélemy is a self-governing overseas collectivity, is flown in the territory.

== Coat of arms ==
Coat of arms of Saint Barthélemy.

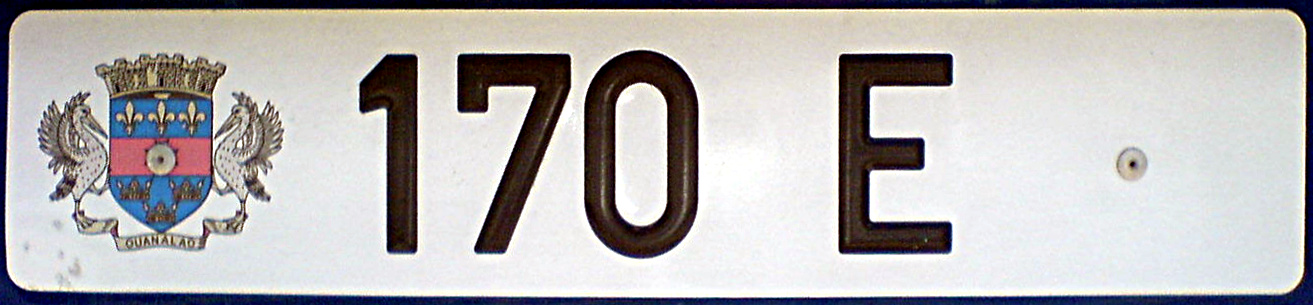
Coat of arms of Saint Barthélemy on a vehicle registration plate.

The coat of arms of Saint-Barthélemy is a shield divided into three horizontal stripes (parted per fess), three gold fleurs-de-lis on blue, above a white Maltese cross on red, over three gold crowns on blue, and "Ouanalao" is what the indigenous people called the island. On top of the shield is a mural crown. The fleurs-de-lis, Maltese Cross, and gold crowns are heraldic reminders of the island's history as a colony ruled by first the Kingdom of France, then the Knights Hospitaller and in turn the Kingdom of Sweden. Eventually, the island returned to French rule. On a white background, the arms serves as an unofficial flag for Saint Barthélemy.

In 1977, the Director General of the French National Archives decreed that every French municipality and territory was to adopt "a unique urban symbol". Saint Barthélemy commissioned a professional heraldist, Mirelle Louis, to create a coat of arms for them which they adopted the same year. However the commission agreement only allowed Saint Barthélemy to freely use the new arms for administrative purposes, the heraldist retained the commercial rights to them. Saint Barthélemy later purchased the full rights from Louis for 90,000 francs, despite Louis demanding 500,000 francs.
