= Vehicle registration plates of Saint Barthélemy =

Overseas Collectivity of Saint Barthélemy
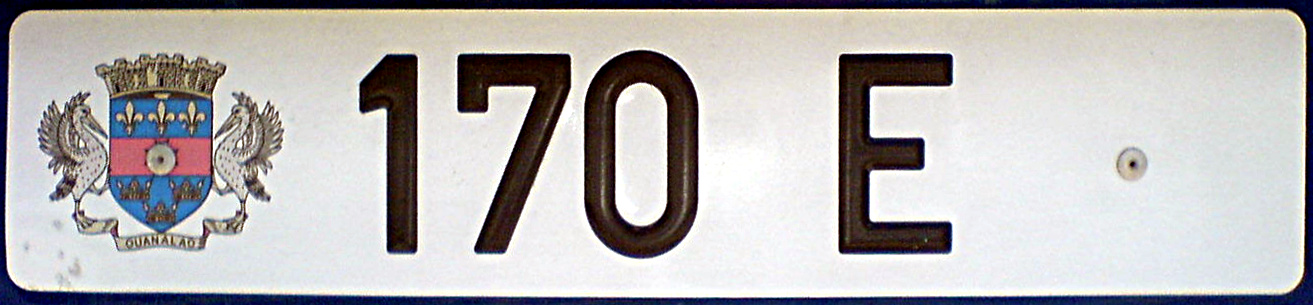
- Current regular legal standard number plate from Saint Barths (977), France.
- Country: Saint Barthélemy (France)
- Country code: F

Current series
- Size: 520 mm × 110 mm 20.5 in × 4.3 in
- Serial format: 12(3) A(B)
- Colour (front): Black on white
- Colour (rear): Black on white

Saint Barthélemy requires its residents to register their motor vehicles and display vehicle registration plates. Current plates are European standard 520 mm × 110 mm (20.5 in × 4.3 in), though the North American standard is also used, and use French stamping dies. The overseas departments and territories of France have three-digit codes, starting with 97, which was originally the single code for them all.

Image	First issued	Design	Serial format	Serials issued	Notes
	2009	Black on white, with St. Barths coat of arms to the left	123 A		
