= Scrub Island, Anguilla =

Island in Anguilla

Scrub Island
- Location within Anguilla Location within the Caribbean

Geography
- Location: Atlantic Ocean
- Coordinates: 18°17′15″N 62°56′50″W
- Archipelago: Antilles
- Area: 8 km^{2} (3.1 sq mi)

Administration
- United Kingdom
- British Overseas Territory: Anguilla

Additional information
- Time zone: AST (UTC-4)
- ISO code: AI

Scrub Island is an 8 km^{2} (3.1 sq mi) island lying off the eastern tip of the main island of Anguilla, a British Overseas Territory in the Caribbean. The island has been identified as an Important Bird Area by BirdLife International due to its importance as a breeding site for seabirds. The habitat on the island is mostly scrubland, with a rocky coastline of limestone fissures and cliffs interspersed with four sandy beaches. There are also several ponds and lagoons on the eastern and western sides of the island.

== Description ==
Scrub Island is located off the northeastern corner of Anguilla, with a 500 m (1,600 ft) wide channel dividing the two. It is largest of Anguilla offshore islands, with a total area of 8 km^{2} (3.1 sq mi). The habitat on the island is mostly scrubland, changing to fractured limestone and cliffs towards the shore. There is a complex of ponds and lagoons on the eastern side of the island, as well as one large pond on the western coast and four sandy beaches that intersperse the otherwise rocky shore. There are no permanent inhabitants of the island. An abandoned, unmetalled airstrip exists in the centre of the island, where it is slowly being overtaken by shrubs. The eastern side has some abandoned tourist buildings and the island is still occasionally the subject of proposals for resorts, although none are currently active. An MoU to develop a resort on the island was signed by the Anguillan government in 2012, while the island was also one of five sites under consideration for the construction of a superyacht marina in 2018. The island is privately owned. An overgrown plane strip and a plane wreck can be found on the island.

=== Fauna ===
The island has been identified as an Important Bird Area by BirdLife International, mainly because of its nesting seabirds. These are laughing gulls as well as royal, roseate, and least terns. Resident landbirds include Caribbean elaenias and pearly-eyed thrashers. The island's five species of reptiles comprise the Anguilla Bank ameiva, Anolis gingivinus, little dwarf gecko, island dwarf gecko and the endangered leeward island racer. Green and leatherback turtles have been recorded. The island is home to both feral goats and rats.
