= Morne de Vitet =

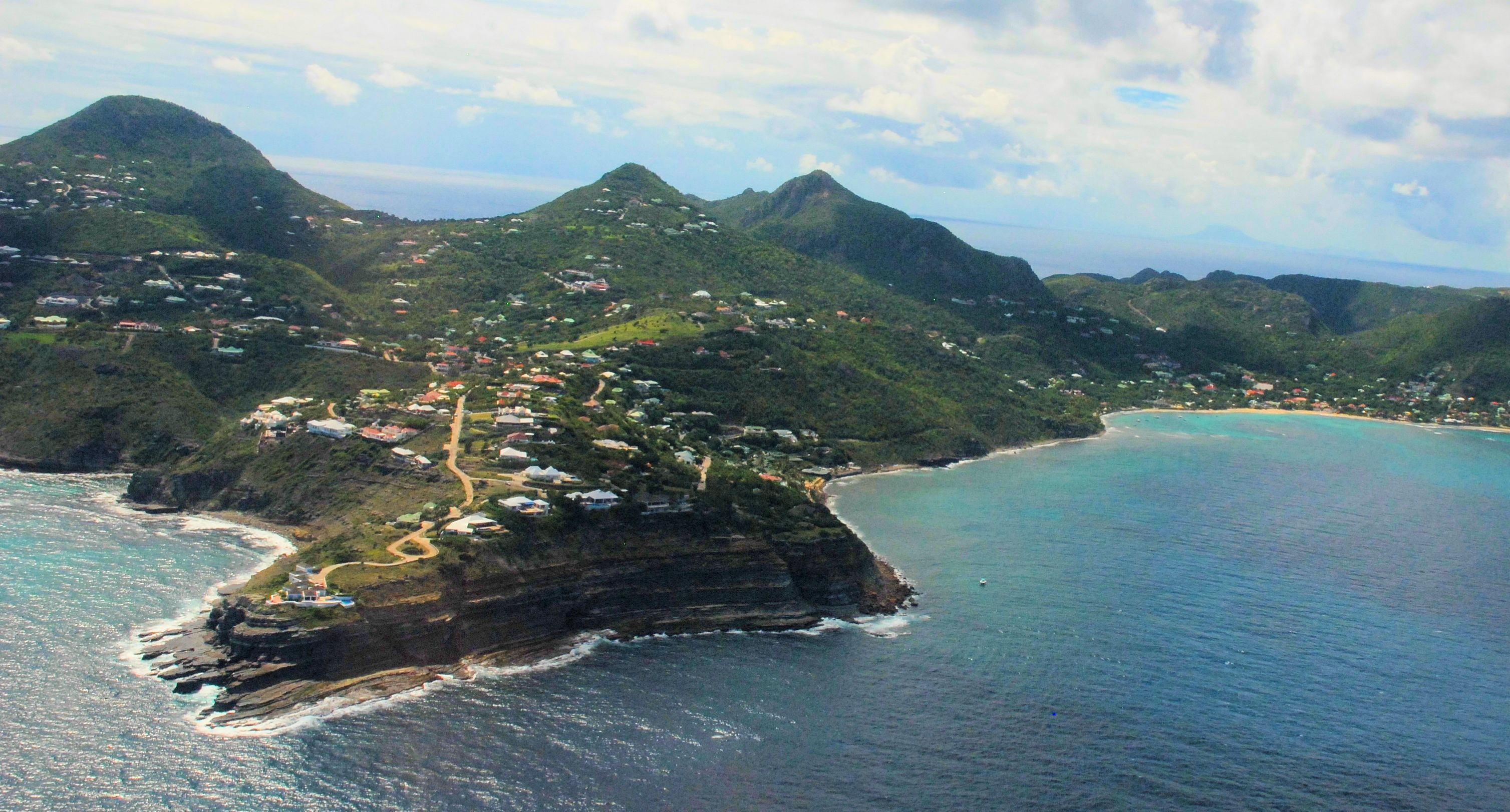
- View of Morne de Vitet at far left

Highest point
- Elevation: 286 m (938 ft)
- Prominence: 286 m (938 ft)
- Coordinates: 17°53′57″N 62°48′23″W

Geography
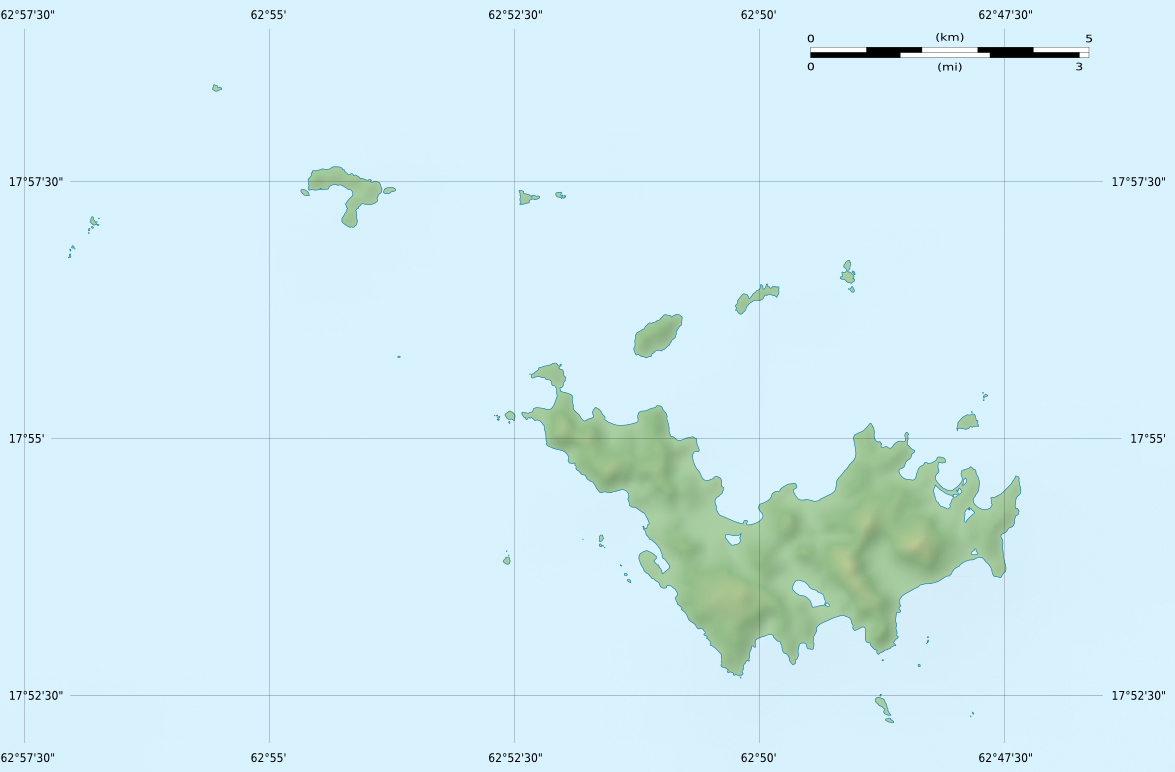
- Location within Saint Barthélemy
- Location: Saint Barthélemy

Morne de Vitet is the highest point of Saint Barthélemy, an overseas collectivity of France located in the Caribbean, with an elevation of 286 metres (938 ft). The mountain is located in the eastern part of the island.

The gentler slopes to the east and north are settled, while the steeper slopes to the west and south are free of buildings. The steepest slope is to the south, where it reaches the sea within a distance of 400 meters.
