= Île Fourchue =

Island in Saint-Barthélemy, France

Nickname: Five Islands
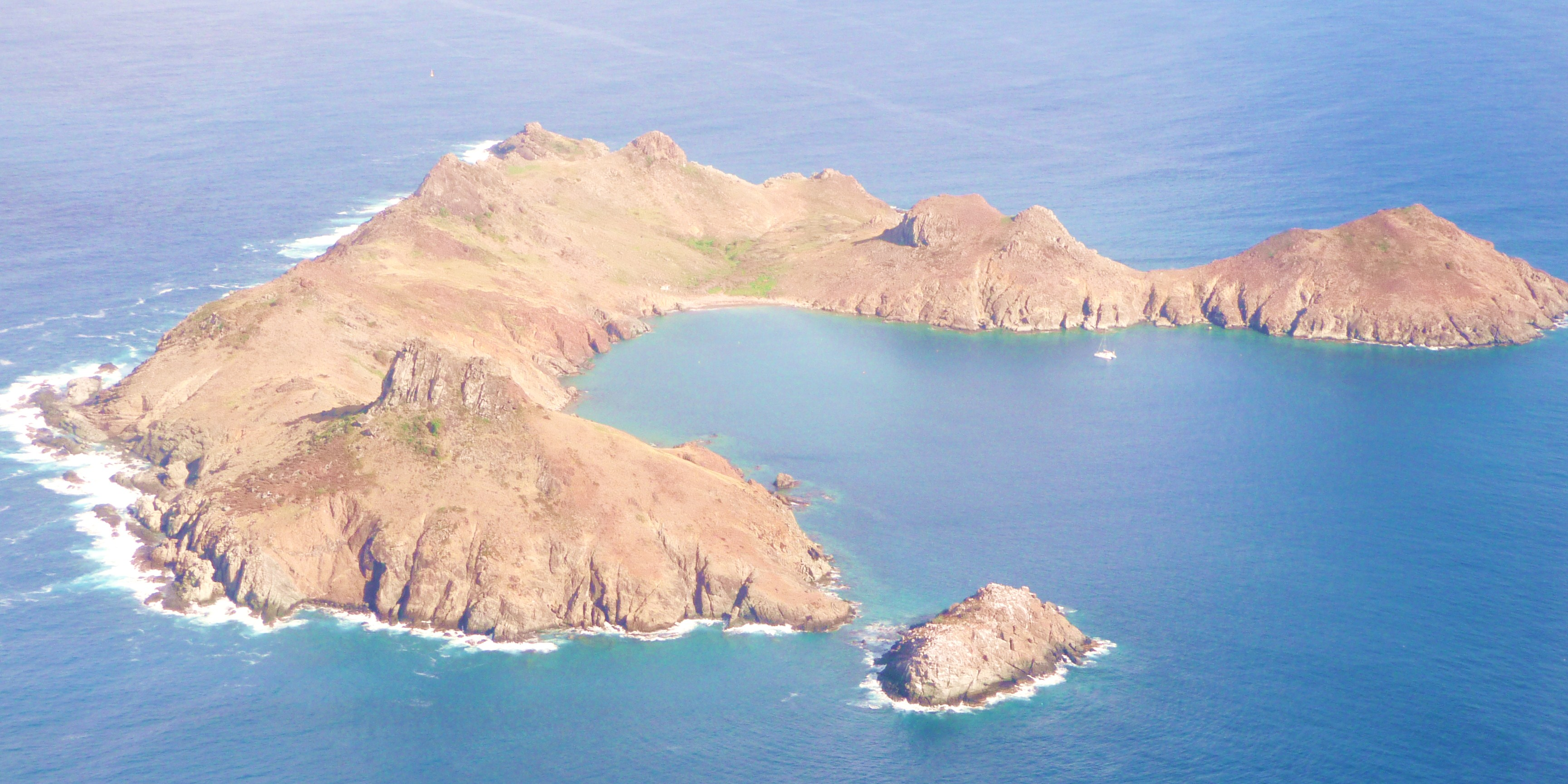
- Île Fourchue, with Petite Islette at bottom right

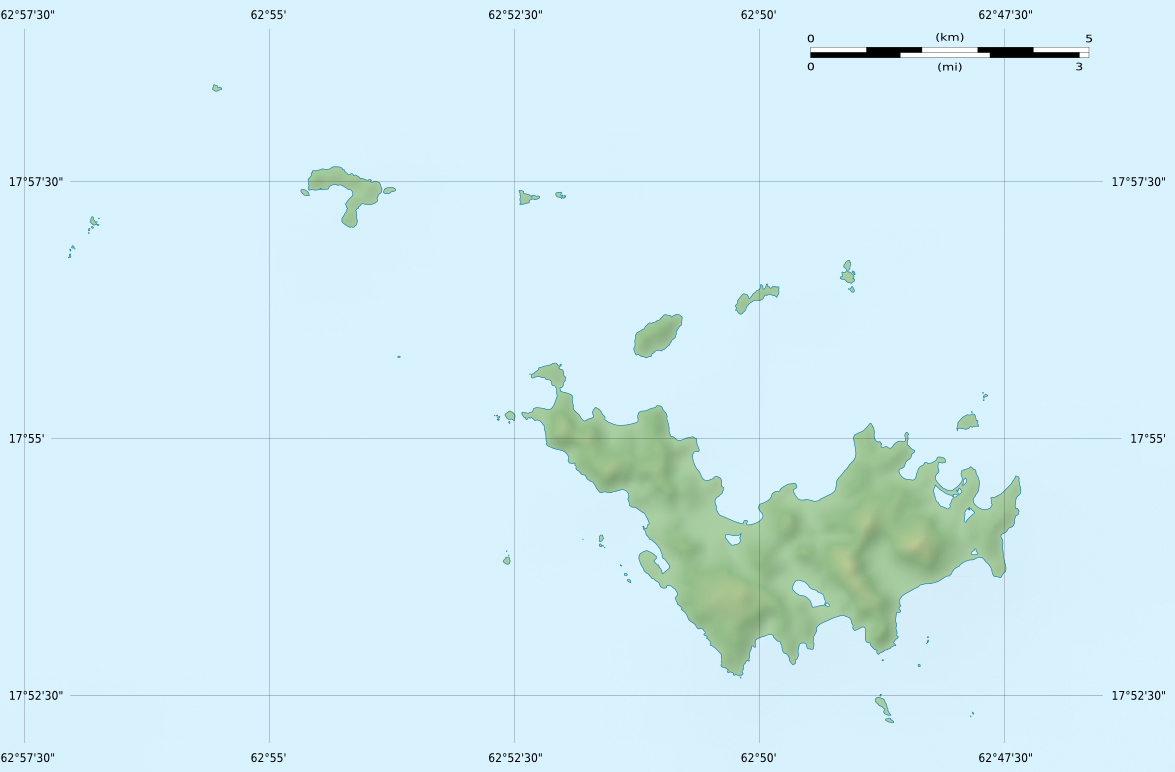
- Location within Saint Barthélemy Location within Lesser Antilles Location within the Caribbean

Geography
- Location: Caribbean
- Coordinates: 17°57′30″N 62°54′00″W
- Archipelago: Leeward Islands, Lesser Antilles
- Adjacent to: Saint Barthélemy Channel
- Area: 0.99 km^{2} (0.38 sq mi)
- Highest elevation: 103 m (338 ft)

Administration
- France; Saint Barthélemy

Demographics
- Population: 0

Additional information
- Time zone: AST (UTC-4)
- Réserve Naturelle de Saint-Barthélemy
- IUCN category II (national park)
- Location: Saint Barthélemy
- Area: 1,200 ha (3,000 acres)
- Established: 1996
- Governing body: Grenat Association
- Website: reservenaturellestbarth.com/en

Île Fourchue, also known as Île Fourche, is an island between Saint-Barthélemy and Saint Martin, belonging to the Collectivity of Saint Barthélemy. The island's inside is privately owned. It is located about 5 km north-west of the island of Saint Barthelemy. Previously, Fourchue Island was called Five Islands because of prominent five peaks visible from the distance. The highest point is 103 meter above sea level. It is situated within Réserve naturelle nationale de Saint-Barthélemy.

== History ==
Fourchue Island is known as the retreat of Balthazar Biguard, an immigrant from Marseille fleeing the French Revolution, Saint-Barthélemy being at that time Swedish territory. He ended up acquiring Swedish citizenship, living apart from the rest of the world until he died in 1827 at the age of 85. He is buried on this island.

== Important Bird Area ==
Petite Islette, a 1.3 ha, 33 m high, islet south-west of Fourchue, has been recognised as an Important Bird Area (IBA) by BirdLife International because it supports a breeding colony of brown boobies. Three species of reptiles are present: the Lesser Antillean iguana (endemic of the Lesser Antilles), Anguilla anole and Caribbean ameiva.
