= Morne =

Morne, Morné, Mörne, etc. may refer to:

== People ==
- Morné (given name)
- Arvid Mörne (1876–1946), Finnish author and poet
- Håkan Mörne (1900–1961), Fenno-Swedish journalist and author
- Maryland Morne (c. 1900–1935), American actress

== Places ==
- Morne a Chandelle, a village in the Sud-Est department of Haiti
- Morne-à-l'Eau, a commune in Guadeloupe
- Morne Bois-Pin, the fourth highest mountain in Haiti
- Morne la Vigie, hill and extinct cinder cone in Haiti
- Morne Ciseaux, a town on the island of Saint Lucia
- Morne Criquet, a quartier of Saint Barthélemy
- Morne de Dépoudré, a quartier of Saint Barthélemy in the Caribbean
- Morne de la Grande Montagne, the highest point of Saint Pierre and Miquelon
- Morne Diablotins, the highest mountain in Dominica
- Morne du Cibao, the third highest mountain in Haiti
- Morne du Vitet, the highest point of Saint Barthélemy
- Morne Docteur, a town in Saint George Parish, Grenada
- Morne Fendue, a town in Saint Patrick Parish, Grenada
- Morne Fortune, a hill and residential area located south of Castries, Saint Lucia
- Morne Jaloux, a town in Saint George Parish, Grenada
- Morne Jaloux Ridge, a town in Saint George Parish, Grenada
- Morne Longue, a town in Saint Andrew Parish, Grenada
- Morne Rachette, a village on the west coast of Dominica
- Morne Rouge (disambiguation)
- Morne Seychellois, the highest peak in Seychelles
- Morne Tranquille, a town in Saint David Parish, Grenada
- Morne Trois Pitons National Park, a World Heritage Site in Dominica
- Morne Watt, a stratovolcano in the south of the island of Dominica
- Gros Morne (disambiguation)
- Le Morne Brabant, a peninsula at the extreme south-western tip of Mauritius
- Le Morne-Vert, a commune in the French overseas department of Martinique

== Other ==
- Morne (heraldry), properly morné, an attitude of beasts in heraldry
- Morne Constant anole (Anolis ferreus), a species of anole lizard endemic to the island of Marie-Galante

== See also ==
- Morn (disambiguation)
- Mourn (disambiguation)
- Mourne (disambiguation)
