= Fabian Wrede =

Fabian Wrede may refer to:

- Fabian Wrede, Count of Östanå (1641–1712), Swedish Count and advisor to King Charles XI of Sweden
- Fabian Wrede (1694–1768), Swedish politician
- Fabian Casimir Wrede (1724–1795), Swedish general and military engineer
- Fabian Wrede (1760–1824), Swedish Field Marshal and a main supporter for the movement to make Jean-Baptiste Bernadotte king of Sweden
- Fabian Wrede-class training ship, Finnish Navy vessel class named for Fabian Casimir Wrede
