= Svensk uppslagsbok =

Swedish encyclopedia

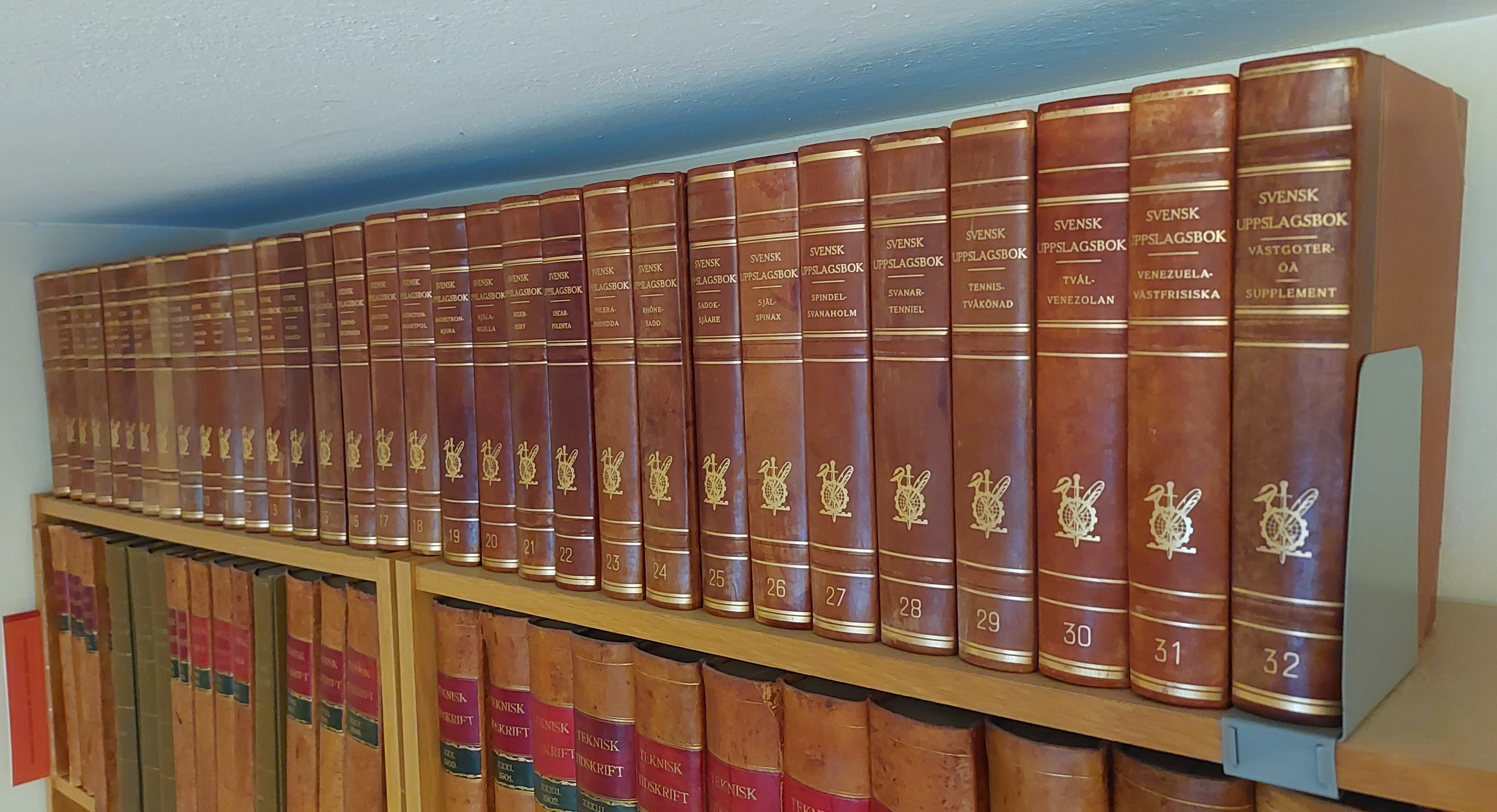
- 2nd ed., 32 volumes
- Country: Sweden
- Language: Swedish
- Published: 1929–1939 (first edition); 1947–1955 (second edition)

Svensk uppslagsbok is a Swedish encyclopedia published between 1929 and 1955, in two editions.

== First edition ==
The first edition was started in 1929 by Baltiska förlaget AB, but publishing was taken over by Svensk uppslagsbok AB in 1931. This edition consisted of 30 volumes and one supplement volume, and was completed in 1937. The articles in Svensk uppslagsbok were written by subject matter experts and signed.

On the market, it competed with Nordisk familjebok in its third, condensed edition (1923–1937), and it aimed at being affordable for a large audience.

== Second edition ==
A second, completely revised edition was published between 1947 and 1955, and consisted of 32 volumes. The publisher Svensk uppslagsbok AB was renamed Förlagshuset Norden AB in 1945.

For the rest of the 1950s and until the early 1970s, only significantly smaller Swedish encyclopedia projects were started. The second edition of Svensk uppslagsbok thus remained the most recently published large Swedish-language encyclopedia until the first edition of Bra böckers lexikon was published in 1973–1981, and its size was only truly matched when Nationalencyklopedin was published in 1989–1996.
