= Penningby Castle =

Medieval-period private castle located in Uppland, Sweden

Coordinates: 59°40′53″N 18°40′21″E

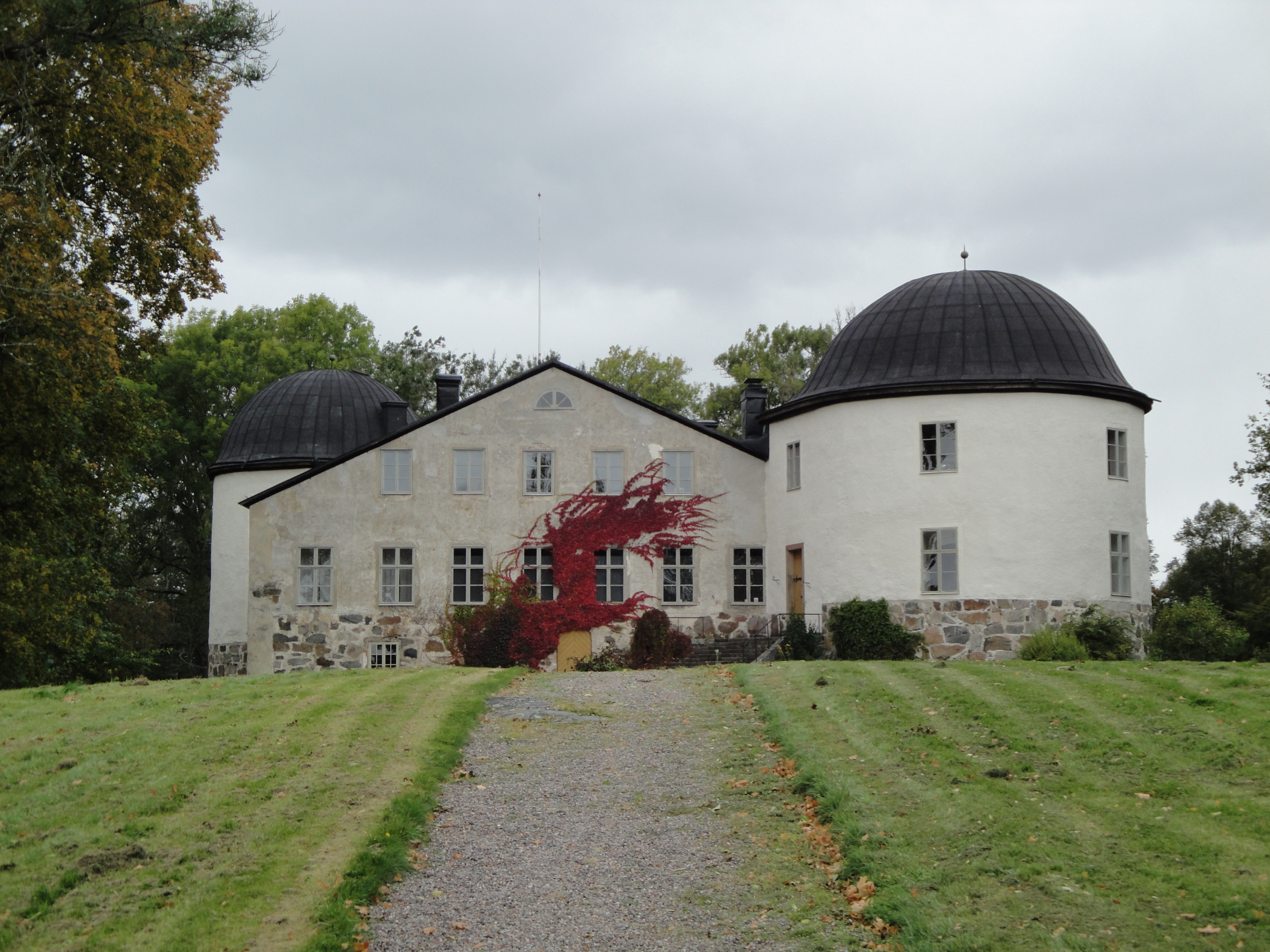
Penningby Castle, frontside.

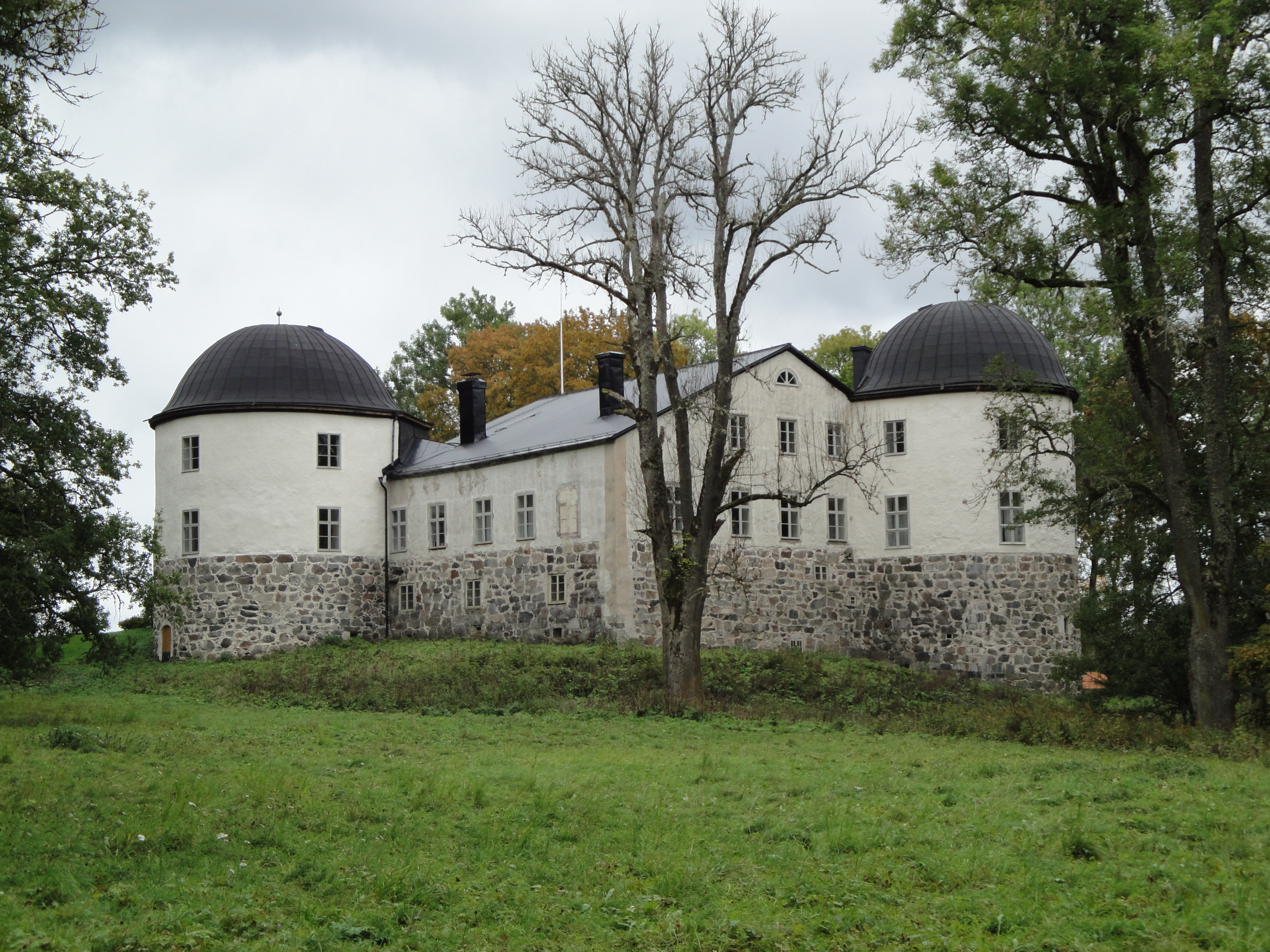
Penningby Castle, backside.

Penningby Castle (Swedish: Penningby slott) is a medieval-period private castle located the Länna parish of Norrtälje Municipality in Uppland, 70 kilometres north of Stockholm, Sweden. Penningby situated in the valley near Edsviken, a narrow inlet in the Saltsjön bay of the Baltic Sea.

== History ==
One of the most well-preserved castles from the Vasa era, the Penningby Manor is first mentioned in the 1380s. To the northeast is an overgrown ruin castle with a moat, which may be the remains of a predecessor to the castle. Its earliest owners included Lord Tord Bonde, burgrave of Raseborg and margrave of Viborg. In late 15th century, a fortress was built by its owners, initiated by Lady Birgitta Tordsdotter Bonde, daughter of Tord Karlsson (Bonde), Lord High Constable of Sweden. The medieval castle was a so-called twin house unusual in its placement near the sea coast. The immense tower was erected just before the 1550s under Lord Lars Turesson, Tre Rosor. In his time, the eastern façade got a new entrance. Later, the sea tower got its round salon, arguably the most beautiful room in the castle.

In the late 1700s, Fabian Casimir Wrede added to the fertile land on the castle grounds. Wrede drained marshes around Penningby and increased the estate's grain and hay production over a period of fourteen years.

In 1805 countess Maria Juliana von Rosen had the castle garden recreated in a so-called English style. In 1831, a fire destroyed the interiors of the castle, but parts of it, for example the ceiling, were restored, and the tower was modified. A section of the medieval walls are yet left. A restoration was carried out from 1951 to 1953. Penningby castle was declared a national cultural heritage (byggnadsminne) in 1980. Today the castle is not inhabited, but visitors may have access to it in summers.

Olof Persson Stille, one of the early settlers in New Sweden, was employed on the Penningby Manor. In 1641 Olof Stille, a millwright by trade, was the original owner of the area which is today Eddystone, Pennsylvania. Stille was one of the four commissaries or magistrates appointed to administer justice among local inhabitants, and thus became a judge of the first court on the banks of the Delaware River.

== Notable people ==
- Svante Nilsson (ca.1460–1512) a Swedish nobleman and regent of Sweden from 1504 to 1512. He was born at Penningby Castle.

== Sources ==
This article is fully or partially based on material from Nordisk familjebok, Penningby, 1904-1926.
