= Skaraborg Regiment =

Skaraborg Regiment may refer to:

- Skaraborg Regiment (infantry), Swedish Army infantry regiment (1624–1942)
- Skaraborg Regiment (armoured), Swedish Army armoured regiment (1963–1974, 2000–)
