= Fabian Wrede (1694–1768) =

Swedish politician (1694–1768)

Baron Fabian Wrede
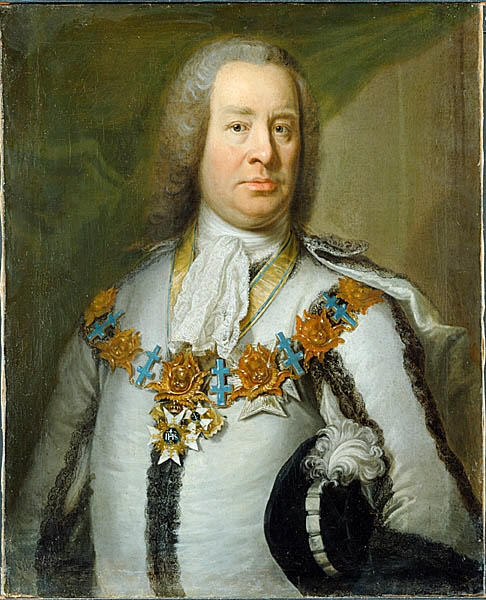
- Fabian Wrede painted by Johan Henrik Scheffel in 1768.

Member of the Privy Council of Sweden
- In office 1746–1756
- Monarchs: Frederick I of Sweden, Adolf Frederick of Sweden
- Parliamentary group: Hats

Personal details
- Born: April 8, 1694 Peippola, Finland
- Died: February 17, 1768 (aged 73) Fogelstad, Sweden
- Spouse: Baroness Catharina Charlotta Sparre (m. 1715; died 1759)
- Children: 8 (including Fabian Casimir Wrede and Elsa Beata Bunge)
- Parent(s): Baron Fabian Carlsson Wrede; Helena Gustaviana Duwall
- Military career
- Allegiance: Sweden; Duchy of Holstein-Gottorp or Dutch Republic
- Service years: 1709–1743
- Rank: Colonel (Sweden); Major General (Holstein or Dutch Republic)
- Commands: General War Commissioner (1741–1743)
- Conflicts: Great Northern War; Battle of Helsingborg; Battle of Gadebusch; Siege of Tönning (POW); Russo-Swedish War of 1741–1743
- Awards: Knight of the Order of the Seraphim (1748); Commander of the Order of the Sword (1748)

Baron Fabian Wrede af Elimä (8 April 1694 – 17 February 1768) was a Swedish nobleman, military officer, and politician during the Age of Liberty. Wrede fought in the Great Northern War and spent two decades in foreign service, attaining the rank of Major General. Upon his return to Sweden, he became an influential member of the Hats, managing French financial subsidies for the party. During the Russo-Swedish War of 1741–1743, he served as General War Commissioner and acted as a negotiator for the Capitulation at Helsingfors. Wrede advocated for the candidacy of Adolf Frederick of Holstein-Gottorp at the 1742 Riksdag of the Estates to become the heir to Frederick I. His political career culminated in his appointment to the Privy Council of Sweden (Riksråd) in 1746, a position he held until his resignation in 1756.

== Early life ==
Fabian Wrede was born on April 8, 1694, in Peippola, Finland to Baron Fabian Carlsson Wrede and Helena Gustaviana Duwall. He was born to the Finnish-Swede Wrede noble family. He held the title of Baron by birthright, a title granted to his grandfather by Queen Christina in 1654, as a posthumous reward for the actions of his great-grandfather, Henrik Wrede. During the Battle of Kircholm in 1605, Henrik Wrede saved the life of King Charles IX of Sweden by giving the King his own horse after the King's horse had been killed, allowing the king to flee the battlefield. Henrik Wrede was subsequently encircled and killed.

== Military career ==
Fabian Wrede painted in 1726 by Andreas Møller

Wrede began his military career as a volunteer in the Åbo and Björneborg County Cavalry Regiment in 1709. In 1711, he transferred to the Västmanland Regiment where he held the rank of First-Ensign, seeing action at the battles of Helsingborg and Gadebusch in 1710 and 1712 respectively. In 1713, he was taken prisoner at the Siege of Tönning and in 1714, he would escape from captivity and return to Sweden. A year after his escape, Wrede was promoted to Lieutenant and transferred to the Östergötland Infantry Regiment and in 1717 he would be promoted to captain. In 1720, he was transferred to the Skaraborg Regiment.

The exact timeline of Wrede's subsequent departure from Swedish service is recorded differently across major biographical works. According to Adam Lewenhaupt's Karl XII:s officerare, Wrede resigned his Swedish commission in 1721 and later entered Holstein service as a major in 1724. Conversely, Gustaf Elgenstierna's Ättartavlor states that Wrede remained with the Skaraborg Regiment, advancing to regiment quartermaster in 1722, before officially resigning on 11 December 1724 to enter Dutch service as a major. (Note: Older general biographical references, such as Nordisk familjebok and Svenskt biografiskt handlexikon, compress these events further by asserting he transferred directly to Holstein service as early as 1719.) He eventually reached the rank of Major General in 1738, during his tenure in foreign service before returning to Sweden to resume his domestic military and political career.

In 1741, Wrede returned to Swedish service, and at the request of the Estates he was given the commission of a Colonel. During The Hats' War he was appointed General War Commissioner (generalkrigskommissar) due to his knowledge on Finnish terrain and conditions. Wrede negotiated the Capitulation at Helsingfors in 1742.

== Political career ==
Wrede was a member of the Hats. French financial subsidies for the Hats were handled by him. In 1739, he sat on the Secret Committee (Sekreta utskottet) that deliberated on Frederick I's relationship with Hedvig Taube. Wrede was one of the harshest critics of the relationship.

During the Riksdag of the Estates in 1742, when the matter of Swedish succession arose, Wrede supported Adolf Frederick of Holstein-Gottorp to become the heir to Frederick I. He greatly opposed the candidacy of Crown Prince Frederick of Denmark, even going so far as to threaten that Finland would defect to Russia if he were elected heir. In 1746, he was appointed to the Privy Council of Sweden (Riksråd). In 1748, he was made Knight of the Royal Order of the Seraphim and Commander of the Royal Order of the Sword. Wrede resigned from the Council in 1756 and would retire at Fogelstad.

== Properties ==
Wrede amassed a great fortune from his position as General War Commissioner (generalkrigskommissar). He used that fortune to purchase Fogelstad in the 1750s. Upon the death of his father, he inherited manors at Peippola, Mustila and Moisio in Finland. When his brother Henrik Jakob Wrede died in 1758, he jointly became owner of Anjala and Villikkala with his brother Otto Gustaf Wrede. In 1759, Wrede ceded Anjala to his third brother in exchange for Yxkullsund.

== Personal life and death ==
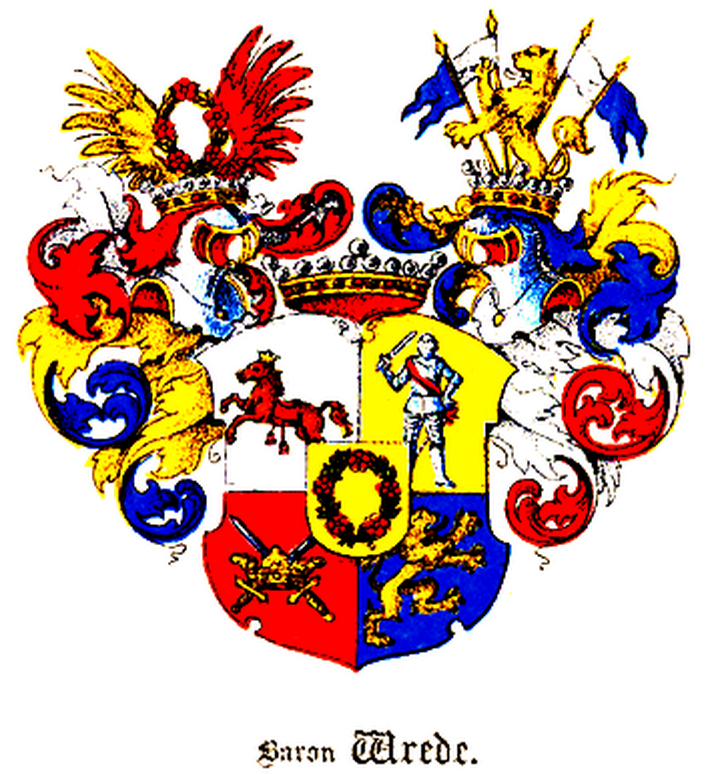
Wrede's coat of arms

Wrede married Baroness Catharina Charlotta Sparre (1684–1759) in 1715. She was the daughter of Baron Jakob Casimir Sparre and Brita Leijonhufvud. Together, the couple had eight children, though only four would survive to adulthood.

- Gustaviana Brita Wrede (1717–1725), died in infancy.
- Agneta Wrede (1718–1800), married Baron David Stierncrona.
- Lucia Margareta Wrede (1721–1722), died in infancy.
- Helena Sofia Wrede (b.1723), died same year.
- Fabian Casimir Wrede (1724–1795), general and military engineer.
- Anna Beata Wrede (1727–1791), married Baron Hans Gustaf Gyllengranat.
- Carl Henrik Wrede (1728–1729), died in infancy.
- Elsa Beata Wrede (1734–1819), married Count Sven Bunge.

Wrede died on 17 February 1768 at Fogelstad.

== See also ==
- List of knights of the Order of the Seraphim

== Works cited ==
- Elgenstierna, Gustaf (1936). "Friherrliga ätten Wrede af Elimä, nr 44 (Tab. 18)". Den introducerade svenska adelns ättartavlor (in Swedish). Vol. IX (Wrangel–Östner). Stockholm: P. A. Norstedt & Söners Förlag – via Project Runeberg.
- Hofberg, Herman (1906). Svenskt biografiskt handlexikon (in Swedish). Stockholm: Albert Bonniers Förlag. p. 751 – via Project Runeberg.
- Lewenhaupt, Adam (1920). Karl XII:s officerare: Biografiska anteckningar (in Swedish). Stockholm: P. A. Norstedt & Söners Förlag. p. 779 – via Project Runeberg.
- Westrin, Theodor, ed. (1921). "Wrede, 3. Fabian". Nordisk familjebok (in Swedish). Vol. 32 (Werth–Väderkvarn) (2nd (Uggleupplagan) ed.). Stockholm: Nordisk familjeboks förlags aktiebolag. pp. 1147–1149 – via Project Runeberg.
