= Morn =

Morn may refer to:

== Characters ==
- Bran Mak Morn, a character in Robert E. Howard pulp fiction
- Eris Morn, a character in Destiny video games
- Morn (Star Trek), a character in Star Trek: Deep Space Nine
- Morn, the main character in Vladimir Nabokov's verse play The Tragedy of Mister Morn
- Randal Morn, a character in the Dungeons & Dragons module The Return of Randal Morn

== Other uses ==
- Mandalselva (Mǫrn), a river in Norway
- Nicolas Morn (1932–1997), Luxembourgish cyclist
- Reed Morn (1898–1978), Estonian writer

== See also ==
- Morning
- Morne (disambiguation)
- Mourn (disambiguation)
- Mourne (disambiguation)
