= Gros Morne =

Gros Morne or Gros-Morne may refer to:

- Gros-Morne, Artibonite, a commune in the Artibonite department in Haiti
- Gros Morne, Grand'Anse, rural settlement in the Moron commune of Haiti
- Gros-Morne, Martinique, a commune in the French overseas department of Martinique
- Gros Morne, Newfoundland, a mountain located in western Newfoundland
- Gros Morne National Park, on the west coast of Newfoundland
- Gros Morne, Réunion, a volcanic peak on the island of Réunion
- Gros Morne, Saint Lucia, a mountain located in the Castries District of Saint Lucia
- Gros Morne, Trinidad, a mount part of the Trinity Hills

== See also ==
- Gros (disambiguation)
- Morne (disambiguation)
