= Elsa Beata Bunge =

Swedish botanist, writer

- Born: Elsa Beata Wrede; 18 April 1734; Peppiola, Sweden (now in Finland)
- Died: 19 January 1819 (aged 84); Beateberga, Sweden
- Occupations: botanist and writer
- Known for: As botanist and writer
- Spouse: Sven Bunge

Elsa Beata Bunge, née Wrede (18 April 1734 – 24 January 1819), was a Swedish botanist, writer and noble.

== Biography ==
Elsa Beata was born 18 April 1734. She was the daughter of statesman and noble, baron Fabian Wrede, and Katarina Charlotta Sparre. One of her brothers was Fabian Casimir Wrede. In 1761, she married the statesman Count Sven Bunge. She was an enthusiastic amateur botanist and had large greenhouses set up at her manor Beateberga; the name of the estate means "The Mountain of Beata". Her husband was a member of the Royal Swedish Academy of Sciences and she corresponded with Carl von Linné and other academy members.

She became well known as a botanist and wrote the botanical work Om vinrankors beskaffenhet efter sjelfva naturens anvisningar (English: "About the nature of vine grapes by direction from nature itself") with tables (1806), the work for which she was recognised as a botanist.

As a person, Countess Bunge aroused attention because of her way of dressing as a man, with the exception of a skirt. A lot of stories and anecdotes are told about her. During the reign of Gustav III (1771–1792), the monarch noticed a peculiarly dressed woman in the Royal Swedish Opera and enquired who she was. Bunge replied "Tell His Majesty that I am the daughter of statesman Fabian Wrede and married to statesman Sven Bunge."

Bunge participated in the custom in the mid 18th-century of criticizing people by anonymous poems: she is believed to have been the author of the satirical libel work Kom kära Armod lät oss vandra (Come, dear Poverty, let us go) toward the notoriously stingy chamberlain Conrad Lohe.

== Died ==
Bunge died on Beateberga manor in Röö Parish in 1819.

== Work ==
Her pamphlets include;

- Bref till Eglé, om sättet att med minsta kostnad plantera vinrankor, i Sverige; samt befordra dem till ymnig bördighet, tidig och fullkomlig mognad (1803)
- Om vinrankors beskaffenhet efter sjelfva naturens anvisningar (1806)

== See also ==
- Eva Ekeblad
- Maria Christina Bruhn

== Sources ==
- Sten Lindroth (Swedish): Kungl. Svenska vetenskapsakademiens historia 1739-1818: Tiden intill Wargentins död 1783
- Svenska Linné-sällskapet, Volym 2006 (Swedish)
- Samlaren / Femtonde årgången. 1894 /
