= Morne Bois-Pin =

Mountain in Haiti

- Location within Haiti

Highest point
- Elevation: 2,235 m (7,333 ft)
- Coordinates: 18°21′N 72°14′W

Geography
- Location: Haiti

Morne Bois-Pin (French pronunciation: [mɔʁn bwa pɛ̃]) is the fourth highest mountain in Haiti. It is 2,235 metres (7,333 ft) above sea level. The three taller Haitian mountains are Pic la Selle, Pic Macaya, and Morne du Cibao.
