= Nordisk familjeboks sportlexikon =

Swedish-language sports encyclopedia

Nordisk familjeboks sportlexikon: uppslagsverk för sport, gymnastik och friluftsliv (lit. 'Nordic Family Book Sport Lexicon: Encyclopedia for Sport, Gymnastics, and Outdoor Life') is a Swedish-language sports encyclopedia, published in six volumes between 1938 and 1946, with a supplemental volume in 1949. Since 2017, it is digitised by Projekt Runeberg.

== Background ==
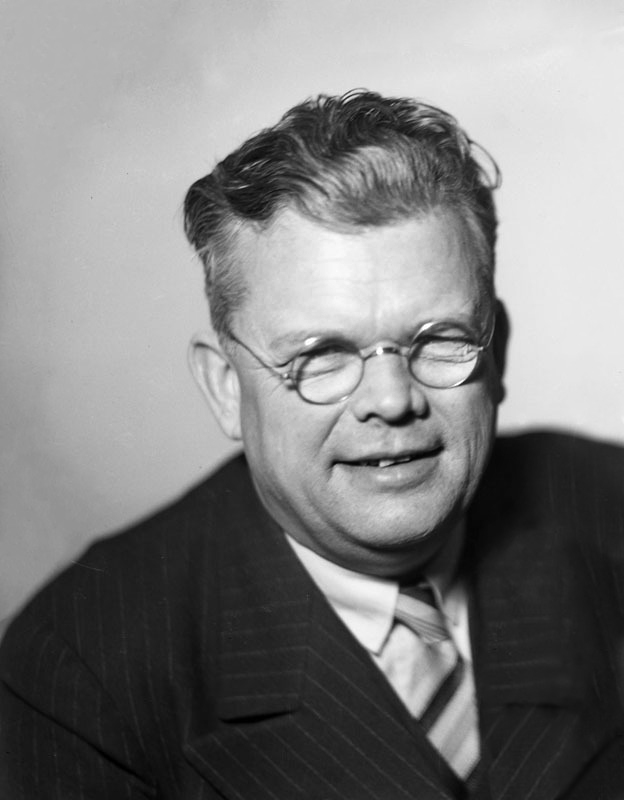
Erik Bergvall, part of the editorial committee

The encyclopedia was published by Nordisk familjebok and first presented in 1937. Åke Svahn was the main editor and Nils Hellsten was assistant editor, while the editorial committee included Erik Bergvall, Folke Bernadotte, Sigfrid Edström, Rolf von Heidenstam, Ivar Holmquist, Anton Johanson, Martin P. Nilsson, Torsten Tegnér, and Bertil Uggla. Martti Jukola was editor for Finland.

By 1943 and its fifth volume, the encyclopedia had 18,000 subscribers.

The volumes of Nordisk familjeboks sportlexikon are:

1. A – brännboll
2. bröstsim – flugfiske
3. flugvikt – hjärtstock
4. hockey – Lahtinen
5. Lahtis–röse
6. S–Övrevoll

== Reception ==
Swedish newspaper Svenska Dagbladet signature Oleg found the first band, dealing with A to brännboll, the best sport lexicon they had seen. According to the same paper, French Minister of National Education and Fine Arts Jean Zay was greeting the high standard of the work.

== Digitisation ==
In 2012, Lars Aronsson offered to digitise Nordisk familjeboks sportlexikon if funded. In September 2017, the digitisation of the six bands was complete and in February 2020, the supplemental band was digitised.
