= Morné (given name) =

List of people that share the same given name

Morné is a South African or Namibian masculine given name. Notable people with the name include:

- Morné du Plessis (born 1949), former South African rugby union player
- Morné Engelbrecht (born 1988), South African-born Namibian cricketer
- Morné Hanekom (born 1988), South African rugby union player
- Morné Karg (born 1977), Namibian cricketer
- Morné Morkel (born 1984), South African cricketer
- Morné Nagel (born 1978), South African sprinter
- Morné Schreuder (born 1979), Namibian rugby union player
- Morné Steyn (born 1984), South African rugby union player
- Morné van den Berg (born 1997), South African rugby union player
- Morné van Wyk (born 1979), South African cricketer

== See also ==
- Morne (disambiguation)
