= Håkan Mörne =

Arvid Håkan Mörne (5 December 1900 in Helsinki – 24 December 1961 in Mariehamn) was a Finland Swedish journalist and author.

== Biography ==
Håkan Mörne was the son of the poet Arvid Mörne and Signe Antoinette Hagelstam. He married Svanhild Danielsen in 1926. After graduating in 1921, he studied chemistry at the University of Helsinki and the Braunschweig University of Technology in Germany from 1922 to 1924.

Mörne worked for a year in 1926–1927 as a journalist for the newspaper Allas krönika, but he enjoyed the sea best and went to sea as a young man and worked with travel descriptions and foreign reports. In his writing, he preferred to depict everyday life, rather than the famous tourist destinations, in the countries he visited. Some of his texts can be classified as essays while others take the form of social reports.

From 1945, he lived on Åland and devoted himself there to fruit growing.

== Awards and honours ==
- He was awarded the Lybeck Prize in 1939.

== Bibliography ==
From Mörne's rich production can be mentioned:

- From Port to Port: Notes from a Sea Journey (1927),
- The Adventurous Roads (1929),
- On Roads Without a Goal, short stories (1927),
- The Kingdom of the Elephant and the Dragon (1931),
- On Adventures in the Primeval Forests of South America (1932), abridged edition of The Adventurous Roads
- The Equator. Exotic Short Stories (1932),
- While the Mistral Blows (1933),
- Beautiful and Wild Balkans (1935),
- The Wing Sailed to Rome (1935),
- African Troubles: Experiences in Abyssinia, Somaliland, Sudan, Egypt and Palestine (1936),
- Destined to Yemen, novel (1937),
- Weathered Fairyland (1938),
- The Winter of Glory (1940),
- Alfred the Wanderer (1943),
- The Enchanted Island (1946),
- The Gilded Poverty: A Journey in Central America (1949),
- Spanish Paradise. A Journey in Andalusia (1951),
- Bread of the Sea, novel, (1954),
- Volcanoes and Bananas (1956), abridged edition of The Gilded Poverty,
- Lands of the Evening Sun: A Journey in Portugal AND Galicia, (1956),
- The Sources of Fire, novel (1958),
- Home at Night, novel (1959).

=== Translations ===
- Richard Katz: Among White Men and Colored (1928)
- Leo Perutz: The Swedish Rider (1937)

== Sources ==
- Bra Böckers lexicon, 1978
- "Mörne, Håkan". elmerinfo.net, Kirjailijatietokanta.
