= Tord Bonde =

Swedish magnate

Lord Tord Röriksson, nicknamed Bonde, Lord of Penningby (born in the 1350s, died 21 March 1417, Toordh Bonde in his era's Old Swedish language; Tord Bonde in today Swedish) was a medieval Swedish magnate.

== Biography ==
Tord Bonde was born into the highest nobility of his era's Sweden. His parents were lord Rörik Tordsson (of the Bonde) and Lady Märta Gisladotter (of the so-called Sparre of Aspnäs). Tord Bonde was married to Lady Ramborg Nilsdotter (of the Vasa family). On 8 September 1378, he issued a letter in Raseborg in which his father-in-law's name is mentioned: Nils Kettilsson (Vasa).

Quite young, he was entrusted with the position of castellan of Raseborg, Finland. He was knighted and appointed a Royal Councillor. Later, he allied himself with Queen Margaret I of Denmark and benefited from being her trusted agent. In 1403, lord Tord received an appointment as chatelain of Viipuri castle and county, at which office he would serve until his death.

In 1404, he started to launch offensives against the Russians, which led to a new treaty. In September 1408, hostilities opened again. Tord Bonde fought the Russians by, for example, using sea piracy against their commerce. In 1409, another treaty brought further advantages to the Swedish. Around 1411 Russians, having felt that Viipuri was a haven of hostile actions and aggression, launched an attack. Most of the town was destroyed. However, the castle did not surrender, the besiegers ultimately retreated, and peace was restored.

His son Knut Bonde died in 1413, a couple of years after having had a son of his own, Charles Knutsson (1408–70), who would become King of Sweden in 1448. Tord's second son was Karl Bonde, and Tord's daughter Margareta Tordsdotter married lord Ivar Nilson. His other grandchildren included the marshal Tord Carlsson Bonde and Lady Ingeborg Ivarsdotter, who would become the mother of five of the Tott Axelssons.
