= Fabian Casimir Wrede =

Swedish general and military engineer (1724–1795)

Baron Fabian Casimir Wrede
- Portrait of Fabian Casimir Wrede, from Garnisonsmuseet Skaraborg
- Born: 28 January 1724; Spånga, Mjölby, Östergötland, Sweden
- Died: 27 August 1795 (aged 71); Penningby Castle, Sweden
- Burial place: Östra Vingåker Church
- Spouse(s): Catharina Charlotta Fleming af Liebelitz (m. 1760; died 1764) Ottiliana Charlotta Fleming af Liebelitz (m. 1765; died 1795)
- Children: 10, including Fabian Wrede
- Relatives: Fabian Wrede (1694–1768) (father); Elsa Beata Bunge (sister)
- Military career
- Allegiance: Sweden; Kingdom of France; Habsburg Monarchy
- Branch: (Sweden) Swedish Army (Kingdom of France) French Royal Army (Habsburg monarchy) Imperial Austrian Army
- Service years: 1738–1788
- Rank: General (Sweden); Lieutenant colonel (France)
- Units: Swedish Fortification Corps; Life Guards; Kymmenegård Battalion; Skaraborg Regiment; Uppland Regiment
- Commands: Swedish Fortification Corps; Skaraborg Regiment; Uppland Regiment
- Known for: Construction of Svartholm fortress & Suomenlinna
- Conflicts: Russo-Swedish War; War of the Austrian Succession; Battle of Wissembourg; Siege of Fribourg; Battle of Pfaffenhofen; Siege of Maastricht; Seven Years' War; Siege of Prague; Battle of Kuttenberg; Battle of Kolín; Siege of Schweidnitz; Pomeranian War
- Awards: Commander Grand Cross and Knight of the Order of the Sword; Knight of the Order of Vasa
- Other work: co-inventing the Swedish tiled stove President of the Royal Swedish Academy of Sciences

Baron Fabian Casimir Wrede af Elimä (28 January 1724 – 27 August 1795) was a Swedish nobleman, general, and military engineer who achieved high rank in the Swedish, French and Austrian armies. As Commander of the Fortifications, Wrede oversaw the construction of Svartholm fortress and Suomenlinna. Beyond his military career, he is known for co-inventing the Swedish tiled stove in 1767. His agricultural work led to his election to the Royal Swedish Academy of Sciences, where he later served as its president in 1789. The Finnish Navy's Fabian Wrede-class training ship is named for him.

== Early life ==
Fabian Casimir Wrede was born on 28 January 1724 at Spånga in Mjölby, Östergötland. Wrede was the son of Swedish politician, military officer, and Privy Councillor, Baron Fabian Wrede and Baroness Katarina Charlotta Sparre. Wrede was the fourth of seven children; his siblings included the botanist Elsa Beata Bunge. He was a baron by birthright and born to the Wrede noble family.

== Military career ==
=== Early Swedish service (1738–1742) ===
Wrede began his military career by volunteering at the Swedish Fortification Corps in 1738 and became a non-commissioned officer in the Life Guards in 1741. During the Russo-Swedish War, Wrede served as Adjutant to Lieutenant General Henrik Magnus Buddenbrock and Major General Daniel johan Zander, while holding a lieutenant's commission in the Kymmenegård light infantry battalion in 1742.

=== French service (1742–1748) ===
Wrede entered French service during the War of the Austrian Succession in 1742. In 1744, he arrived at the camp of François de Franquetot de Coigny and he participated in the Battle of Wissembourg, where he led a picket into the city during street fighting. He was also present at the Siege of Fribourg. Wrede was appointed Adjutant General to the Philippe Henri, Marquis de Ségur, serving under his command at the Battle of Pfaffenhofen.

Wrede took part in the French retreat across the Rhine under Louis François, Prince of Conti in 1745. In 1748, Wrede was commissioned as a Grenadier Captain in Axel von Fersen's Royal Swedish Regiment. During the Siege of Maastricht later that year, Wrede discovered an unexploded enemy mine, saving his company and those who followed. He eventually advanced to the rank of Lieutenant Colonel in the French service.

=== First return to Sweden (1748–1757) ===
Following Wrede's first stint abroad, upon his return to Sweden, he was appointed chief adjutant to Crown Prince Adolf Fredrik in 1748 as per Augustin Ehrensvärd's wishes. In 1749, he was made Lieutenant General Quartermaster in the Swedish Fortifications Corps. In the same year, Wrede would begin supervising the construction of Svartholm fortress and fortifications in Loviisa which would last 6 years. In this time, he also worked on the fortifications of Suomenlinna. Wrede was made Knight of the Order of the Sword in 1750. In 1757, he was appointed Commander of the Fortifications to assist the elderly Gabriel Cronstedt.

=== Austrian service (1757–1758) ===
In 1757, Wrede entered Austrian military service during the Seven Years' War. He participated in the Siege of Prague, where he helped to update the city's fortifications. He served under Franz Leopold von Nádasdy at the Battle of Kuttenberg and fought under Count Leopold Joseph von Daun at the Battle of Kolín on 18 June 1757, after which the Austrian commander commended Wrede to the Swedish ambassador in Vienna. He served further with Nádasdy during operations in Silesia, including the siege and capture of Schweidnitz.

=== Later Swedish service (1758–1788) ===
When Sweden entered the Seven Years' War, Wrede was recalled to command defenses on the Swedish-Norwegian border at Bohuslän. Before being sent to serve in the Pomeranian War. In 1760, Wrede was recalled to Sweden to fulfill his duties as Fortifications Commander.

Wrede was offered the colonelcy of an infantry regiment by the Bourgeoisie Estate at the Riksdag of 1761. However, he declined the commission as he felt that an older applicant deserved the commission more. This act led to the Four Estate's unanimously agreeing that Wrede would be given the colonelcy of the next vacant regiment.

Subsequently, in 1762, Wrede was give colonelcy of the Skaraborg Regiment. In 1764, he was promoted to Major General and in 1770, he was made a Commander Grand Cross of the Order of the Sword. In 1772, Wrede was transferred from the Skaraborg Regiment to take command of the Uppland Regiment. In 1773, he was promoted to Lieutenant General and General in 1782, before resigning from his military command in 1788.

== Political career ==
Wrede partook very little in politics. He was a member of the Hats. In 1769, he was appointed to the Privy Council of Sweden (Riksrådet).

During the Riksdag of the Estates of 1789, King Gustav III sought to pass the Union and Security Act, which would strip the nobility of many of their privileges. The Act was also authoritarian as it increased the King's power and removed some checks and balances that had been in place since the Age of Liberty. Wrede aligned firmly in the opposition of the Act, and authored the draft that served as the House of Nobility's protest document. However, three of the four Estates accepted it, and it was passed into law.

== Invention, estates, and agriculture ==
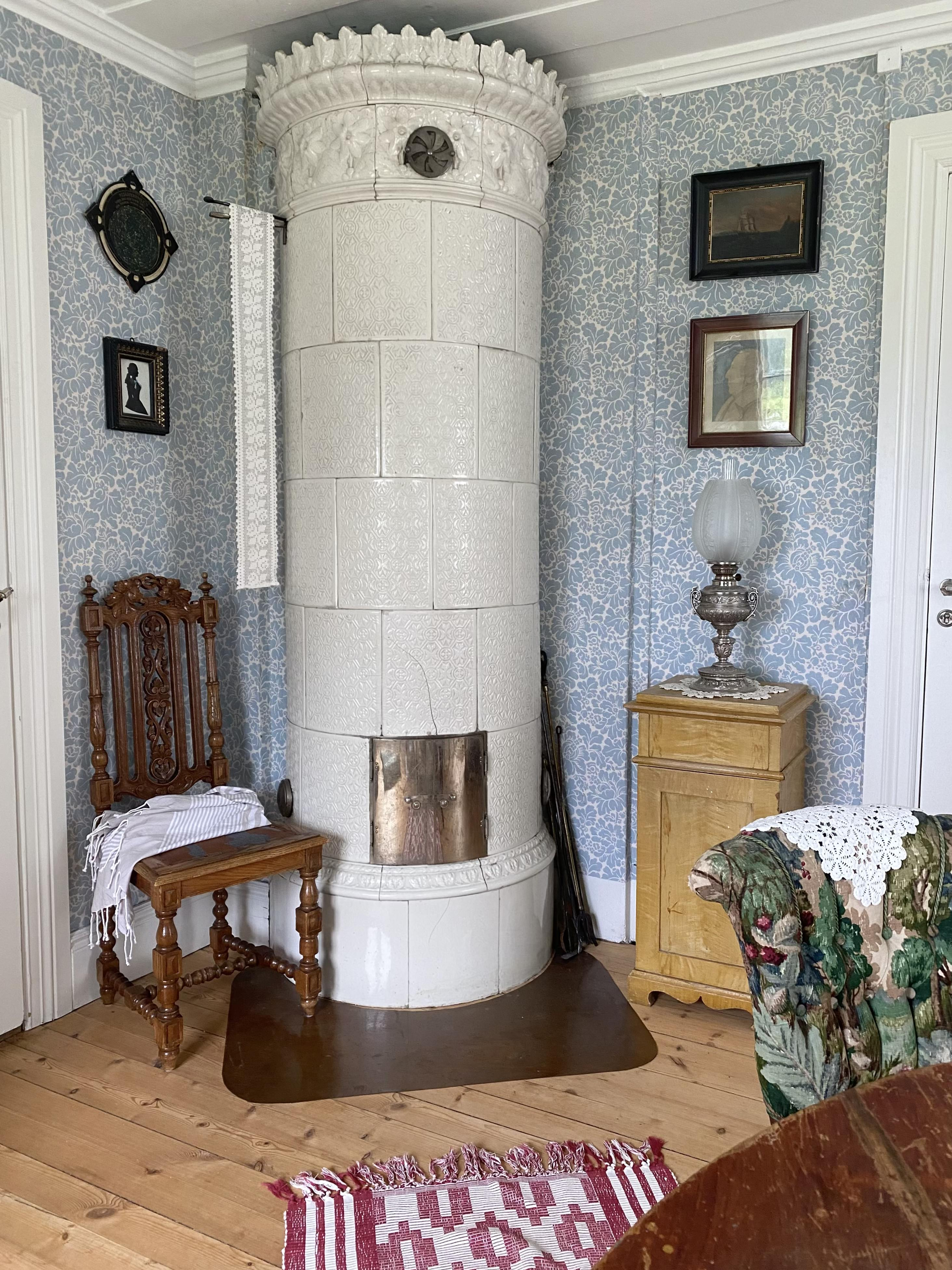
A Swedish tiled stove

In 1767, Wrede and Carl Johan Cronstedt invented the modern Swedish tiled stove (kakelugn). Their design included redesigned flues, so that heat would circulate around the stove instead of escaping through the chimney.

In the same year, Wrede sold his Finnish estates at Mustila, Peippola, and Moisio which he hand inherited from his father, to Jakob af Forselles. In Sweden, he resided in Penningby Castle and Sjöholm Manor.

Wrede made many agricultural improvements to his estate. He had marshes drained by ditch digging and burning the dried moss. The uncultivated land would then be plowed and the ash would be used as fertilizer. Over a period of fourteen years, grain production at Penningby increased from 400 to 1,000 barrels, and hay production rose from 400 to 720 loads. This feat would earn him the Order of Vasa in 1772. In 1786, he was elected to the Royal Swedish Academy of Sciences for his agricultural work and would later become its president in 1789. He was also a member of the Royal Patriotic Society.

== Personal life and death ==
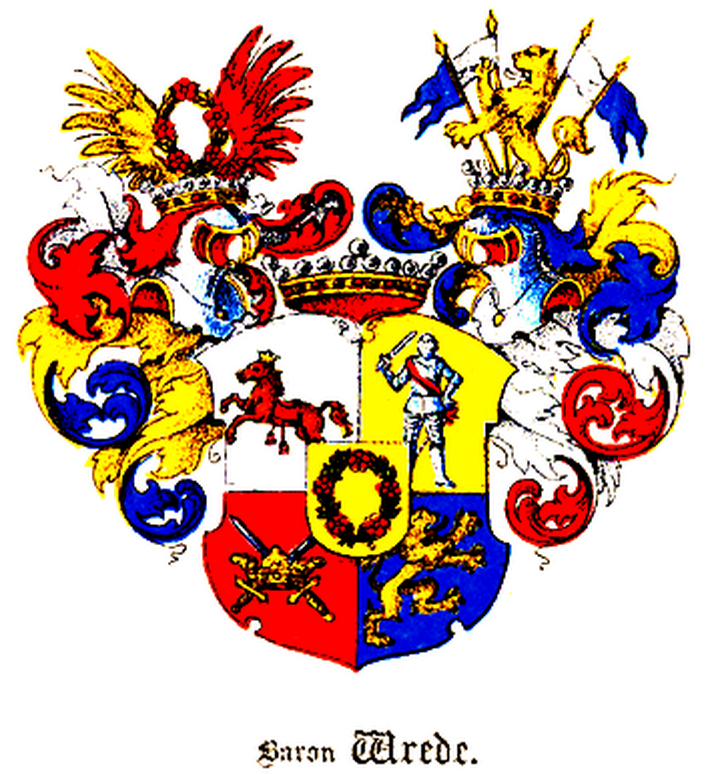
Wrede's coat of arms

Wrede married twice. In 1760 at Årsta, he married Baroness Catharina Charlotta Fleming af Liebelitz (1739 – 1764), daughter of Major General Baron Göran Fleming af Liebelitz. She was a member of the noble Fleming family. She died in childbirth at the Kungslena colonel's residence in Skaraborg.

In 1765, Wrede married his first wife's cousin, Baroness Ottiliana Charlotta Fleming af Liebelitz (1743 – 1811), daughter of Privy Councillor (Riksråd) Baron Otto Fleming af Liebelitz.

His children from his first marriage were:

- Fabian Wrede (1760 –1824), Field Marshal.
- Göran Casimir Wrede (1763 – 1782), twin; died unmarried on Isle de France (Mauritius) in French service.
- Sigrid Charlotta Wrede (1763 – 1828), twin; married Baron Fredrik Sparre.
- Henrik Wrede (1764 – 1782), died unmarried on Isle de France (Mauritius) in French service.

His children from his second marriage were:

- Otto Wrede (1765 – 1804), Major General and Colonel of Västerbotten Regiment; died unmarried.
- Casper Wrede (1768–1835), Lieutenant Colonel.
- Christina Charlotta Wrede (born 24 December 1769), died in infancy.
- Anna Christina Wrede (1775 – 1856), married her cousin, Baron Axel Herman Fleming af Liebelitz.
- Ottiliana Charlotta Wrede (1778 – 1811), married Baron Vilhelm Reinhold Leuhusen.
- Carl Henrik Wrede (1787–1858), Adjutant General and Colonel of the Kronoberg Regiment.

In his later years, Wrede became blind. He died on 27 August 1795 at Penningby Castle and was buried in the Sjöholm vault at Östra Vingåker Church.

== Orders and decorations ==
- (Sweden) Commander Grand Cross of the Royal Order of the Sword (1772)
- (Sweden) Knight of the Royal Order of the Sword (1750)
- (Sweden) Knight of the Royal Order of Vasa (1773)

== Works cited ==
- Elgenstierna, Gustaf (1936). "Friherrliga ätten Wrede af Elimä, nr 44 (Tab. 18)". Den introducerade svenska adelns ättartavlor (in Swedish). Vol. IX (Wrangel–Östner). Stockholm: P. A. Norstedt & Söners Förlag. p. 69.
- Palmblad, Vilhelm Fredrik (1855). "Wrede, Fabian Casimir". Biographiskt lexicon öfver namnkunnige svenska män (in Swedish). Vol. 22 (Wieselgren–Wrede). Uppsala: F. & G. Beijers förlag. pp. 300–303.
- "STF i Uplands Bergslag, av WS". Teknisk Tidskrift (in Swedish). 85. Norrköping: Svenska Teknologföreningen: 861. 18 October 1955 – via Project Runeberg.
- Westrin, Theodor, ed. (1921). "Wrede, 5. Fabian Kasimir". Nordisk familjebok (in Swedish). Vol. 32 (Werth–Väderkvarn) (2nd (Uggleupplagan) ed.). Stockholm: Nordisk familjeboks förlags aktiebolag. pp. 1049–1152.
- Dahl, Torsten, ed. (1955). "Wrede, Fabian Casimir". Svenska män och kvinnor: biografisk uppslagsbok (in Swedish). Vol. 8 (Toffteen–Ö). Stockholm: Albert Bonniers förlag. p. 439.
