= Mourn (disambiguation) =

To mourn is to express sorrow or grief.

Mourn may also refer to:

- Mourn (Assemblage 23 album), released in 2020
- Mourn (Corbin album), released in 2017

== See also ==
- Morn (disambiguation)
- Morne (disambiguation)
- Mourne (disambiguation)
- Mourning (disambiguation)
