= Montagnes du Cibao =

Mountain range in Haiti

Coordinates: 18°13′N 71°58′W

The Montagnes du Cibao (Mountains of Cibao) are located in Haiti. The highest point of the range, Morne du Cibao, is 2,280 meters (7,480 feet) above sea level, making it the third highest peak in Haiti, behind Pic la Selle and Pic Macaya.
