= Mourne =

Mourne may refer to:

== In Ireland ==
- Mourne Abbey, a small parish just south of Mallow, County Cork, Ireland
- Mourne (barony), in County Down, Northern Ireland
- Mourne Mountains, located in County Down in the south-east of Northern Ireland
  - Mourne Wall, built around the Mourne Mountains in Northern Ireland
- River Mourne, a river in County Tyrone, Northern Ireland
- Newry and Mourne District Council, in Northern Ireland
- Mourne (Northern Ireland Parliament constituency)

== Media ==
- The Mourne Observer, a newspaper in County Down, Northern Ireland

== Entertainment ==
- Mourne, a fictional member of the comedy group The Kransky Sisters
- "The Mountains of Mourne", an Irish folk song
- The Kingdom of Mourne, a fictional place in the 2011 American fantasy comedy film Your Highness

== See also ==
- Morn (disambiguation)
- Morne (disambiguation)
- Mourn (disambiguation)
- "The Moorlough Shore", a song also known as "The Maid of Mourne Shore"
