= Arvid Mörne =

Finnish author and poet

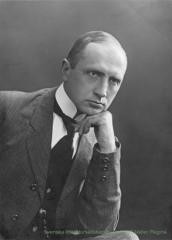
- Born: 6 May 1876; Kuopio, Finland
- Died: 15 June 1946 (aged 70); Kauniainen, Finland
- Occupations: poet, author, literary historian
- Spouse: Signe Hagelstam (m. 1899)
- Children: Håkan Mörne; Barbro Mörne; Gudrun Mörne

Arvid Mörne (6 May 1876 – 15 June 1946) was a Finland-Swedish author and poet. His nature poetry made the archipelago and coastal landscapes of Nyland the defining poetic landscape of Finland-Swedish literature. During the 1930s and 1940s he emerged as one of Scandinavia's foremost voices for democracy against the rising totalitarian movements in Europe, both as a poet and as a publicist. He was nominated for the Nobel Prize in Literature four times.

== Biography ==
Mörne was born in Kuopio to Arvid Oscar Mörne and Maria Gustava Lindroos. He graduated in 1894 and obtained a master's degree in literature and history at the University of Helsinki in 1897, and a PhD in 1910. He worked as a superintendent at the Nyland's folk high school Finns between 1899 and 1909, and as a teacher at the same school between 1909 and 1911. He was forced to leave this position after his involvement in the General Strike of 1905, where led a deputation that entered the house of Governor-General Obolensky, where the Senate was assembled, and demanded its resignation.

He became a docent of Finnish literature at the University of Helsinki in 1913, a position he held until 1943. He worked at the newspapers Nyländska posten (1900–1902) and Veckans Nyheter (1902–1904) and also at Arbetaren and Helsingforsposten. He was also a literature critic for the newspapers Dagens Press and Svenska Pressen.

Throughout his early career, Mörne was drawn to three political movements: the Sweden-Finnish national movement, the social democratic labour movement, and the activist resistance party. He never formally joined any of them, holding that his commitment to the Swedish-speaking minority's cause was incompatible with membership in a socialist party, and vice versa.

The violence in connection with the November strike of 1917 caused Mörne to distance himself from the revolutionaries and he took a stand for the white side when the Finnish Civil War broke out in 1918. At that time, he was no longer a member of the Finnish Social Democratic Party, but had almost become a social liberal. In the early 1930s, he publicly opposed the Lapua movement. During the Second World War, he made no secret of his strong aversion to Nazism and fascism. During this period, he emerged as one of the Nordic countries' foremost representatives of democratic contingency poetry against the totalitarian tendencies in Europe, and published articles on the oppression of linguistic and ethnic minorities in, among others, Dagens Press and Göteborgs Handels- och Sjöfartstidning.

His socialistic viewpoints would be reflected in his poetry, but he also felt strong for the weakest and for the Finnish archipelago nature. He also wrote the lyrics for the popular Swedish song "Båklandets vackra Maja" (with music composed by Hanna Hagbom).

He was married to the actress Signe Hagelstam and had three children. His works would eventually become more popular after his death in Kauniainen in 1946, and today he is considered one of the prime Finnish poets of the 20th century.

The Arvid Mörne competition in literature is named after him and given every year by Svenska Folkskolans Vänner.

In Kaivopuisto in Helsinki there is a sculpture of Arvid Mörne. The memorial was commissioned by Viktor Jansson and completed in 1951 to commemorate Mörne's 75th birthday.

== Prizes and awards ==
- De Nios stora pris 1931
- De Nios stora pris 1940

== Selected works ==
- Rytm och rim (lyric poetry) (1899)
- Nya sånger (lyric poetry) (1901)
- Bland bränningarna (play) (1903)
- Ny tid (lyric poetry) (1903)
- Josef Julius Wecksell. En studie (academic dissertation) (1909)
- Döda år (lyric poetry) (1910)
- Alexis Kivi och hans novel "Seitsemän veljestä" (history of literature) (1911)
- Skärgårdens vår (lyric poetry) (1913)
- Den svenska jorden. En nyländsk novell (short story) (1913)
- Ödemarksdramer I. Den helige Henricus (play) (1914)
- Från "Saima" till "Vikingen" (history) (1916)
- Sommarnatten (lyric poetry) (1916)
- Strandbyggaröden 1–3 (short stories) (1917)
- Den röde våren (novel) (1917)
- Fädernearvet (play) (1918)
- Offer och segrar från Finlands kampår (lyric poetry) (1918)
- Sverige och det svenska Finland (essay) (1918)
- Höstlig dikt (lyric poetry) (1919)
- Samlade dikter 1-8 (lyric poetry collections) (1919)
- Nya Wecksell-studier (history of literature) (1920)
- Solens återkomst (play) (1920)
- Inför havets anlete (novel) (1921)
- Kristina Bjur (novel) (1922)
- Klas-Kristians julnatt (short story) (1923)
- Vandringen och vägen (lyric poetry) (1924)
- Ett liv (novel) (1925)
- Dikter i urval (lyric poetry collection) (1926)
- Mörkret och lågan (lyric poetry) (1926)
- Axel Olof Freudenthal och den finlandssvenska nationalitetstanken (history) (1927)
- Morgonstjärnan (lyric poetry) (1928)
- Någon går förbi på vägen (short stories) (1928)
- Den förborgade källan (lyric poetry) (1930)
- Det ringer kväll (lyric poetry) (1931)
- Under vintergatan (lyric poetry) (1934)
- Hjärtat och svärdet (lyric poetry) (1935)
- Axel Olof Freudenthal. Liv och gärning (bibliography) (1936)
- Vandringsdagen. Lyrik i urval 1924-1935 (lyric poetry collection) (1936)
- Atlantisk bränning (lyric poetry) (1937)
- Lyriker och berättare. Finlandssvenska studier (literature history) (1939)
- Över havet brann Mars (lyric poetry) (1939)
- Sånger i världsskymning (lyric poetry) (1941)
- Det övergivna samvetet (collection of essays) (1943)
- Sfinxen och pyramiden (lyric poetry) (1944)
- Det förlorade landet och andra berättelser (short stories) (1945)
- Solbärgning (lyric poetry collection) (1946)
- Vårstorm. Lyrik i urval 1899-1919 (lyric poetry collection) (1947)
- Sista milen. Lyrik i urval 1937-1946 (lyric poetry collection) (1947)
