= Morne Criquet =

- Quartier
- The quartier of Morne Criquet marked 21.
- Coordinates: 17°54′24″N 62°49′44″W
- Country: France
- Overseas collectivity: Saint Barthélemy

Morne Criquet (French pronunciation: [mɔʁn kʁikɛ]) is a quartier of Saint Barthélemy in the Caribbean. It is located in the northern part of the island.
