= Josef Julius Wecksell =

Finnish poet and playwright

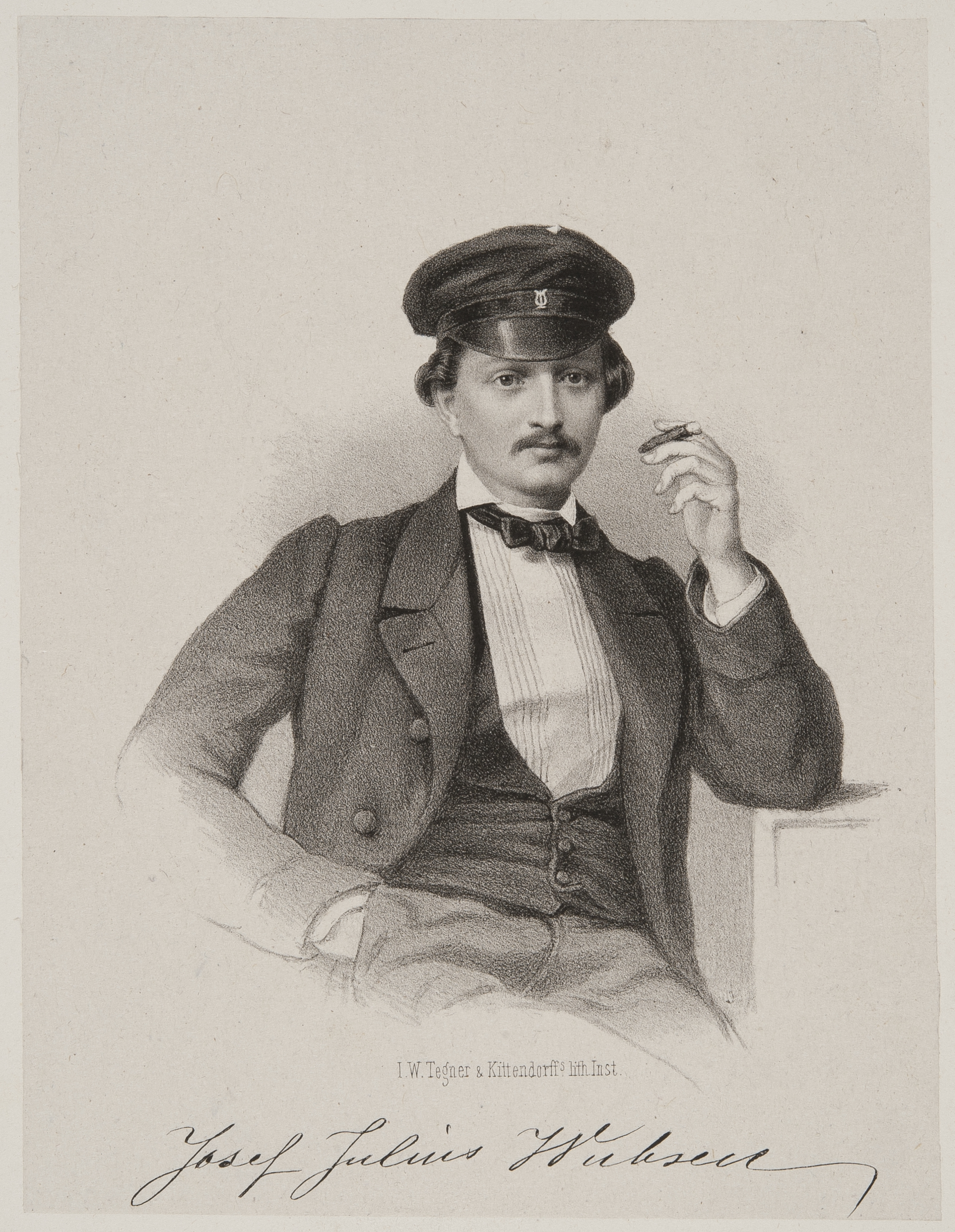
Josef Julius Wecksell as a student in the 1850s.

Josef Julius Wecksell (19 March 1838 – 9 August 1907) was a Finnish poet and playwright.

== Biography ==
Wecksell was born at Turku, Finland. He was the son of the hatter Johan Wecksell and Sofia Ulrika Björkelund. From 1858, he studied at the Imperial Alexander University.

He wrote a variety of poems, dramas and plays. In 1860 he published his first collection of poems. His historic drama Daniel Hjort was first performed in November 1862 at the Swedish Theatre (Nya Teatern) in Helsinki. It later formed the basis for the opera Daniel Hjort by composer Selim Palmgren (1878–1951) which was performed first time on April 21, 1910. His poems were later set to music by composer Jean Sibelius.

He also wrote the lyrics of the famous song Var det en dröm? of Jean Sibelius.

He suffered from severe melancholy from the early 1860s and was first committed to a private psychiatric hospital in Endenich near Cologne. In 1865, he entered Lappvik asylum (Lapinlahden sairaala) in the Lapinlahti suburb of Helsinki where he remained until his death.

In 1969, a statue of him was erected at the entrance to Åbo Akademi University.

== Works ==
- Valda ungdomsdikter, Frenckellska Boktryckeriet, 1860.
- Samlade dikter. K.E. Holm. 1891.
- Viisi runoa, pseudonym Irene Mendelin, Kansanvalistus-seura, 1894.
- Tre friare: Skämt i en akt med sång, Tryckeri- och tidnings, 1931.

=== Plays ===
- Daniel Hjort; reprint Love kirjat, 1981, ISBN 978-951-835-042-5
