= Morne de Dépoudré =

- Quartier
- The quartier of Morne de Dépoudré marked 22.
- Coordinates: 17°53′59″N 62°49′24″W
- Country: France
- Overseas collectivity: Saint Barthélemy

Morne de Dépoudré (French pronunciation: [mɔʁn də depudʁe]) is a quartier of Saint Barthélemy in the Caribbean. It is located in the very centre of the island.
