= Nordisk familjebok =

Swedish encyclopedia published between 1876 and 1957

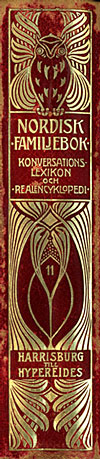
Spine for the owl edition

Nordisk familjebok (Swedish: [ˈnǔːɖɪsk faˈmɪ̂lːjɛˌbuːk], 'Nordic Family Book') is a Swedish encyclopedia that was published in print between 1876 and 1993, and that is now fully available in digital form via Project Runeberg at Linköping University. The public domain editions of the encyclopedia remain important reference works in Finland, especially on Finnish Wikipedia.

== History ==
=== First edition ===
First edition (1876–1899), featuring Idun logo

The Owl Edition (1904–1926), featuring its namesake as its logo

Nordisk familjebok began when Halmstad publisher Christian Gernandt hired an editor, linguist Nils Linder, in 1874 to publish a six-volume encyclopedia. Linder drew up a plan for the work, designed the editorial team and created a large circle of experts and literary figures, who submitted article proposals and wrote and reviewed them. Under Linder's direction, the articles were then edited to make them as formal, consistent and accurate as possible. Much attention was paid to Nordic subjects, mainly Swedish and Finnish, where sources and models were often lacking, so extensive and time-consuming pioneering work had to be done. As a result, the earlier plan for the scope and publication period of the work was soon abandoned.

The first edition of Nordisk familjebok was published in 20 volumes between 1876 and 1899, and is known as the "Idun edition" because it bears a picture of Idun, the Norse mythologic goddess of spring and rejuvenation, on its cover.

This was published over almost a quarter of a century, and particularly the first ten volumes contain material which is not seen in later editions. A good example of this is found in the end of the Berlin article (which is included in the second volume, from 1878), where the author finishes his article by talking about the public decency and morality, which he finds to be very poor. The author continues by complaining about there being a very lazy interest in religious matters and concludes: "to all these joint circumstances, one can hardly defend oneself against the thought of future threatening dangers".

Linder was editor until 1880, when he was succeeded by lexicographer John Rosén, first archivist at the National Archives Theodor Westrin, and B. F. Olsson.

=== Second edition ===
The second edition, popularly known as Uggleupplagan (lit. 'The Owl Edition') because of an owl image on its cover, was published between 1904 and 1926 in 38 volumes, and is the most comprehensive encyclopedia published in the Swedish language. A number of articles on Swedish Wikipedia, over 20,000, are based on this edition.

=== Third edition ===
The third edition had 17 volumes and was published between 1924 and 1937. Another three supplementary volumes were published in 1937, 1938 and in 1939. The supplement covers for instance the Spanish Civil War and a heavy update on Adolf Hitler, but nothing about Germany's war on Poland nor are later events mentioned. A second printing of the entire third edition was published between 1941 and 1944. Nothing essential is changed in the second printing, but quite a lot of one side portraits (still in black and white), coloured maps of "World cities", European countries, continents, Swedish provinces and cities are added together with a few topics, like a collection of national flags. All the added material are on unnumbered pages, presumably a technical printing solution (so already printed books did not require re-numbering). This edition is usually called "the 1930s edition" and are of brown color when looking at them on a shelf.

=== Fourth edition ===
In 1942, Svensk uppslagsbok AB (later Förlagshuset Norden AB), the same publishing house that published the competing Svensk uppslagsbok, took over the rights to Nordisk familjebok and published a fourth, highly concentrated edition in 22 volumes between 1951 and 1957.

=== Fifth edition ===
The fifth edition, Nordisk familijebook 1994, was published in 1993 by Corona in both a hardcopy, consisting of only two volumes, and a CD-ROM edition. According to the preface, it was based on the second edition of the larger work Lilla uppslagsboken.

Copyrights on the three first versions have expired, putting them in the public domain; while the fourth and fifth editions, from the 1950s and 1990s, respectively, are still under copyright.

== See also ==
- Nationalencyklopedin
- Nordisk familjeboks sportlexikon
