= The Tragedy of Mister Morn =

- First English edition
- Author: Vladimir Nabokov
- Translator: Anastasia Tolstoy; Thomas Karshan
- Language: Russian
- Genre: Play
- English publication date: 2012

The Tragedy of Mister Morn is a verse drama by Russian novelist Vladimir Nabokov. The play is one of his first major works.

The drama was written between 1923 and 1924, completed while Nabokov was living in Prague with his mother and sister as émigrés, having fled Russia because of the October Revolution in 1917. Nabokov had experienced a personal tragedy the previous year, when his father had been killed in Berlin while shielding fellow expatriate Pavel Milyukov from an assassination attempt. The play was posthumously published in the Russian literary magazine Zvezda, and was first published in English by Penguin Classics in 2012. The Zvezda version of the play, compared with the manuscript given to the Library of Congress by Nabokov in the 1950s, is known to be rife with errors.

The story is set in the future, in an unnamed European country. The protagonist of the drama is Morn, a masked king, whose ascent to the throne has brought peace and stability to the country. He falls in love with Midia, the wife of the revolutionary Ganus. Ganus returns to the capital city after escaping from a labour camp. Learning of his wife's affair with Morn, he challenges Morn to a duel. Morn loses the duel, settled with playing cards, and is obliged to kill himself. He refuses, and runs off with Midia, while the revolutionaries overthrow the government in his absence, replacing the benign monarchy with a dictatorship.

Brian Boyd, in his biography Vladimir Nabokov: The Russian Years, writes that, unlike Nabokov's prior four plays, which were influenced by Alexander Pushkin, the style and atmosphere of Morn "unmistakably aims at Shakespeare." In the tragedy, Siggy Frank, author of Nabokov's Theatrical Imagination, suggests that the king's role as ruler of a kingdom is a symbol of the poet's role as an artistic creator.
