= Fabian Wrede-class training ship =

Class of three training ships

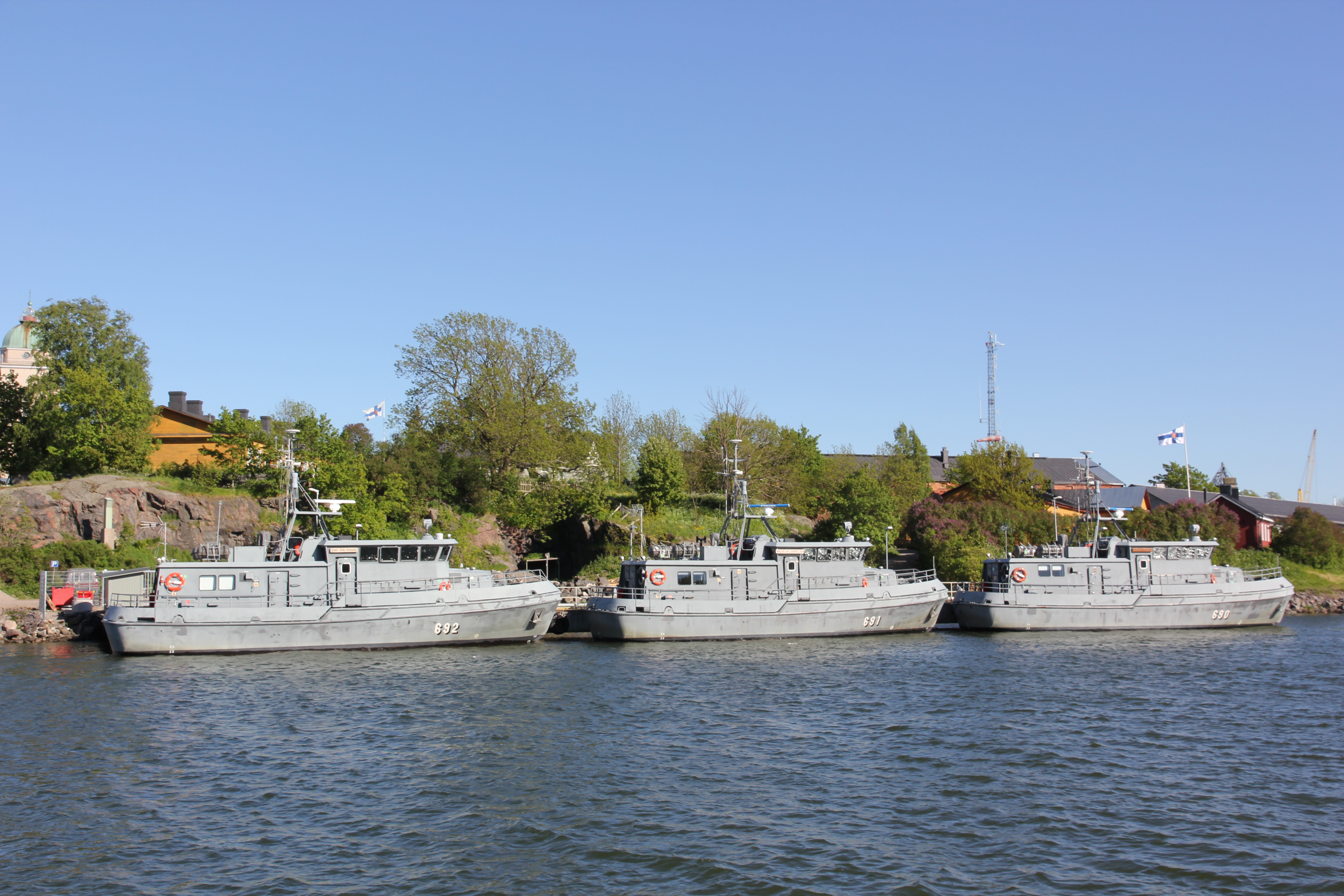
- Fabian Wrede class at Suomenlinna

Class overview
- Builders: Uudenkaupungin työvene
- Operators: Finnish Navy
- Preceded by: Heikki class training ship
- In commission: 2006-
- Completed: 3
- Active: 3

General characteristics
- Type: Training ship
- Displacement: 65 t (65 t)
- Length: 19.6 m (64 ft)
- Beam: 5.8 m (19 ft)
- Draft: 1.9 m (6.2 ft)
- Propulsion: 1 screw 500 kW /2200 RPM CAT C 18 engine
- Speed: 10 knots (19 km/h)
- Complement: 10+2

Fabian Wrede class consists of three training ships used by Finnish Navy. The ships are used by the Naval academy of Finland for basic seamanship training, with particular emphasis on navigation in coastal and archipelago waters. The vessels in the class are Fabian Wrede, Wilhelm Carpelan and Axel von Fersen. All ships were built by Uudenkaupungin työvene Oy and commissioned between 2006 and 2008. The ships will replace the old Heikki class training ships.

== Design ==
Fabian Wrede class ships are built with steel hull and aluminium superstructure. One 500 kW CAT C 18 engine driving a single screw provides the propulsion for the vessels, with a bow thruster provided for increased maneuverability. An auxiliary 38 kVA diesel generator is also carried. The ships are manned with a maximum of eight seaman students and four instructors and crew members. Intended as purpose-built training ships, the internal layout and equipment of the bridge is designed similar to larger warships. The engine room is built spacious enough for several students and the mess can be converted to a class room.

== Ships ==
Fabian Wrede class ships are named after nobles and officers from the period of Swedish rule in Finland. The names have been previously carried by Von Fersen class liaison ships. The lead ship Fabian Wrede, pennant number 690, is named after Fabian Casimir Wrede and was commissioned on 15 August 2006. Wilhelm Carpelan (691), the namesake of Wilhelm Carpelan was commissioned on 14 June 2007. The last ship in the class, Axel von Fersen (692) was commissioned on 30 June 2008, and is named after Axel von Fersen the Elder.
