= Theodor Westrin =

Swedish archivist and editor of Nordisk familjebok (1850–1928)

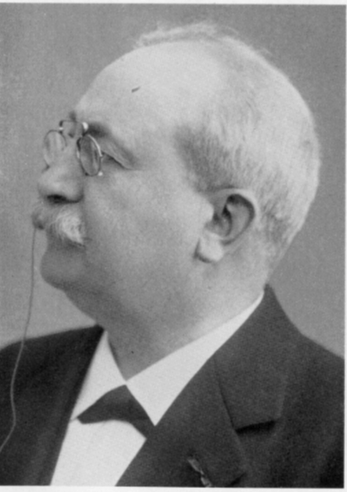
- Westrin in 1920.
- Born: Johan Theodor Westrin; 12 January 1850; Hedvig Eleonora Parish, Sweden
- Died: 10 October 1928 (aged 78); Klara Parish, Sweden
- Spouse: Sigrid Maria Fransiska Silfverswärd (m. 1882)

Academic background
- Education: Uppsala University (PhD)
- Thesis: Om 1688 års engelska revolution (1875)

Johan Theodor Westrin (12 January 1850 – 10 October 1928) was a Swedish archivist and editor of Nordisk familjebok.

== Biography ==
Theodor Westrin was born on 12 January 1850 in Stockholm. In 1869, he began studying at Uppsala University. After graduating with a PhD degree in 1875, he worked as an administrative assistant at the Swedish National Archives, where he in 1897 would be promoted to archivist.

He was co-editor of the first edition of Nordisk familjebok and sole editor of its supplement between 1880–1894 and 1895–1899 respectively. Since 1906, he was chief editor of the second edition (popularly known as Uggleupplagan, lit. 'the owl edition'). He was appointed 129th member of the Royal Swedish Academy of Letters on 5 November 1901.

He married Sigrid Maria Fransiska Silfverswärd.
