= Morne du Cibao =

Mountain in Haiti

- Location within Haiti

Highest point
- Elevation: 2,280 m (7,480 ft)
- Coordinates: 18°21′25″N 72°15′32″W

Geography
- Location: Haiti

Morne du Cibao is the third highest mountain in Haiti, after Pic la Selle and Pic Macaya. It is the highest point in the Montagnes du Cibao, and rises to an elevation of 2,280 metres (7,480 ft) above sea level.

The name Cibao used in this article is likely a historical cartographic mistake, as this name is not used locally (although it is the name of a region in the neighboring Dominican Republic). This mountain is locally known, in Haitian Kreyòl as Tèt Kabayo. The name Kabayo likely derives from the Spanish Caballo, meaning horse. To the west is Pik Lavizit and to the east Tèt Opak, high points on the same Massif de La Selle escarpment which are only slightly lower in elevation.
