= Skaraborg Regiment (infantry) =

Coordinates: 58°22′46″N 13°50′43″E

- Skaraborgs regemente
- Active: 1624–1709, 1709–1942
- Country: Sweden
- Allegiance: Swedish Armed Forces
- Branch: Swedish Army
- Type: Infantry
- Size: Regiment
- Part of: 3rd Military District (1833–1893); 3rd Army Division (1893–1901); III Army Division (1902–1927); Western Army Division (1928–1936); III Army Division (1937–1942)
- Garrison/HQ: Skövde
- Motto: "Arvet förpliktar" ("The heritage obligates")
- Colours: Black and yellow
- March: "Geschwindmarsch" (Herrman) (Note: The march was adopted in the 19th century, established in 1953 by Army Order 33/1953. The march was used by the Skaraborg Brigade the years 1994–2000, and since 2000 by Skaraborg Group (Skaraborgsgruppen).)
- Battle honours: Varberg (1565), Narva (1581), Lützen (1632), Leipzig (1642), Warsaw (1656), Lund (1676), Landskrona (1677), Malatitze (1708)

Insignia
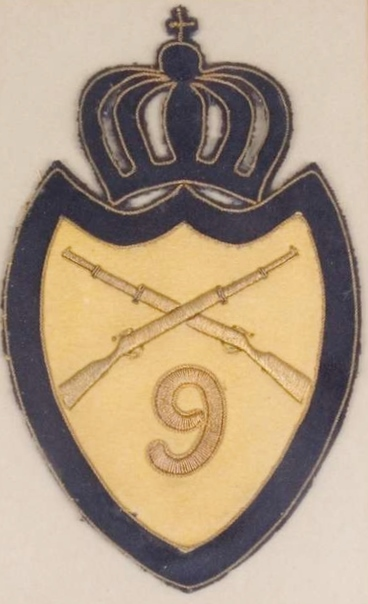
- Shoulder sleeve insignia m/1906

The Skaraborg Regiment (Swedish: Skaraborgs regemente), designation I 9, was a Swedish Army infantry regiment that traced its origins back to the 16th century. It was converted to an armoured regiment in 1942. The regiment's soldiers were recruited from Skaraborg County, and it was later garrisoned there.

== History ==
The regiment has its origins in fänikor raised in Skaraborg County in the 16th century. The oldest preserved documents dealing with fänikor and foot soldiers in Skaraborg County are from 1543. Of the fänikor from Västergötland and Dalsland, in 1613 a grand regiment of 3,000 men was formed. Sometime between 1621 and 1624, the grand regiment was permanently split into three smaller field regiments which formed the basis for Skaraborg Regiment, Älvsborg Regiment and Halland Regiment. Skaraborg Regiment got Bengt Pilefeldt as its first commander. The regiment was mentioned in the Instrument of Government of 1634 as Det Andre Wästgöthe Regemente, där under hörer Scharaborgz Lähn ("The second Västgöta regiment, which includes Skaraborg County"). The regiment was allotted in 1684. It was roterat (an old feudal method of recruiting) with 1,200 numbers (soldiers) in Skaraborg County. From 1696 to 1913 the regiment trained on Axevalla heath. In 1913, it moved to new barracks in Skövde. The regiment received an armored battalion in 1939 and was reorganized in 1942 into an armored regiment, giving it the name Skaraborg Armoured Regiment (P 4).

== Organisation ==
1684(?)

- Livkompaniet
- Överstelöjtnantens kompani
- Majorens kompani
- Vartofta kompani
- Skåninge kompani
- Kåkinds kompani
- Willska kompani
- Norra Wassbo kompani

1854(?)

- Livkompaniet
- Höjentorps kompani
- Vartofta kompani
- Vilska kompani
- Södra Vadsbo kompani
- Norra Vadsbo kompani
- Kåkinds kompani
- Skånings kompani

== Heraldry and traditions ==
=== Colours, standards and guidons ===
When the regiment was reorganized into an armoured unit, the colour from the time as an infantry unit was kept. The colour was of the 1844 model, and had been presented on 24 June 1858 by Crown Prince Carl Ludvig Eugen (later Charles XV), then in the form of two battalion colours. The colour originally had only two battle honours, Lützen (1632) and Malatitze (1708). After further investigations, the regiment was admitted in 1929 on the colour of the 2nd Battalion add six battle honours; Varberg (1565), Narva (1581), Leipzig (1642), Warsaw (1656), Lund (1676) and Landskrona (1677). Until 1994, the regimental colour was the oldest in use when it was replaced by a new colour.

=== Medals ===
In 1942, the Kungl. Skaraborgs regementes (P 4) förtjänstmedalj ("Royal Skaraborg Regiment Medal of Merit") in gold (SkarabregGM) was established.

== Commanding officers ==
Regimental commanders active at the regiment during the years 1634–1709 and 1709–1942. For regimental commanders after 1942, see Skaraborg Regiment (armoured).

- 1634–1638: Bengt Persson Pilefelt (1631)
- 1639–1648: Peder Lindormsson Ribbing af Zernava
- 1648–1656: Johan Nern
- 1656–1665: Johan Hård af Segerstad
- 1665–1679: Henrik Fredrik von Börstell
- 1679–1688: Gustaf Hård af Segerstad
- 1688–1705: Nils Brattman Stromberg
- 1706–1709: Casper Otto Sperling
- 1709–1709: Carl Gustaf Ulfsparre af Broxvik †
- 1709–1717: Georg Witting
- 1717–1720: Sven Lagerberg
- 1720–1729: Hans Henrik von Essen
- 1729–1737: Gustaf Gadde
- 1737–1738: Hans Georg Mörner af Morlanda
- 1739–1743: Carl Henrik Wrangel
- 1744–1748: Anton Adolf af Wasaborg
- 1748–1748: Fredrik Henrik Sparre
- 1748–1750: Carl Magnus de Laval
- 1750–1762: Carl von Otter
- 1762–1772: Fabian Casimir Wrede
- 1772–1790: Pehr Scheffer
- 1791–1796: Wilhelm Mauritz Pauli
- 1796–1808: Carl Johan Gyllenhaal
- 1808–1809: Carl Mörner af Tuna
- 1809–1816: Carl Henrik Posse af Säby
- 1816–1836: Christer Posse af Säby
- 1837–1844: Magnus von Rosen
- 1845–1858: Sebastian Carl von Knorring
- 1858–1864: Adolf Ludvig de Maré
- 1864–1879: Alexander Johan Wästfelt
- 1879–1882: Axel Ryding
- 1882–1885: Gustaf Fredrik Snoilsky
- 1885–1893: Oscar Theodor Fåhraeus
- 1893–1898: Gustaf d´Albedyhll
- 1898–1906: Oscar Alfred Wäsfelt
- 1906–1909: Carl Axel Örn
- 1909–1916: Axel Carleson
- 1916–1919: Daniel Magnus Fredrik Björkman
- 1919–1922: Tell Schmidt
- 1922–1931: Pontus Reuterswärd
- 1931–1935: Carl Uggla
- 1935–1942: Arthur Nordensvan

== Names, designations and locations ==
Name	Translation	From		To
Kungl. Skaraborgs regemente	Royal Skaraborg Regiment	1624-03-10	–	1709-07-01
Kungl. Skaraborgs regemente	Royal Skaraborg Regiment	1709-??-??	–	1942-09-30
Designation		From		To
№ 9		1816-10-01	–	1914-09-30
I 9		1914-10-01	–	1942-09-30
Location		From		To
Skövde Garrison		1914-01-01	–	1942-09-30

== See also ==
- Skaraborg Regiment
- List of Swedish infantry regiments
