= Bra böckers lexikon =

Swedish encyclopedia published 1973–1996

Bra böckers lexikon (BBL) is a Swedish encyclopedia that was published between 1973 and 1996, in four editions with 25 volumes each. The first three editions sold more than 400,000 copies. The first edition was published between 1973 and 1981, the second 1974–82, the third 1983-90 and the fourth 1991–96. Between 1995 and 1999, a special edition, Bra böckers lexikon 2000, was also published.
