= Hayden Virtue =

Australian canoe sailor

Hayden Virtue is an Australian canoe sailor.

Virtue became the 2008 World Champion in the international canoes event by finishing in front of American Bill Beaver and fellow Australian Seth Dunbar. Together with Dunbar and Tim Wilson he also won the International Canoe Challenge Cup by successfully challenging the current holders Great Britain, represented by Colin Brown, John Robson and Simon Allen.
