= Seth Dunbar =

Australian canoe sailor

Seth Dunbar is an Australian canoe sailor.

Dunbar came third at the 2008 Canoe Sailing World Championships in the international canoes event by finishing behind American Bill Beaver and fellow Australian Hayden Virtue who was crowned as the new World Champion. Together with Virtue and Tim Wilson he also won the International Canoe Challenge Cup by successfully challenging the current holders Great Britain, represented by Colin Brown, John Robson and Simon Allen.

== Career highlights ==
2008
Port Phillip Bay, (bronze) 3rd, World Championships Canoe Sailing, International Canoe
Port Phillip Bay, winner, International Canoe Challenge Cup
