= Tim Wilson (canoeist) =

Australian canoe sailor

Tim Wilson is an Australian canoe sailor.

Wilson was part of the Australian team (together with Hayden Virtue and Seth Dunbar) that won the 2008 International Canoe Challenge Cup by successfully challenging the current holders Great Britain, represented by Colin Brown, John Robson and Simon Allen.

== Career highlights ==
2008
Port Phillip, winner, International Canoe Challenge Cup
