= Alarik Helleday =

Swedish colonial civil servant (1842–1896)

Governor of Saint Barthélemy
- In office June 1874 – 5 November 1875
- Monarch: Oscar II
- Preceded by: Bror Ludvig Ulrich
- Succeeded by: Bror Ludvig Ulrich

Personal details
- Born: 3 March 1842 Umeå, Sweden
- Died: 1 March 1896 (aged 53) Stockholm, Sweden

Frans Alarik Helleday (March 3, 1842 – March 1, 1896) was a Swedish colonial civil servant, who served as acting governor over Saint Barthélemy from 1874 to 1875, the only Swedish colony in the West Indies at the time.

== Biography ==
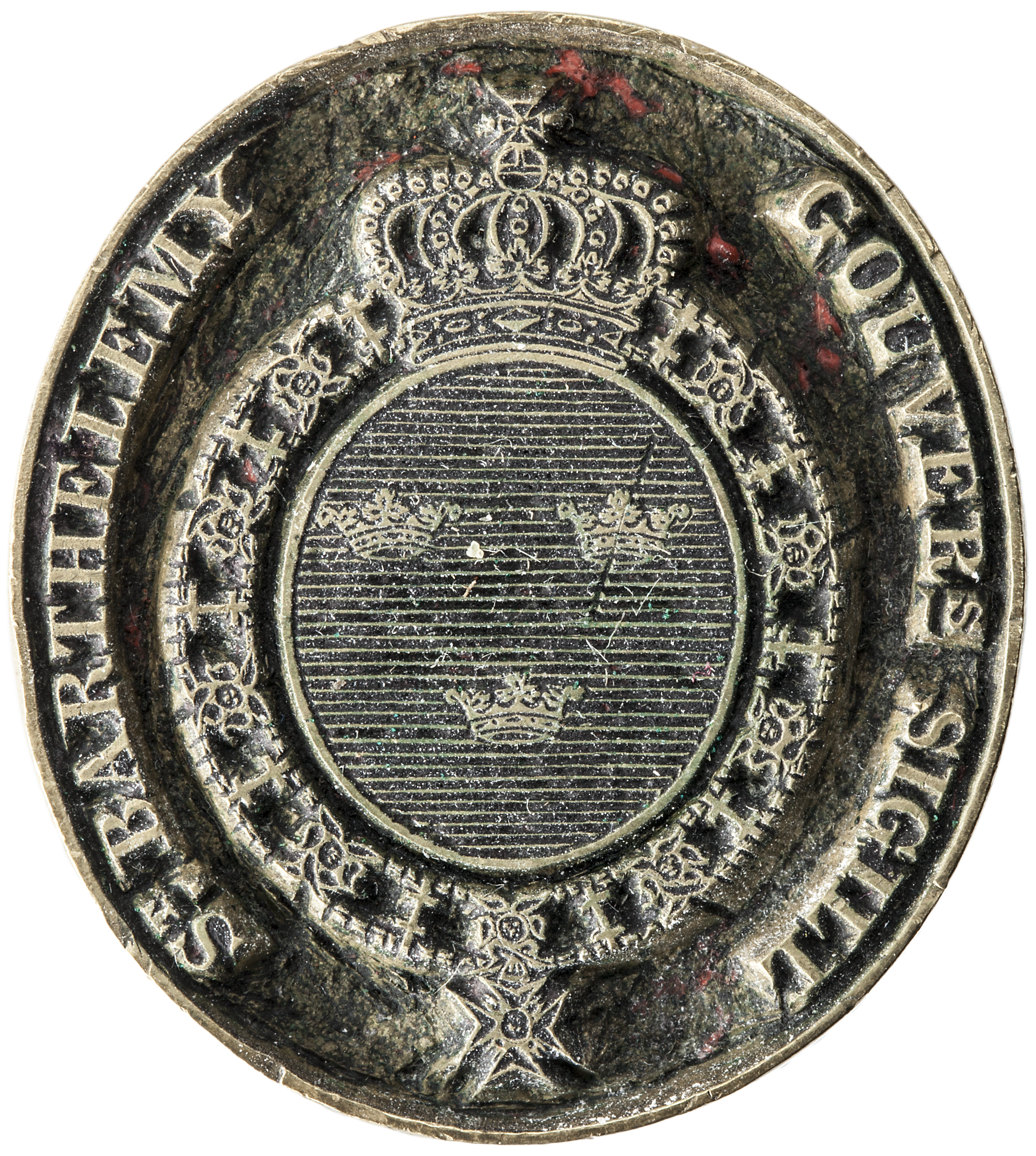
Seal of the Swedish governor of Saint Barthélemy, 1784–1878.

Helleday was born in Erlandstorp, Umeå, to the district judge Johan David Helleday and his wife Euphrosyne (née Åman). He studied law at Uppsala University. After completing his studies, he obtained the position of vice district judge and later worked at the Svea Court of Appeal. In 1873, he married his cousin Hermina Florentina, who accompanied him to Saint Barthélemy the same year and later bore him a son and a daughter. Upon his arrival on the island, Helleday was appointed government secretary and customs controller in Gustavia.

Helleday was named governor in 1874, a position he held until the return of his predecessor Ulrich in late 1875. During his tenure as governor, efforts were made to investigate the possibility of lead mining on the island after some deposits were discovered in Lorient in order to save the colony from its financial situation, and a company for that purpose was founded in 1875. However, any hopes of commercial gain were soon dashed, as no viable lead deposits were found. Helleday also made an extensive review of the education system on the island. At that time the Swedish government had begun looking for a foreign power to sell the colony to after decades of financial deficits, and the colony was returned to France in 1878, following a referendum the previous year. Helleday, who had remained on the island with his family, embarked for Sweden along with other Swedish officials on the steam frigate HSwMS Vanadis on 20 March 1878.

Upon his return to Sweden, he became a notary and ombudsman at Generalpoststyrelsen and settled down in Stockholm. He continued to receive a pension from French government until his death in 1896. He was buried at Adelsö Church.

Political offices
Preceded by Bror Ludvig Ulrich	Governor of Saint Barthélemy; 1874–1875	Succeeded by Bror Ludvig Ulrich
