= 1873 Dominican Republic Samaná Peninsula referendum =

Referendum in the Dominican Republic

- February 19, 1873

Results
Choice	Votes	%
For	20,496	99.91%
Against	19	0.09%
Total votes	20,515	100.00%

A referendum on leasing the Samaná Peninsula to the United States for 99 years was held in the Dominican Republic on 19 February 1873. The proposal was approved by 99.91% of voters, but was never implemented after President Buenaventura Báez was overthrown on 2 January 1874.

== Background ==
The Dominican Republic originally became independent from Haiti in 1844. However, in 1861 the country was occupied by Spain following an inflation crisis. In 1865 the country became independent again following the Restoration War. By 1870 the country had significant debts caused by the ongoing civil war. President Báez planned on selling the Samaná Peninsula to the United States for $1.1 million, whilst US President Ulysses S. Grant wanted to annex the entire country. A treaty was signed between the two countries on 29 November 1869. The US would purchase the Dominican Republic for $1.5 million and would lease the Samaná Peninsula for $147,229.91 for 99 years. Although the proposal was approved in the 1870 referendum, the United States Senate rejected the annexation on 30 June 1870 with a 28–28 vote.

However, Báez still required the money, and wanted to continue with the Samaná Peninsula leasing deal on the same terms. The Senate of the Dominican Republic agreed to the proposal on 28 December 1872. The plebiscite was later carried out in the form of a register, in which invalid or blank voters were not possible.

== Results ==
Choice	Votes	%
For	20,496	99.91
Against	19	0.09
Total	20,515	100.00
Source: Direct Democracy

== See also ==
- Proposed United States annexation of Santo Domingo
- Samaná English
- Cuban–American Treaty of Relations (1903)
