= James Haarlef Haasum =

Swedish colonial administrator (1791–1871)

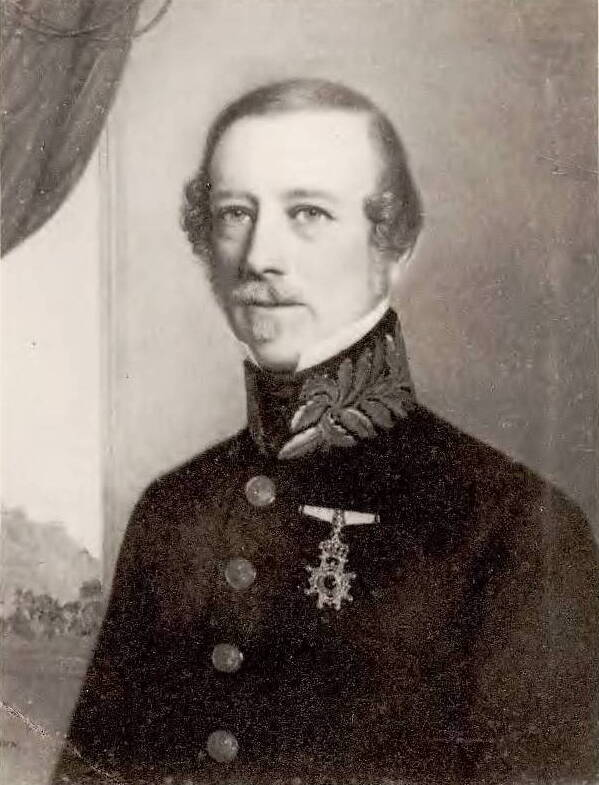
- Portrait c. 1833

Governor of Saint Barthélemy
- In office May 1826 – August 1858
- Monarchs: Charles XIV John; Oscar I
- Preceded by: Johan Norderling
- Succeeded by: Fredrik Carl Ulrich

Personal details
- Born: 2 January 1791 Gustavia, Swedish Saint Barthélemy
- Died: 12 June 1871 (aged 80) Stockholm, Sweden
- Awards: Order of the Polar Star

James Haarlef Haasum (January 2, 1791 – June 18, 1871) was a Swedish colonial administrator, who served as governor over Saint Barthélemy from 1826 to 1858, the only Swedish colony in the West Indies at the time.

== Biography ==
Born to Lauritz Haarlef Haasum and Johanna Maria (née van Beverhoudt) in Gustavia, he was of Danish and Dutch descent. His parents had moved to Saint Barthélemy from Sint Eustatius in 1788. Haasum received his education at Uppsala University and underwent military training in Sweden.

He returned to Saint Barthélemy in 1814, initially working as a translator for English and French, as well as serving as vice conseil notaire for the authorities in Gustavia. Haasum was eventually appointed aide-de-camp to Governor Berndt Robert Gustaf Stackelberg and was made sub-lieutenant in the island’s garrison. The Swedish garrison was in desperate need of manpower, and at times, the defense of the island had to rely on a local militia. In February 1819, Haasum travelled to Sweden and served with the Dalarna Regiment but returned to Saint Barthélemy in September the same year, along with new recruits for the garrison. However, the defense of the island continued to deteriorate despite repeated pleas from colonial authorities to Stockholm for more troops. Smaller reinforcements arrived at irregular intervals, which proved unsustainable, and by 1826, only one soldier remained at Fort Gustav.

Haasum was made governor in 1826, a position he intermittently shared with his brother-in-law Lars Gustaf Morsing until 1833. As governor, Haasum opposed slavery and the Atlantic slave trade, issuing several decrees during his tenure to restrict the local slave trade. Prior to the debate on the abolition of slavery in the Riksdag of 1844–45, Haasum was tasked with preparing a report on the status of slavery on the island and providing recommendations for its abolition. In 1847, following the royal proclamation Proclamation de l'abolition de l'esclavage à Saint-Barthélemy, he oversaw the abolition of slavery on the island.

During a leave of absence in Sweden, Haasum was dismissed from his position as governor due to ill health. He never returned to Saint Barthélemy and instead settled in Stockholm.

Haasum was married three times and had six children. He was a recipient of the Order of the Polar Star.

Political offices
Preceded by Johan Norderling	Governor of Saint Barthélemy; 1826–1858	Succeeded by Fredrik Carl Ulrich
