= Carl Berghult =

Carl Berghult may refer to:

- Carl Rudolf Berghult (1905–2000), American politician, mayor of Duluth, Minnesota
- Carl Fredrik Berghult (1794–1834), Swedish military officer and colonial administrator
