= Carl Smith (canoeing) =

Swedish officer and canoeist (1843–1928)

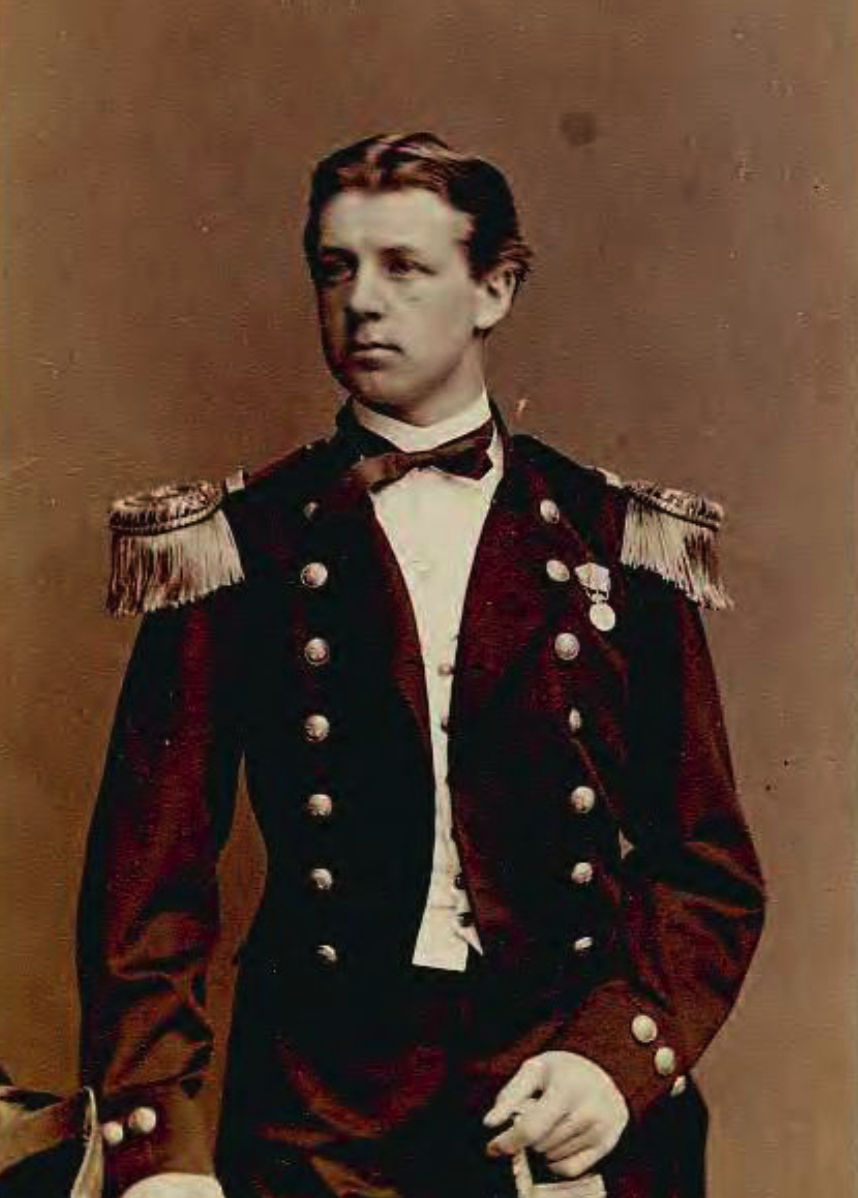
Carl Smith, photo from 1870

Carl Edvard Smith (12 July 1843 – 25 July 1928) was a Swedish naval officer and early promoter of canoeing. As a naval officer, he had a successful career, reaching the rank of kommendörkapten (commander) and becoming a member of the Royal Swedish Academy of War Sciences and the Royal Swedish Society of Naval Sciences. For eight years he was the head of the permanent naval mine defences of Sweden. In addition to his military career, Smith was instrumental in introducing canoeing as a sport to Sweden. After an encounter with a canoe on Malta in 1871 which sparked his enthusiasm, he took to propagating canoeing through articles and books, and through designing and building canoes himself. He has been called the "father of Swedish canoe sporting".

== Biographical background and naval career ==
Carl Smith was born in Karlskrona in 1843. He pursued a naval career, and became a sekundlöjtnant (a subaltern rank) in 1864. In 1870, he was promoted to löjtnant (sub-lieutenant), and in 1881 to captain. In 1890, he was elevated to kommendörkapten (commander) and at the same time made head of the department of the Swedish Navy responsible for the permanent mine defences of the country (fasta minförsvaret). He would retain the position until 1898, and resigned from active duty one year later. He was a member of the Royal Swedish Academy of War Sciences and the Royal Swedish Society of Naval Sciences. He died on 25 July 1928.

== Introduction of canoe sporting to Sweden ==
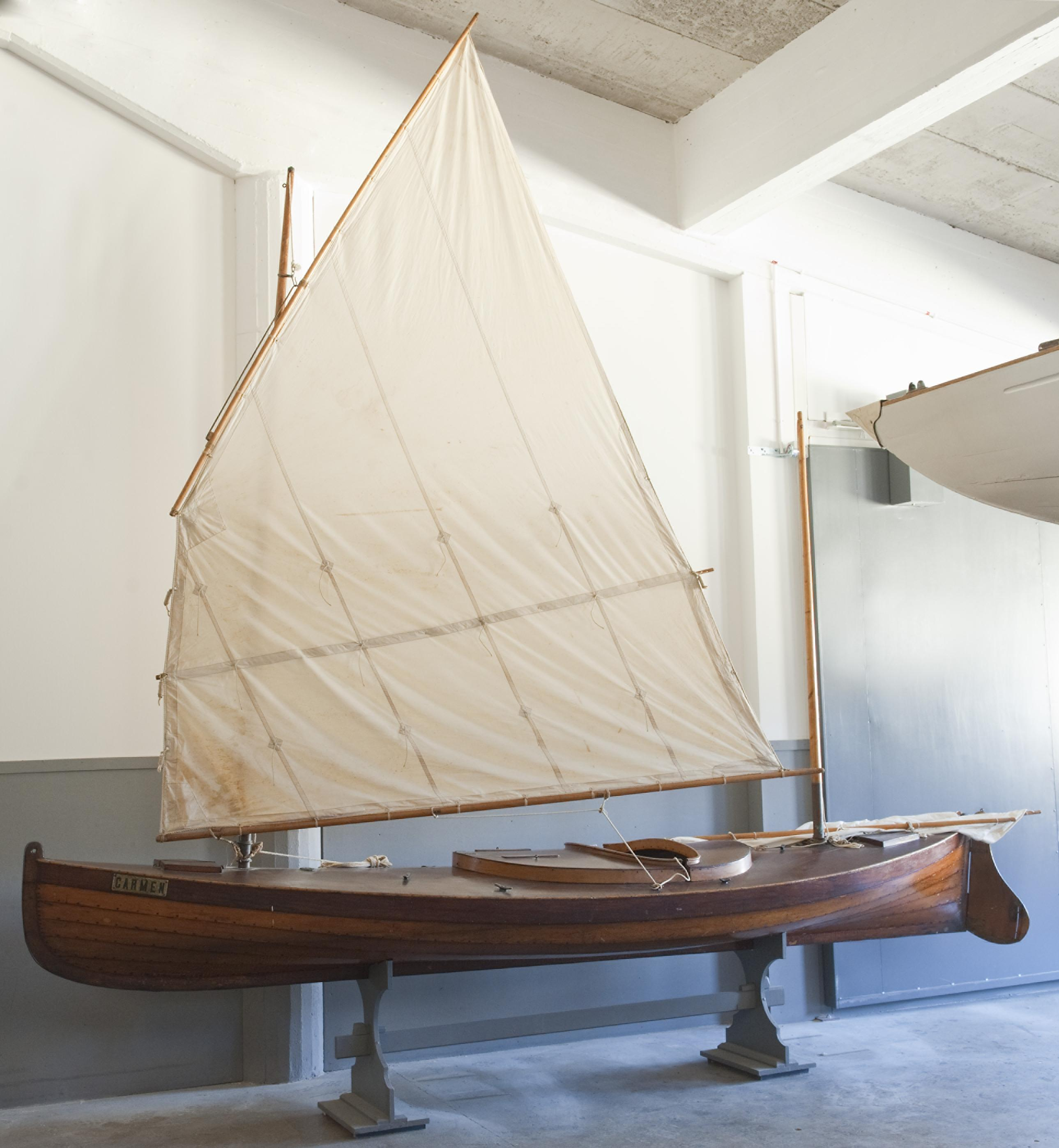
Carmen, a canoe designed by Smith in 1882 and brought on the Vanadis circumnavigation of Earth in 1883–1885.

In addition to his military career, Smith was instrumental in introducing canoeing to Sweden as a sport. He is referred to as the "father of Swedish canoe sporting" by the Swedish Canoe Federation. Already in his early youth, Smith took a keen interest in boat and ship construction. While he was posted on board the Swedish steam corvette Gefle during a voyage to the Mediterranean Sea in 1871, he encountered a canoe on Malta, an encounter which sparked his enthusiasm.

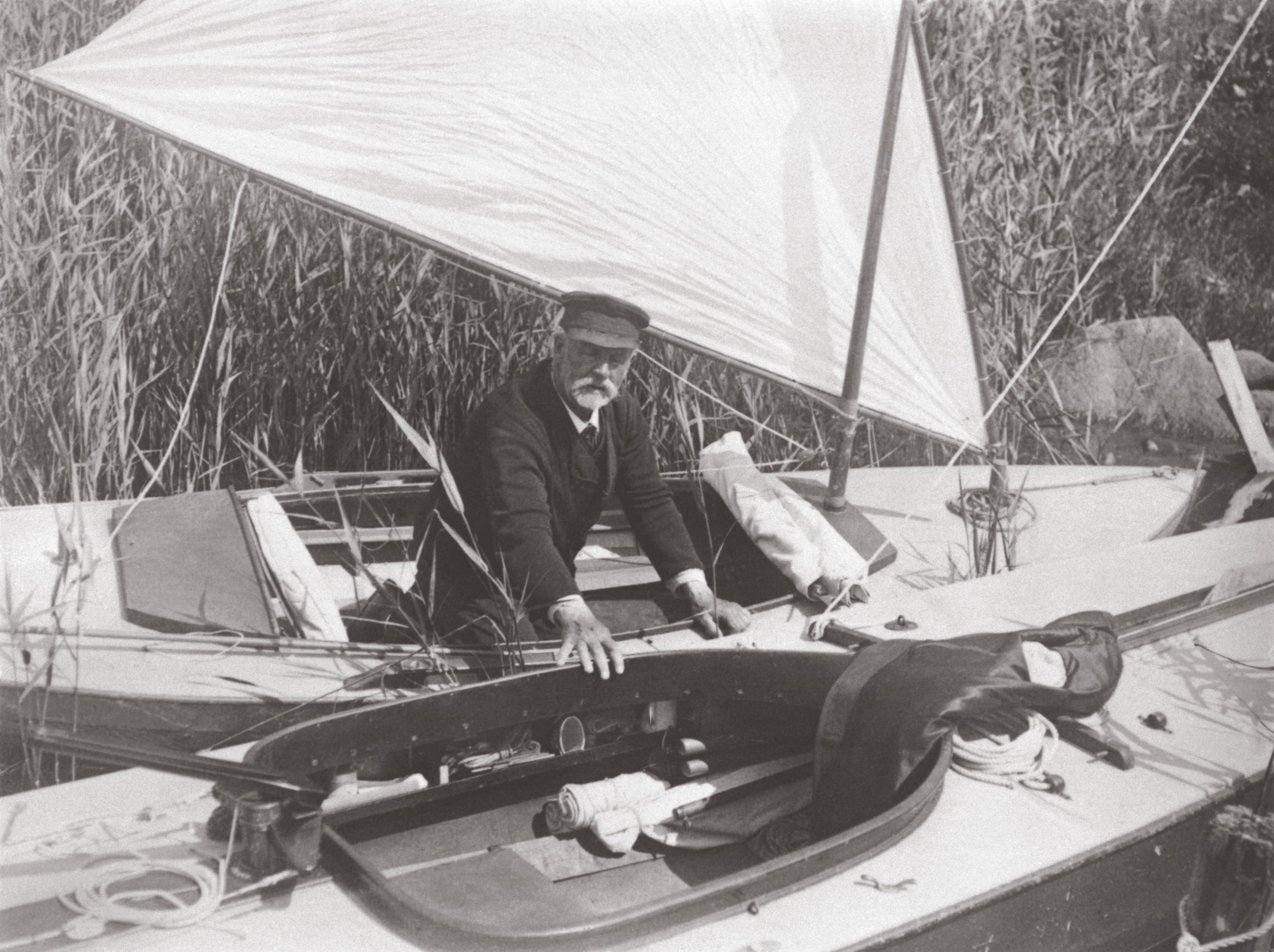
Smith in one of the canoes he designed, c. 1915

At the time, canoeing was largely unknown in Scandinavia, though John MacGregor had visited Sweden in 1865 with his sailing canoe Rob Roy, and Swedish naval officers had come into contact with canoes in international waters. Smith was however an active promoter of canoeing, not least as a contributor to a magazine for sports published by his cousin Viktor Balck (one of the original members of the International Olympic Committee). He also wrote in other magazines, and between 1880 and 1883 he was deputy editor of Ny Illustrerad Tidning. Furthermore, he published several books on nautical topics. When the Stockholm Canoe Club (Föreningen för Kanot-Idrott) was founded by a group of adolescents in 1900, Smith became a mentor for them.

Carl Smith was furthermore active as a designer and constructor of canoes. He left behind at least 36 half hull model boats and canoes, as well as many drawings and blueprints. Some of his designs were experimental; he for example attempted to make canoes out of sheet metal and cardboard. Other designs were more successful; around 100 of the Helsa-type sailing canoes designed by Smith were produced. Among these one, baptised Carmen and built in 1882, was brought on the frigate Vanadis on its circumnavigation of Earth in 1883–1885 and used in Patagonia and on the coast of Peru.
