= Canoe Sailing World Championship =

The Canoe Sailing World Championships is an international competition in canoe sailing, sanctioned by the ICF as the premier event in that discipline.

The competition was first held in 1961 and has been held roughly every 3 years since. British Robin Wood has won the championships a record 4 times

== Medalists ==
Year	Location	Gold	Silver	Bronze
1961	(United Kingdom) Hayling Island	Alan Emus (GBR)	John Hunt (GBR)	Graham Smith (GBR)
1965	(West Germany) Lake Constance	Alan Emus (GBR)	Lars Johanssen (SWE)	John A. Biddle (GBR)
1969	(United Kingdom) Grafham Water	Alan Emus (GBR)	Gunnar Aggefors (SWE)	John A. Biddle (GBR)
1972	(Sweden) Oxelösund	Martin Rosell (SWE)	Gunnar Aggefors (SWE)	John A. Biddle (GBR)
1975	(United Kingdom) Hayling Island	Lars-Erik Lundgren (GBR)	Leif Johansson (SWE)	Mats Lind (SWE)
1978	(Sweden) Fiskeboda	Martin Gullberg (SWE)	Steve Clark (USA)	Lars-Erik Lundgren (SWE)
1981	(United States) Buzzards Bay	Max Tollqvist (SWE)	Olle Berqvist (SWE)	Steve Clark (USA)
1984	(Sweden) Ängelholm	Steve Clark (USA)	Chris Converse (USA)	Hannah Clark (USA)
1987	(United Kingdom) Plymouth	Robin Wood (GBR)	Lars Guck (USA)	Patrick Marshall (GBR)
1990	(West Germany) Steinhuder Meer	Lars Guck (USA)	Steve Clark (USA)	Jens Reichert (FRG)
1993	(United States) San Francisco	Robin Wood (GBR)	Steve Clark (USA)	Lars Guck (USA)
1996	(Australia) Port Stephens	Robin Wood (GBR)	Mark Goodchild (GBR)	Anders Petersson (SWE)
1999	(Sweden) Nynäshamn	Lester Noble (GBR)	Mark Goodchild (GBR)	Anders Petersson (SWE)
2002	(United States) Bristol	Steve Clark (USA)	Anders Petersson (SWE)	Eric Chase (USA)
2005	(United Kingdom) Weymouth	Mark Goodchild (GBR)	John Ellis (GBR)	Simon Allen (GBR)
2008	(Australia) Port Philipp	Hayden Virtue (AUS)	Bill Beaver (USA)	Seth Dunbar (AUS)
2011	(Germany) Travemünde	Chris Maas (USA)	Peter Ullman (GER)	Alistair Warren (GBR)
2014	(United States) San Francisco	Mikey Radziejowski (USA)	Chris Maas (USA)	Alistair Warren (GBR)
2017	(United Kingdom) Pwllheli	Robin Wood (GBR)	Chris Maas (USA)	Alistair Warren (GBR)
2020	Cancelled (Note: Postponed to 2022 due to COVID-19 restrictions, later it was cancelled.)			
2024	(Germany) Travemünde	Glen Truswell (GBR)	Michael Costello (USA)	Mike Fenwick (GBR)

== See also ==
- International Canoe Federation
