= FKI =

FKI may refer to:

- FKi 1st, Artist
- FKi (production team), an American record production team
- Bangoka International Airport, in Kisangani, Democratic Republic of the Congo
- Free Knowledge Institute, a Dutch open software organization
- Federation of Korean Industries, a South Korean economic organization
- FKI (company), a former British manufacturing company
- Föreningen för Kanot-Idrott (Stockholm Canoe Club), Sweden's oldest canoe club
