= Johan Norderling =

Swedish colonial administrator and diplomat (1760–1828)

Governor of Saint Barthélemy
- In office 20 August 1819 – 27 April 1826
- Monarch: Charles XIV John
- Preceded by: Carl Fredrik Berghult
- Succeeded by: James Haarlef Haasum

Personal details
- Born: 23 February 1760 Bjursås, Sweden
- Died: 31 May 1828 (aged 68) Gustavia, Swedish Saint Barthélemy

Johan Norderling (February 23, 1760 – May 31, 1828) was a Swedish colonial administrator and diplomat, who served as governor over Saint Barthélemy from 1819 to 1826, the only Swedish colony at the time.

== Biography ==
Norderling was born in Dalarna, to the dean Gabriel Norderling and his wife, Anna Christina (née Lundewald). He became a student at Uppsala University in 1778 and earned a master's degree in 1782. After completing his education, he became a clerical officer at the Office of Trade and Finance and later served as secretary to the Swedish legation in Tangier. In 1787, he was appointed as a judiciary in Saint Barthélemy, which had recently been acquired by Sweden as a colony. Norderling began practicing law and worked as a notary public in Gustavia. According to a census from 1796, he was listed as single and living together with two slaves.

Norderling married Jeanne Madeleine de Mont d'Or from Guadeloupe, and the couple had one daughter. The family returned to Sweden in 1798. In 1801, Norderling became a trade agent in Algiers and was promoted to consul general in 1815.

In 1817, he was appointed chargé d'affaires in Washington, an office he never assumed due to his appointment as governor of Saint Barthélemy the following year. Norderling and his family returned to Saint Barthélemy in 1819.

=== Governor of Saint Barthélemy ===
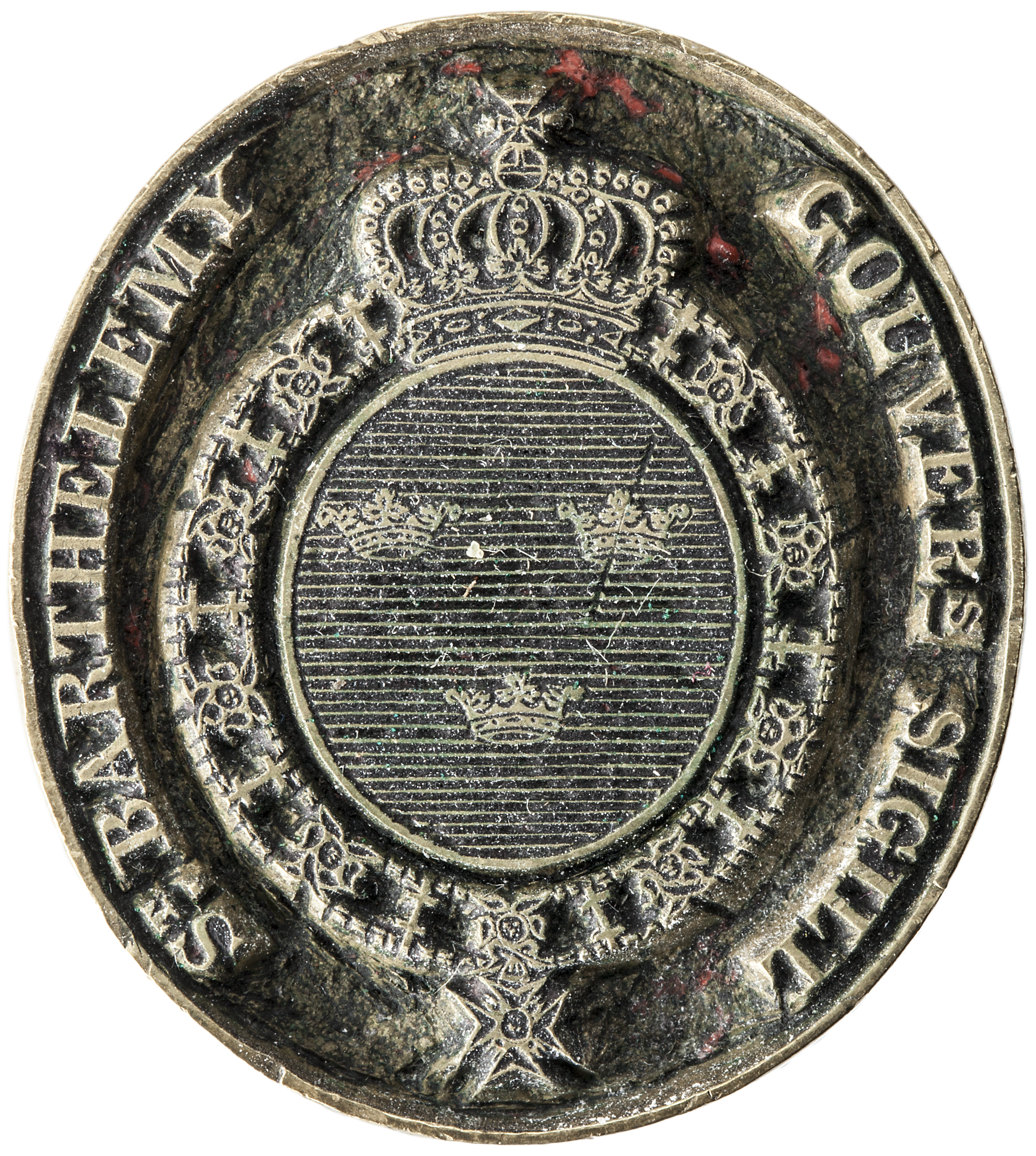
Seal of the Swedish governor of Saint Barthélemy, 1784–1878.

As governor, he was initially praised by the people of the island for his efforts in aiding those in distress after a hurricane struck in September 1819. Norderling had an indifferent stance on the abolition of slavery. At that time, the colony had a total population of 4,587, consisting of 1,738 whites, 816 free blacks, and 2,033 slaves. In 1822, Norderling sent a report to the Foreign Ministry in which he advised against granting free Swedes of colour the right to vote in local elections.

In a report made by Robert Harrison and sent to U.S. secretary of state John Quincy Adams, Harrison, who had tried in vain to be recognized as U.S. consul in Gustavia, was tasked with investigating smuggling and slave trafficking in the Caribbean. Harrison described Norderling as a man addicted to excessive drinking and as the "chief of a band of pirates". An anonymous letter published in the Federal Gazette & Baltimore Daily Advertiser in 1822 depicted Saint Barthélemy as a barren rock, entirely dependent on the United States for supplies, where pirates operated freely on Île Fourchue, conducting business with plundered goods and slaves. Norderling had been aware of the slave trade in the vicinity of the colony by the French and other actors but had not acted against it, as Swedish merchants were engaged in the profitable smuggling of sugar and coffee to the nearby French islands.

In 1823, the colony's surplus amounted to just 1,524 Spanish dollars, whereas in 1815, it had been 139,627 Spanish dollars. The decline in profits was the result of the British and many newly independent nations in Latin America opening their ports to American merchant vessels and traders, thus reducing Gustavia's role as a porto franco in the region. By 1825, the colony's economy had deteriorated to the point that only 60% of the civil servants' salaries on the island could be paid. Norderling himself had to cut his own salary. The following year, he was dismissed and left the administration of the colony to his two sons-in-law, James Haarlef Haasum and Lars Gustaf Morsing. He withdrew to his estate at Anse de Public.

Norderling succumbed to injuries after falling off a horse in 1828. He was buried in the Catholic cemetery in Lorient.

Political offices
Preceded by Carl Fredrik Berghult	Governor of Saint Barthélemy; 1819–1826	Succeeded by James Haarlef Haasum
