= Proposed United States annexation of Santo Domingo =

1869 attempted U.S. treaty to annex the Dominican Republic

Proposed annexation of Santo Domingo
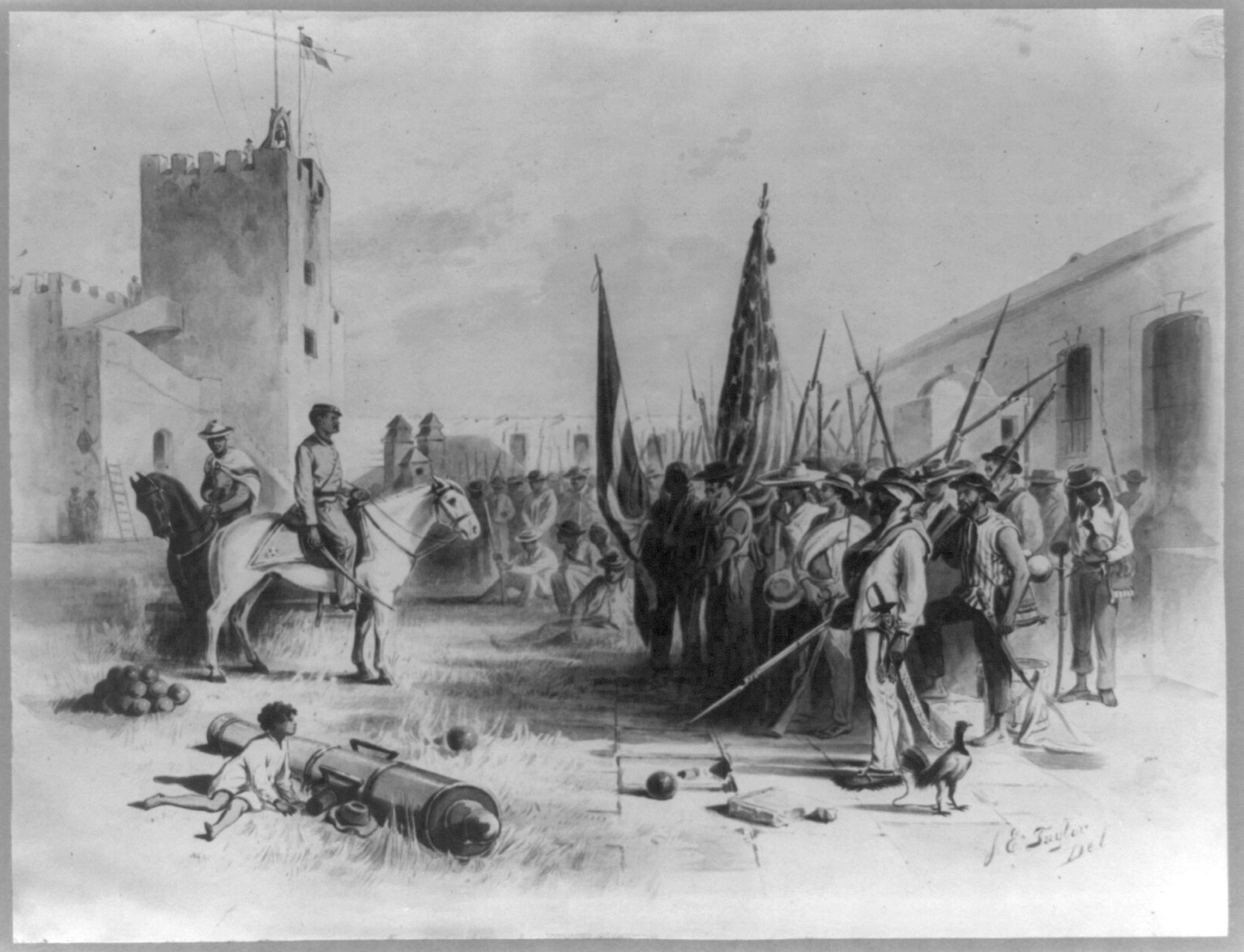
- Santo Domingo City; Watercolor by James E. Taylor 1871
- Date: 1869–1871
- Location: Washington, D.C.
- Participants: United States, Dominican Republic
- Outcome: Treaty defeated in the U.S. Senate - June 30, 1870

The proposed annexation of Santo Domingo was an attempted treaty during the later Reconstruction era, with precedents under earlier administrations, but re-initiated by United States President Ulysses S. Grant in 1869, to annex Santo Domingo (as the Dominican Republic was commonly known) as a United States territory, with the promise of eventual statehood. President Grant feared some European power would take the island country in violation of the Monroe Doctrine. He privately thought annexation would be a safety valve for African Americans who were suffering persecution in the US, but did not include this in his official messages. Grant also believed that the acquisition of Santo Domingo would help bring about the end of slavery in Cuba and elsewhere. The proposal to annex Santo Domingo aligned with a broader US foreign policy strategy in the Reconstruction era, including pursuit of new markets in the Caribbean to absorb the increasing industrial output of American businesses. The island's raw material wealth made it an attractive prospect for the U.S. commercial interest of seeking economic expansion in the region.

In 1869, Grant commissioned his private secretary Orville E. Babcock and Rufus Ingalls to negotiate the treaty of annexation with Dominican president Buenaventura Báez. A treaty was drafted by Secretary of State Hamilton Fish that included the annexation of the country itself and the purchase of Samaná Bay for two million American dollars. Also included and supported by Grant was the provision that the Dominican Republic could apply for statehood.

The annexation process drew controversy: opponents Senator Charles Sumner and Senator Carl Schurz denounced the treaty vehemently, alleging it was made only to enrich private American and island interests and to politically protect Báez. Sumner believed that Baez was a corrupt despot and that the use of the US Navy by Grant during the treaty negotiation to protect the Dominican Republic from invasion by neighboring Haiti while the annexation process took place, was illegal. Sumner claimed that annexationists wanted the whole island and would absorb the independent black nation of Haiti. He, along with Schurz, also opposed mixed-race people becoming US citizens. Both men used arguments linking climate and race, stating that to annex the tropical area of Santo Domingo would be damaging to the Anglo-Saxons of the US, who were more suited to temperate climates, and to the black people of Santo Domingo, who they believed were more suited to tropical climates. A plebiscite ordered by Báez, who believed the Dominican Republic had better odds of survival as a US protectorate and could sell a much wider range of goods to the US than could be sold in European markets, registered an improbably low 11 votes against annexation, compared to over ten thousand for annexation. The country's unstable history was one of invasion, colonization, and civil strife.

The treaty ultimately failed to reach the two-thirds vote needed under the Treaty Clause (the vote was a tie). In order to vindicate the failed treaty annexation, Grant sent a committee, authorized by the United States Congress and including African American abolitionist Frederick Douglass, that investigated and produced a report favorable to annexation of the Dominican Republic into the United States. However, the annexation treaty ultimately failed because there was little support for it outside Grant's circle. The defeat of the treaty in the Senate directly contributed to the division of the Republican party into two opposing factions during the presidential election of 1872: the Radical Republicans (composed of Grant and his loyalists) and the Liberal Republicans (composed of Schurz, Sumner, Horace Greeley as presidential candidate, and other opponents of Grant).

== Conflict and strife in Santo Domingo ==
When the annexation was proposed, Santo Domingo had experienced decades of political instability, marked by civil wars, coups, and foreign occupations. Dominicans suffered under Haitian rule, which repressed their Dominican culture and Spanish language in favor of French. Following their achievement of independence in 1844, they experienced periods of both Republican and Authoritarian rule, characterized by political elites like Buenaventura Báez (who favored US annexation) and Pedro Santana (who favored Spanish annexation). In 1861, the country was occupied by Spanish forces, sparking a brutal guerrilla war for independence known as the Restoration War, which devastated the nation's economy and society.

The post-restoration period saw ongoing power struggles between Báez and his political opponents. Baez repeatedly sought US annexation to secure his grip on power, whilst also stabilizing the economy and gaining protection from Haiti. He presented the country's instability as a justification for foreign intervention, which critics viewed as prioritizing his own political power over national sovereignty.

== Annexation proposal ==
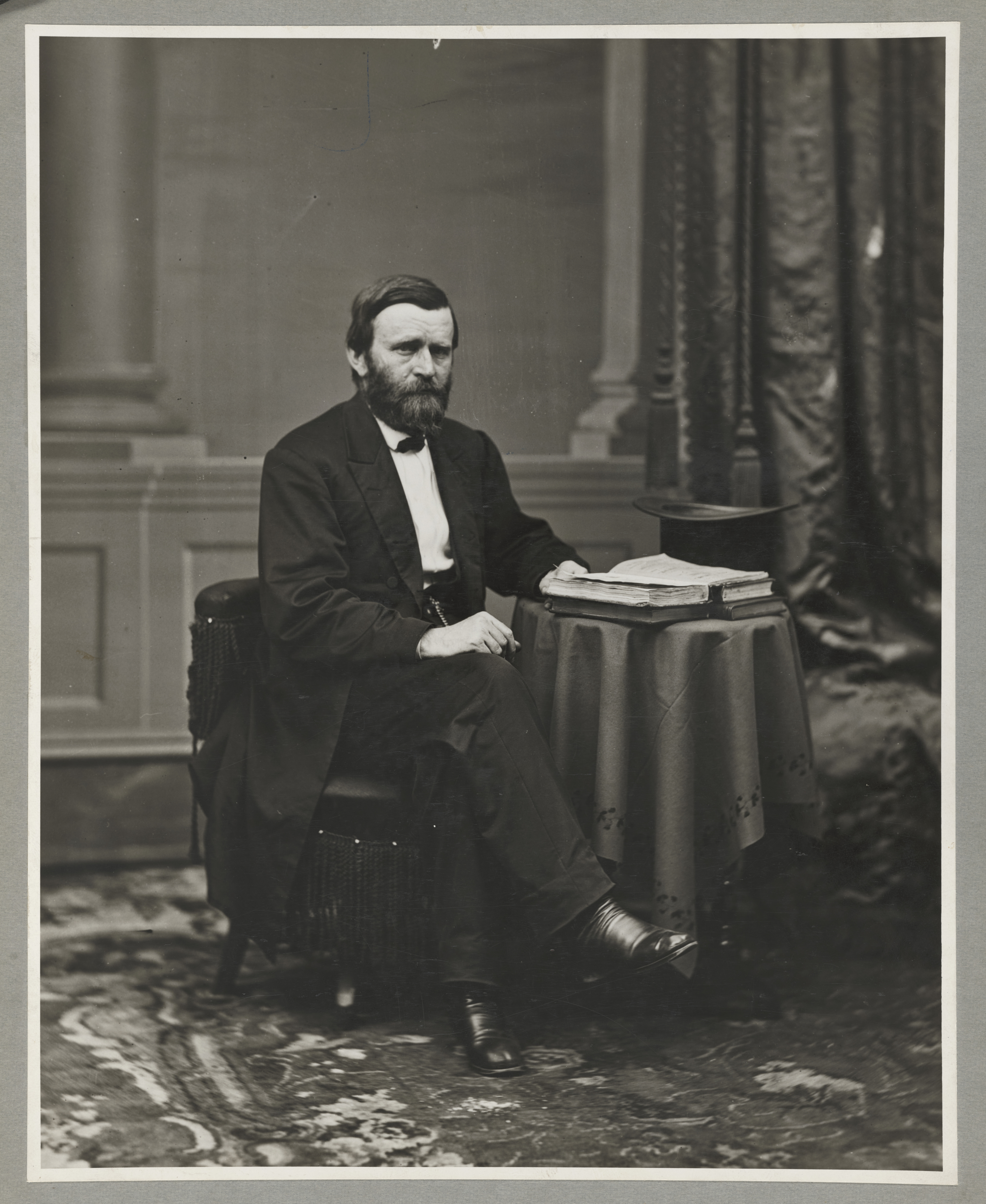
President Ulysses S. Grant

Threatened by Haitian invasion, the Dominican government had asked to be annexed to the United States during President Andrew Johnson's administration in 1867. However, refusal by Congress meant that this did not make any progress. As well as facing the threat from Haiti, which had been present since the invasion of Toussaint Louverture in 1801, there was the threat of internal revolt due to the tumultuous politics of Santo Domingo. There were a small group of American settlers on Santo Domingo, including William Cazneau and Joseph Fabens, who had arrived in the 1850s and, after pursuing the wealth of the island, owned one-tenth of the land in the Dominican Republic. They became involved in Dominican politics, and by the time Grant was in power self-interest caused fear of the impacts that volatile internal politics could have on their wealth. With these motives they supported the idea of annexing Santo Domingo to the US, and managed to gain the support of President Baez. However despite Baez’s attempts to sell Samaná bay and peninsula to the US in 1868, it was only when Grant was in power that Fabens managed to secure presidential support for the proposal of wider annexation.

Grant initially rejected ideas of expansion, but Fabens managed to persuade him of the benefits of annexation. This may have been because Grant believed that a separate annexation project in the Caribbean would have more success than previous attempts by his predecessors to annex the territory of Saint Thomas and that he had a greater chance of success due to the control his party had over Congress and the Committee of Foreign Affairs in both houses.

In 1869, Grant sent his aide General Orville Babcock to gather information on the Dominican Republic. Babcock was specifically requested to investigate the agricultural and mineral wealth of the island and the attitude of the government towards the US. Furthermore, current Secretary of State Hamilton Fish had fears over the race of the Dominican Republic and asked Babcock to collect information on the different races that lived there. Rather than official diplomatic authority, Grant personally gave Babcock special agent status with an introduction letter for the Dominican president.

Grant feared that other European powers would take control of Santo Domingo and used the need to maintain the Monroe Doctrine as one of his reasons behind annexation. Grant's vision aligned with the doctrine and its aim to protect US interests from that of Europe in the western hemisphere, and by using its language he justified expansion. However it went further than this in that, whilst earlier iterations of the doctrine (which was established in 1823) sought to remove European influence so the US could sustain their presence in a slave based economy, Grant aimed to use the annexation as part of his larger goal to expand liberty and freedom throughout the hemisphere.

The important position of the Dominican Republic

== Racial aspect to the argument ==
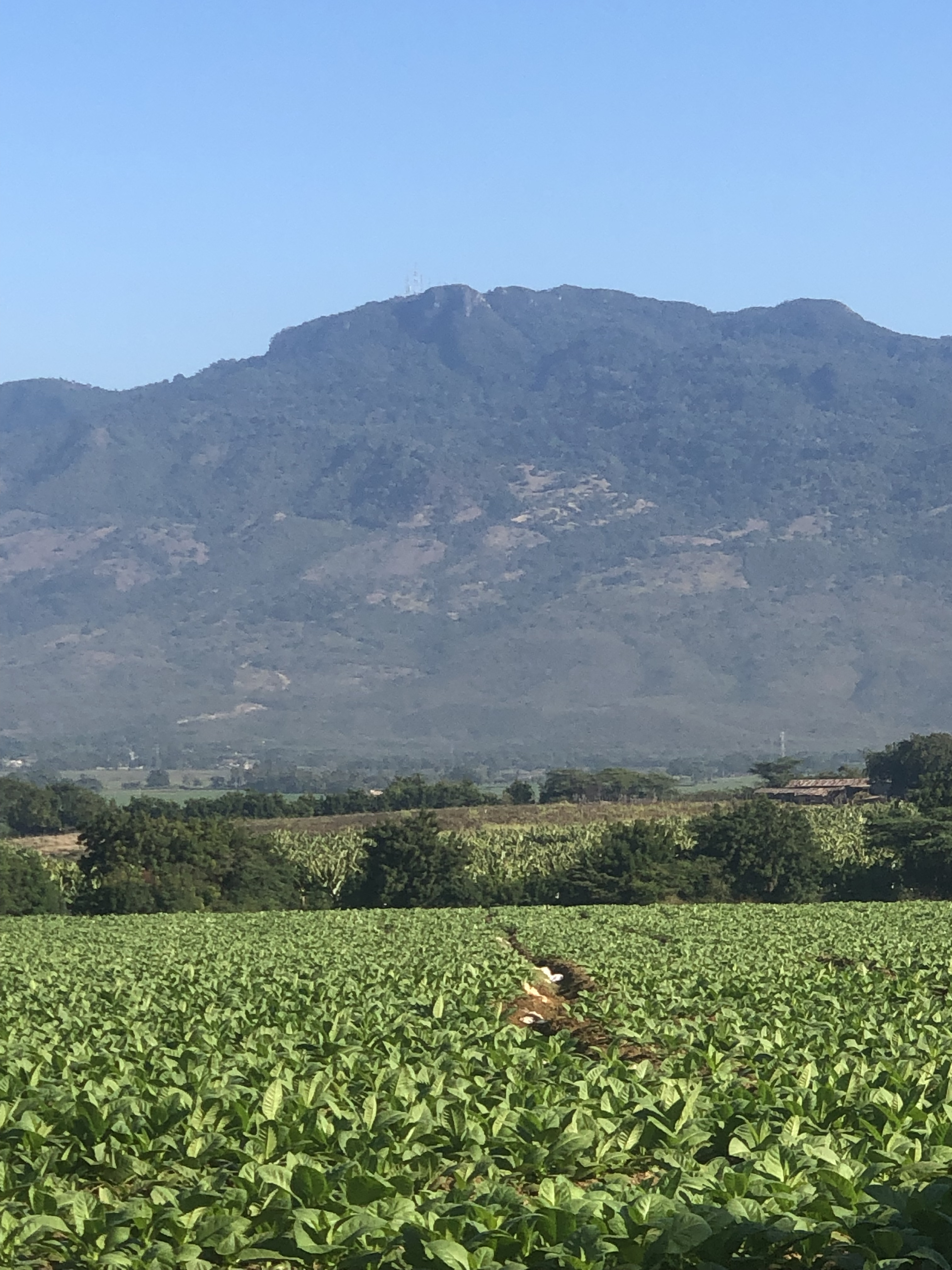
A Dominican tobacco plantation

The annexation proposal was both reinforced and hindered by white nationalist ideas. In the post-Civil War US, the American notion of manifest destiny had evolved to encompass territory outside of continental America. There were many white Americans and US senators who feared incorporating a racially mixed population into the US, largely due to its capacity to dilute the white vote and reshape the status quo, as well as associating the prospective new population with moral decline.

In addition to the coaling station, Grant felt that the Dominican Republic's immense resources could provide sustenance for the mass emigration of African Americans from the South of the US to Santo Domingo. He hoped that this exodus would benefit America, Santo Domingo, and the African Americans since it would lower the chances of a race war within the US; provide skilled workers to the island; and enable the 4 million newly emancipated African Americans in the southern US to leave the racism and poverty of the post-war South and start their own republican nation under the guidance of the US. In his final annual address to the nation in 1876, Grant said that the annexation would have raised the material and political fortunes of millions of African Americans. Their mass movement to Santo Domingo would have made African Americans “master of the situation, by enabling them to demand [their] rights at home on pain of finding them elsewhere.”

Grant also felt that if the US used its resources and technology to turn Santo Domingo into a huge producer of tropical goods (like tobacco and sugar) then it would reduce America's reliance on trade with slave states like Brazil and Cuba, thus helping to end slavery in the Americas.

Although Grant framed the proposal as a moral effort to protect Dominicans, reinforce the Monroe Doctrine, and provide a haven for African Americans fleeing persecution in the Reconstruction South, this rhetoric has been debated by historians as masking deeper concerns of racial integration and white supremacy. Grant's list outlining his reasons behind annexation, 'Reasons Why Santo Domingo Should be Annexed to the United States?', argued:

'The colored man cannot be spared until his place is supplied, but with a refuge like Santo Domingo his worth here would soon be discovered and he would soon receive such recognition as to induce him to stay: or if Providence designed that the two races should not live together he would find a home in the Antillas'

The safety valve of African American emigration that Grant's writing describes potentially indicates that annexation was influenced by an evolved manifest destiny, that justified American expansionism as a civilizing mission to export Anglo-American values to underdeveloped nations incapable of self-governance. However Nicholas Guyatt argues that the annexation process should be seen in a more complex context rather than a racist plan more similar to the earlier efforts of the American Colonization Society. The annexation of Santo Domingo was discussed where it would be incorporated into the US as a state of the Union and supporters of annexation believed that this would come with significant white migration to the Caribbean, rather than it being a way of removing the African American population.

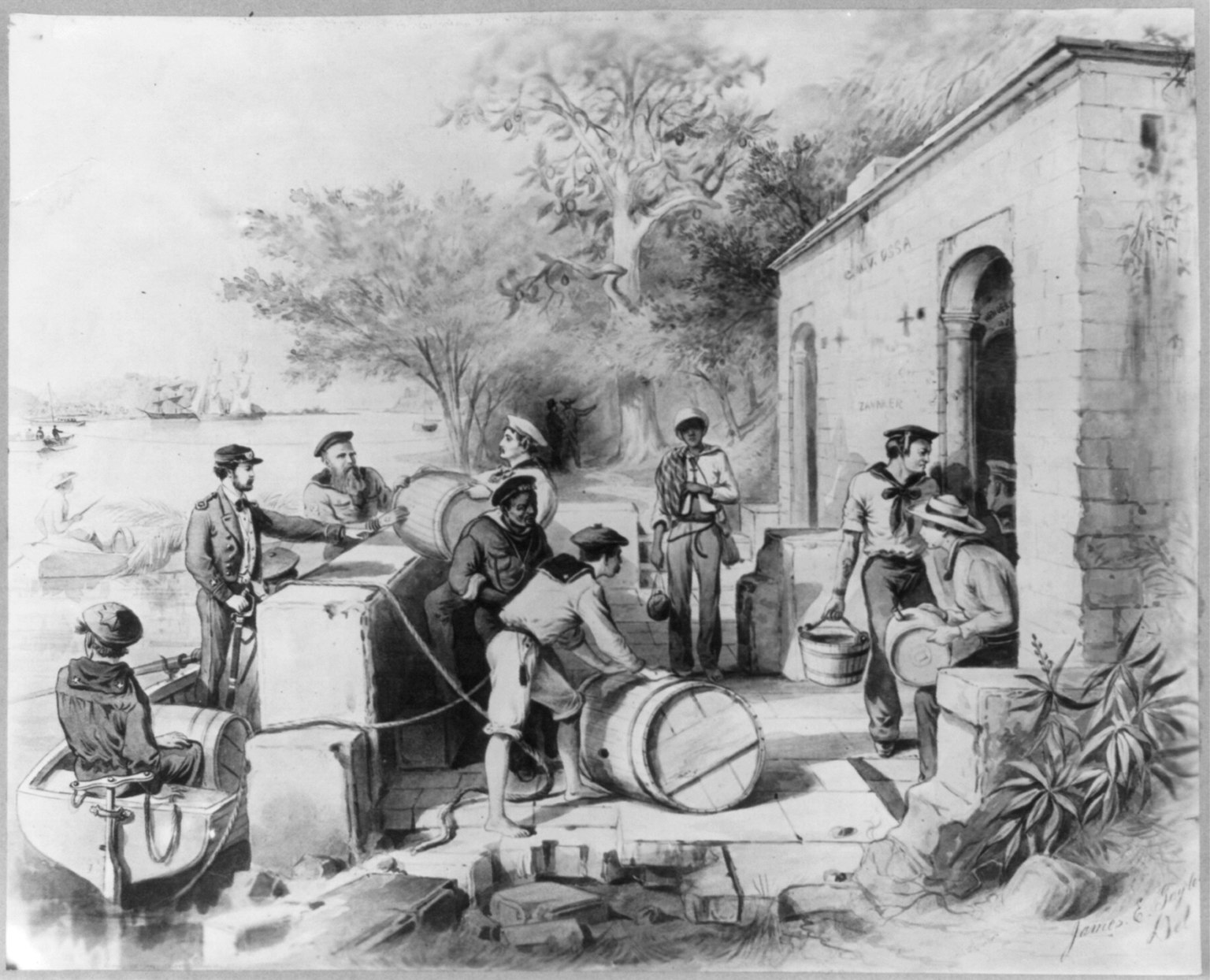

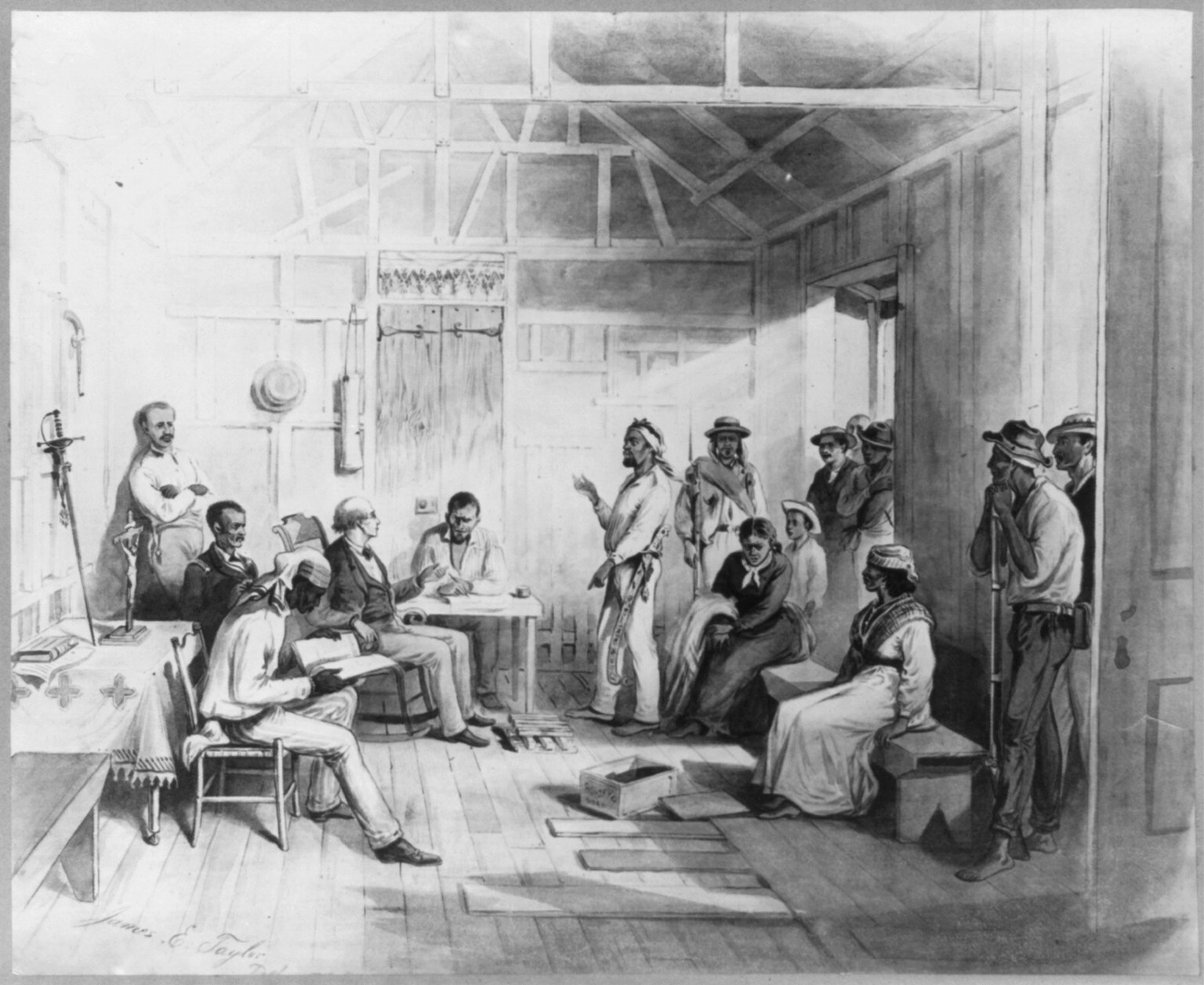

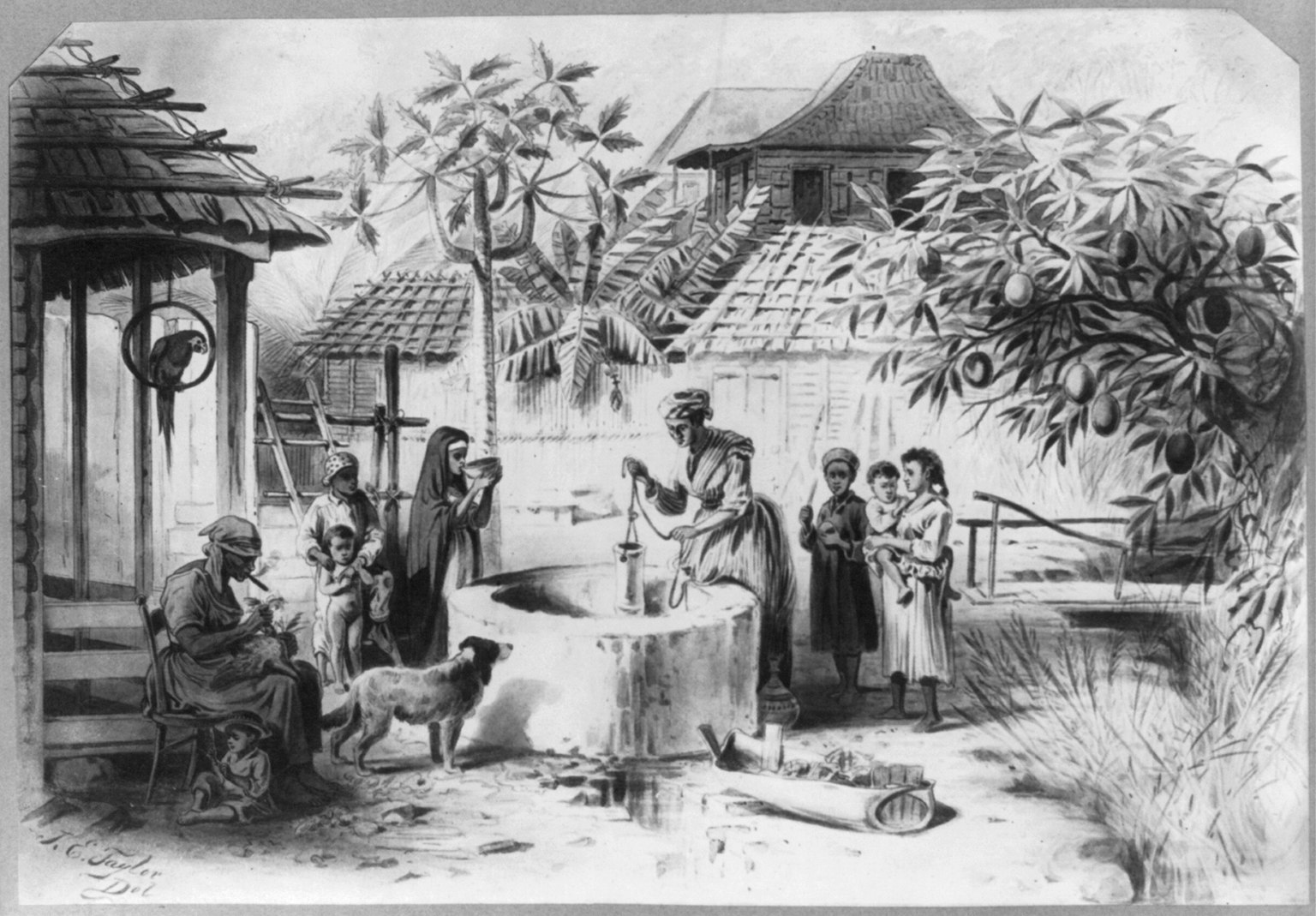

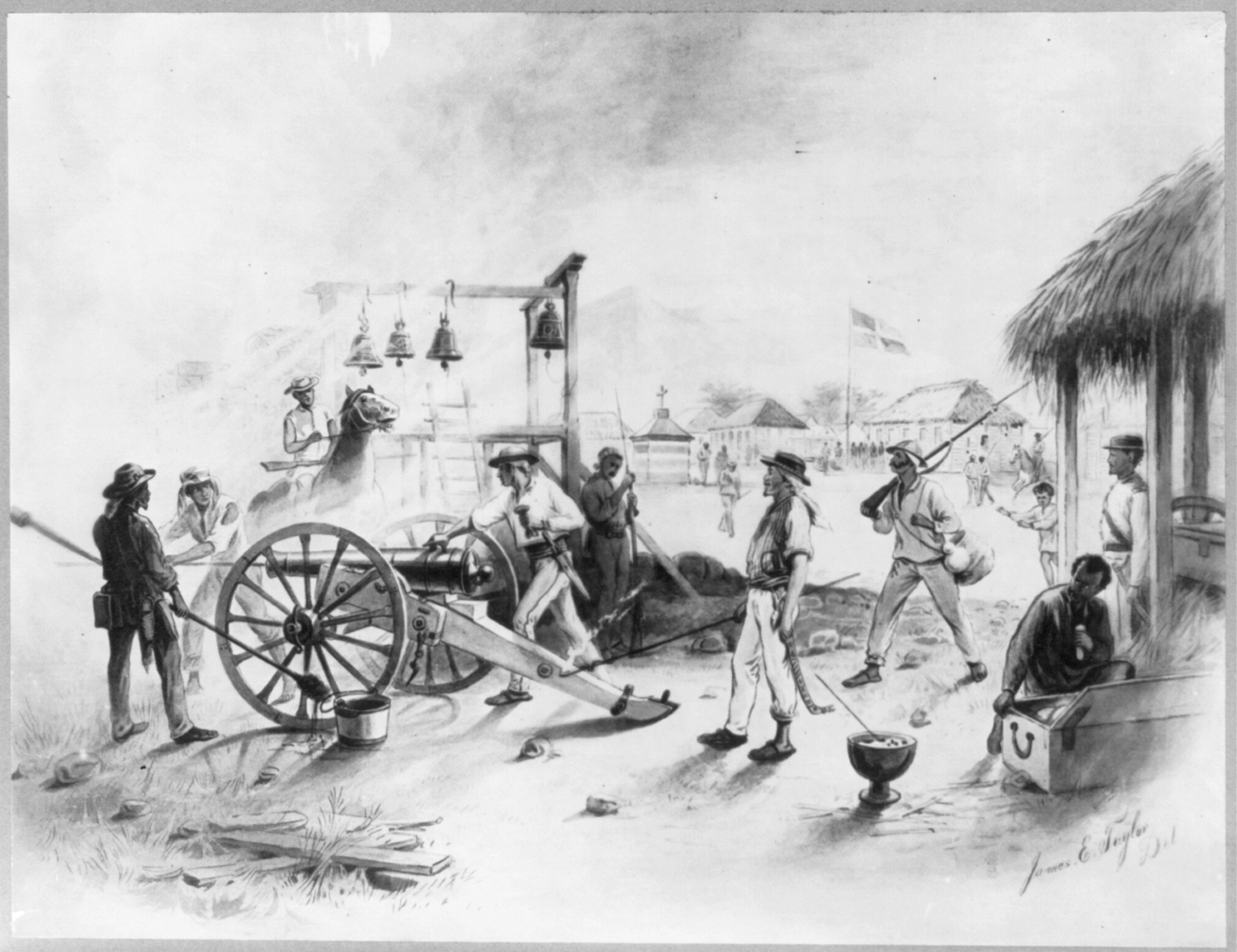

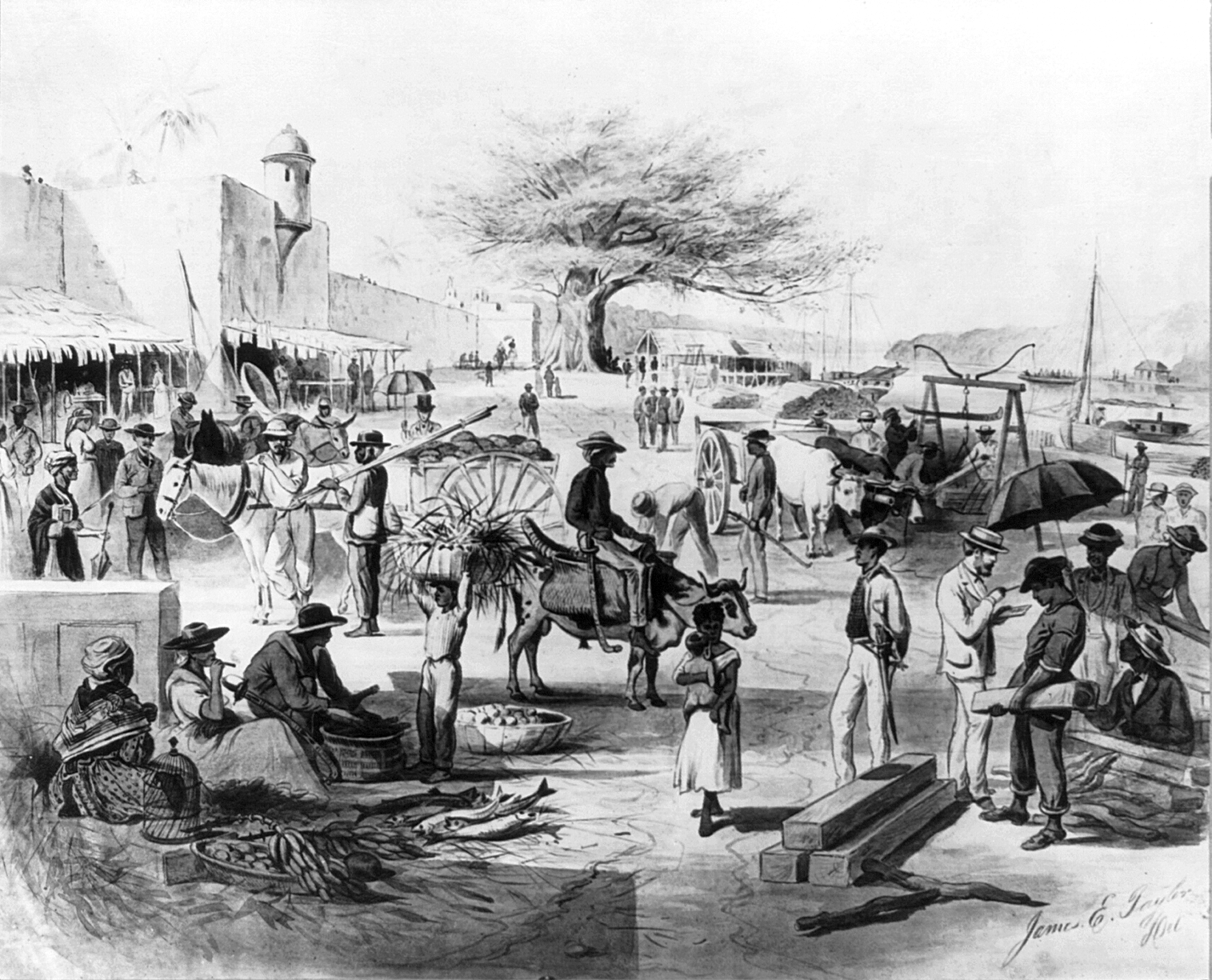

== Abolitionists and annexation ==
The prospect of annexing Santo Domingo was discussed not only among Grant and official policy makers, but also among non-state actors such as abolitionists. Within the context of Reconstruction and recent post-Civil War emancipation, annexation on equal terms to the states of the US and the promise of gaining one hundred and fifty thousand new black citizens, was seen as having great potential.

Despite this, annexation saw mixed views among black leadership. While P. B. S. Pinchback and Gerrit Smith argued that the move would split the Republican Party and that this was only the start of Grant's plan to annex the whole island, other leaders, such as Frederick Douglass and Hiram R. Revels, supported annexation.

Douglass supported the treaty in the hopes that it would improve poor economic and political conditions in Santo Domingo, and also believed that it would bring mutual benefits, giving Santo Domingo a stable government and providing the US with rich territory. Despite opposition and the idea that annexation would make black people appear unfit for self government, he argued that Santo Domingo was too weak to survive independently and that the extension of the ideals of liberty and equality present in the US would help the country progress. Revels saw the US with a Christian duty to extend its institutions towards Santo Domingo.

Abolitionist Samuel Howe was also a supporter of the treaty. Howe was a close friend of Sumner, and though both men were abolitionists, they were completely opposed on annexation, with Howe supporting it. Nicholas Guyatt argues that, along with Sumner, Howe was a key figure in Santo Domingo debates, but unlike his friend, supported the annexation. Despite this position and his supposed opposition to racial segregation, Howe made use of the same logic of race and climate that figures such as Sumner used in critiquing annexation. He insisted that different climates existed on the Santo Domingo side of the island compared to the Haiti side in order to gain support and also spent time trying to whiten Dominicans in comparison to their Haitian neighbors, in a bid to make annexation seem more favorable. Efforts were similarly made by Douglass, who was reported as saying the Dominicans were 'a far superior people to the Haytians.'

== Annexation treaty created ==
In September 1869, Babcock returned to Washington with a draft treaty of annexation. Grant's cabinet was stunned, not knowing that Babcock had planned to draw up an annexation treaty. Grant presented Babcock's informal treaty for his Cabinet to read, however, no Cabinet member offered any discussion on the treaty. Grant then asked Fish to draw up a formal diplomatic treaty, since Babcock did not have diplomatic authority. Having not been consulted on the Dominican treaty process, Fish was ready to resign from the Cabinet, however, Grant intervened having told Fish he would have complete control of the State Department, except for the Dominican Republic annexation treaty. Fish and Grant privately agreed that Fish would remain on the Cabinet and support Dominican annexation while Grant would not support Cuban belligerence during the Ten Years' War. On October 19, 1869, Fish drew up a formal treaty; the United States would annex the Dominican Republic, pay $1,500,000 (equivalent to $32,000,000 in 2025) on the Dominican national debt, offer the Dominican Republic the right to US statehood, and the US would rent Samaná Bay at $150,000 per annum for 50 years. According to Grant's biographer, Jean Edward Smith, Grant initially erred by not gaining US public support and by keeping the treaty process secret from the U.S. Senate.

== Grant visited Sumner ==
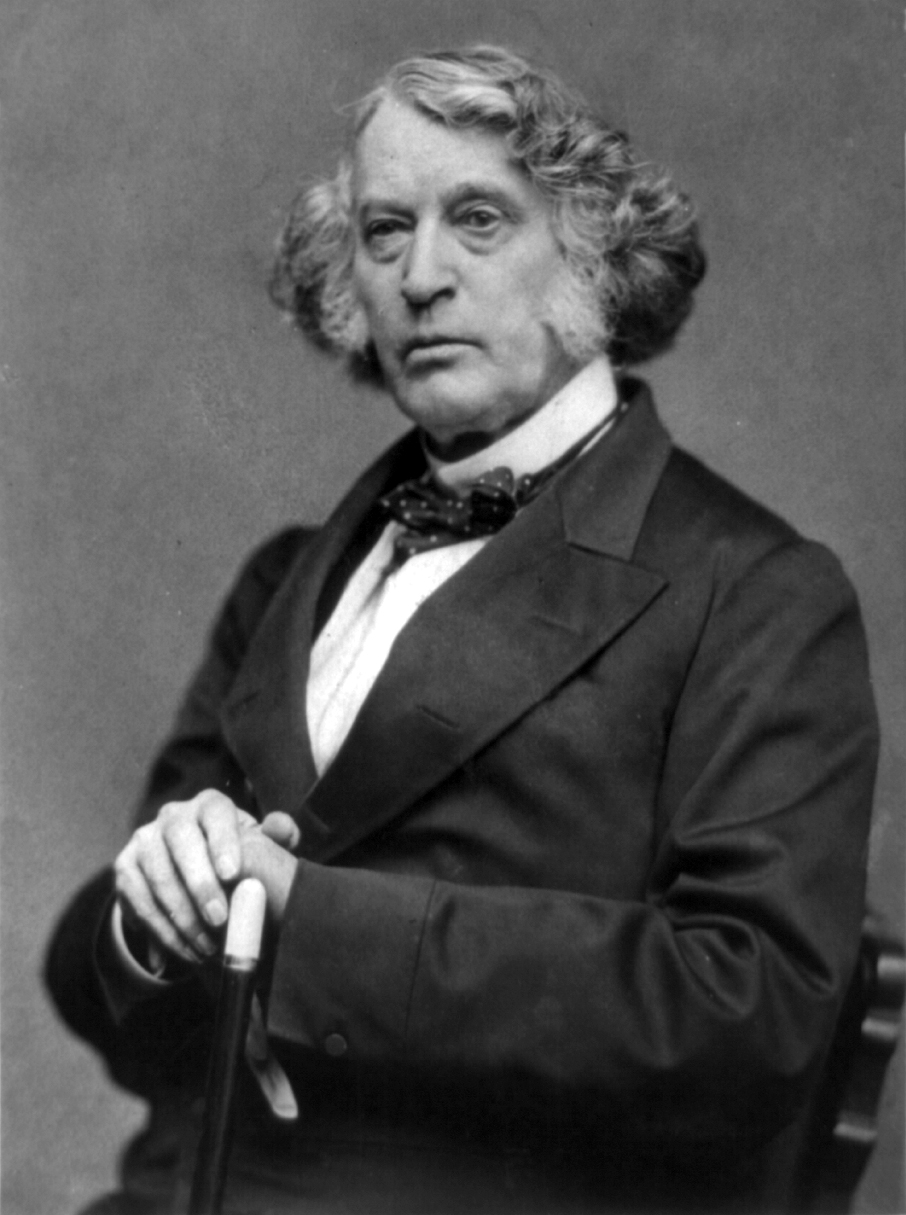
Senator Charles Sumner

On January 2, 1870, prior to the formal treaty being submitted to the Senate, Grant made an unprecedented visit to Senator Charles Sumner at his home in Washington, D.C. Grant specifically informed Sumner of the Dominican Republic annexation treaty hoping for Sumner's support. Sumner was the powerful Chairman of the Senate Foreign Relations Committee and his support for the Dominican Republic treaty was crucial for passage in the Senate. The dialogue between the two men has been the subject of debate and controversy since the meeting. Different sources vary as to what exactly Sumner had said, however, Grant optimistically had walked away having believed Sumner had supported his treaty. Sumner stated that he only told Grant that he was a "Republican and an Administration man".

== Treaty submitted and failure ==
On January 10, 1870, Grant formally submitted Fish's Dominican Republic annexation treaty to the U.S. Senate. The treaty was stalled in the Senate until Sumner's Foreign Relations Committee started hearings in mid February, 1870. Fish noted that the Senate was reluctant to pass any measures initiated by the executive branch. There was widespread opposition in the Senate to absorbing a nation with so many black and mixed-race inhabitants.

Sumner allowed the treaty to be debated openly on the Committee without giving his own opinion. However, on March 15, Sumner's Foreign Relations Committee in a closed session voted to oppose the treaty 5 to 2. On March 24, in another closed session, Sumner came out strongly against the treaty. Sumner opposed the treaty believing annexation would be expensive, launch an American empire in the Caribbean, and would diminish independent Hispanic and African creole republics in the Western Hemisphere. Grant met with many senators on Capitol Hill hoping to rally support for the Treaty, to no avail. Grant refused the suggestion that the treaty drop the Dominican statehood clause.

Eventually on the evening of June 30, 1870, the Senate defeated the Dominican Republic annexation treaty by a vote of 28 to 28. Eighteen Republican senators joined Sumner to defeat the Dominican annexation treaty.

Vote to ratify the treaty
June 30, 1870	Party		Total votes
June 30, 1870	Democratic	Republican	Total votes
Yea	0	28	28
Nay	9	19	28
Not Voting			13
Roll call vote on the report: Senator / Party / State / Vote; Joseph Carter Abbott / R / North Carolina / Yea; Henry B. Anthony / R / Rhode Island / Yea; Arthur I. Boreman / R / West Virginia / Nay; Simon Cameron / R / Pennsylvania / Yea; Eugene Casserly / D / California / Nay; Alexander G. Cattell / R / New Jersey / Yea; Zachariah Chandler / R / Michigan / Yea; Roscoe Conkling / R / New York / Yea; Cornelius Cole / R / California / Yea; Henry W. Corbett / R / Oregon / Yea; Garrett Davis / D / Kentucky / Nay; Charles D. Drake / R / Missouri / Yea; George F. Edmunds / R / Vermont / Nay; Reuben Fenton / R / New York / Yea; Orris S. Ferry / R / Connecticut / Nay; Joseph S. Fowler / R / Tennessee / Nay; James Harlan / R / Iowa / Yea; William T. Hamilton / D / Maryland / Nay; Hannibal Hamlin / R / Maine / Yea; John S. Harris / R / Louisiana / Nay; Jacob M. Howard / R / Michigan / Yea; Timothy O. Howe / R / Wisconsin / Nay; James B. Howell / R / Iowa / Yea; John W. Johnston / D / Virginia / Nay; Thomas C. McCreery / D / Kentucky / Nay; Alexander McDonald / R / Arkansas / Yea; Justin S. Morrill / R / Vermont / Nay; Lot M. Morrill / R / Maine / Nay; Oliver P. Morton / R / Indiana / Yea; James W. Nye / R / Nevada / Yea; Thomas W. Osborn / R / Florida / Yea; James W. Patterson / R / New Hampshire / Nay; John Pool / R / North Carolina / Nay; Daniel D. Pratt / R / Indiana / Nay; Alexander Ramsey / R / Minnesota / Yea; Hiram Revels / R / Mississippi / Yea; Benjamin F. Rice / R / Arkansas / Yea; Thomas J. Robertson / R / South Carolina / Nay; Edmund G. Ross / R / Kansas / Nay; Frederick A. Sawyer / R / South Carolina / Nay; Willard Saulsbury / D / Delaware / Nay; Carl Schurz / R / Missouri / Nay; William Sprague / R / Rhode Island / Yea; George E. Spencer / R / Alabama / Yea; William M. Stewart / R / Nevada / Yea; John P. Stockton / D / New Jersey / Nay; Charles Sumner / R / Massachusetts / Nay; John Milton Thayer / R / Nebraska / Yea; Allen G. Thurman / D / Ohio / Nay; Thomas Tipton / R / Nebraska / Nay; George Vickers / D / Maryland / Nay; Willard Warner / R / Alabama / Yea; Waitman T. Willey / R / West Virginia / Nay; George H. Williams / R / Oregon / Yea; Henry Wilson / R / Massachusetts / Yea

== Aftermath and repercussions ==
Grant was livid at the treaty's failure to pass the Senate and blamed Sumner's opposition for the defeat; he had believed that Sumner originally supported the treaty after their meeting in 1870, despite the misunderstanding that seemed to have occurred. Shortly after the treaty's defeat, Grant fired the US Ambassador to Britain, John Lothrop Motley, which was interpreted as an insult to Sumner since they were close friends. There were also wider changes in personnel, with the resignation of Attorney General Hoar after Grant asked for full support of the treaty also being linked to the failed annexation.

Despite the initial failure of the treaty, Grant was able to get Congress to send an investigation commission to Santo Domingo in order to make an assessment of whether annexation would beneficial to both the US and Santo Domingo. The commission, sent in 1871, included civil rights activist Frederick Douglass and reported favorably on the annexation of the Dominican Republic to the United States, claiming there was widespread local support for annexation. However they failed to generate enough enthusiasm in the Senate to overcome the overall opposition to the annexation. As the aforementioned local plebiscite on annexation only involved 30% of the Dominican electorate, the whole affair may have failed to adequately account for the wishes of the population regarding annexation versus continued independence.

== Commission for the annexation of Santo Domingo ==
The commission found itself in favor of annexation, despite conflicting interests amongst its members. Frederick Douglass found himself at odds with his close friend Charles Sumner, who was a staunch critic and opponent of the annexation in the US Senate. Douglass had also previously supported independence and self-governance for Black-majority nations in the Caribbean, only recently expressing his support for Cuban resistance in the Ten years war. Despite these reasons he ultimately found himself advocating for annexation after witnessing firsthand the poverty, political instability and devastation caused by slavery and civil war in the region.

Douglass came to believe that annexation might offer economic development and protection for the Dominican people from nearby threats like Haiti and meddling in the region from European powers. However, his position drew criticism, as many feared annexation was driven by imperial ambitions and would reinforce racial hierarchies. Douglass's participation was symbolic of the tensions between racial solidarity and the realities of U.S. foreign policy during the reconstruction era. Despite his efforts, the senate rejected the annexation proposal, highlighting the limits of black political influence in shaping imperial policy in this era.

== Domestic political fallout ==
The annexation debate had lasting political consequences, fueling a rift within the Republican Party. President Grant's aggressive use of his power to force through the treaty — including sending a naval vessel to transport the commission without Senate approval, led to accusations of executive overreach and imperial ambition. His use of political backchannels — sending Babcock, an ally from his military days — to discuss treaty terms instead of elected state diplomats led to accusations of corruption and helped galvanize opposition amongst Liberal Republicans like Sumner.

These tensions would culminate in the Liberal Republican revolt of 1872, when a coalition of disillusioned Republicans and anti-imperialists broke from the party to challenge Grant's re-election. The failed annexation was emblematic of broader concerns: the growing power of the presidency, overseas interference, imperial expansionism, and a perceived abandonment of the moral ideals that defined the party during the Civil War.

== See also ==
- List of proposed state mergers
- Dominican Republic–United States relations
- 1873 Dominican Republic Samaná Peninsula referendum
- Ostend Manifesto
- Six Years' War
- Frederick Douglass
- Ulysses S. Grant
- Buenaventura Báez
