= Föreningen för Kanot-Idrott =

Canoe club in Stockholm, Sweden

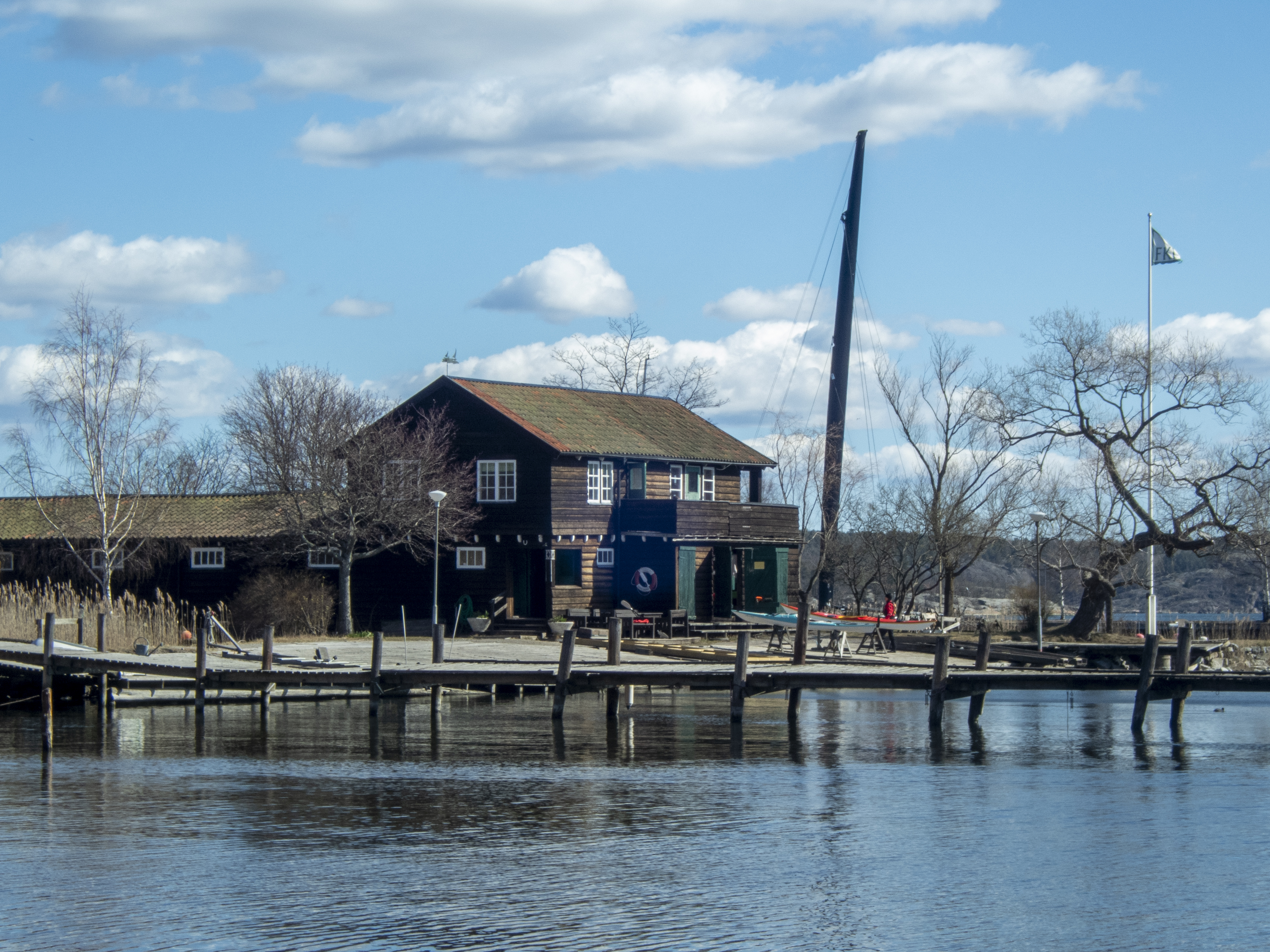
The FKI boathouse on Måsholmen island off Djurgården

Föreningen för Kanot-Idrott, FKI, or in international context Stockholm Canoe Club, is a canoe club based in Stockholm, Sweden. Founded in 1900, it is Sweden's oldest canoe club and precedes the national canoe organization Svenska Kanotförbundet by four years. The club is open for paddling and canoe sailing.

The club is based on the islet of Måsholmen, just off Djurgården in central Stockholm.

The Stockholm Canoe Club pioneered paddling and canoe sailing in Sweden, inspired by the Swedish naval officer Carl Smith and indirectly by John MacGregor's 1866 canoe tour from Kristiania to Stockholm. A number of the club's members have contributed own innovative canoe designs, e.g. Sven Thorell, Gerhard Högborg, Arvid Rosengren and Nils-Göran Bennich-Björkman. An early permanent member of the club was the British maritime historian and sailor of small boats and canoes, R. C. Anderson, who wrote about several of his canoe tours in Nordic waters.

Since 1902, the club arranges Djurgårdsloppet, a 9 km kayak race around Djurgården island. The Djurgårdsloppet race is one of the oldest regular sports competitions in Sweden.
