= Georg Wilhelm Netherwood =

Swedish colonial civil servant (1828 - 1903)

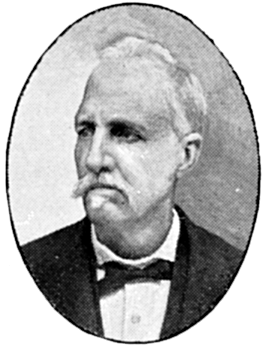
- Netherwood in 1899

Governor of Saint Barthélemy
- In office 11 August 1868 – 4 December 1868
- Monarch: Charles XV
- Preceded by: Fredrik Carl Ulrich
- Succeeded by: Bror Ludvig Ulrich

Personal details
- Born: 21 August 1828 Gustavia, Swedish Saint Barthélemy
- Died: 5 July 1903 (aged 74) Gustavia, Saint Barthélemy

Georg Wilhelm Netherwood (21 August 1828 – 5 July 1903) was a Swedish colonial civil servant, who served as acting governor over Saint Barthélemy in 1868, the only Swedish colony in the West Indies at the time.

== Biography ==
Netherwood was born in 1826 in Gustavia to Georg Magnus Netherwood a customs controller from Stockholm and his wife Mary, née Jackson.

In 1848, Netherwood became a student at Uppsala University, and upon finishing his studies, he went on to work at the central bank in Stockholm and also served in the royal court as kammarjunkare from 1856 to 1859. He returned to Saint Barthélemy in 1860, where he served as an accountant, as well as a notary for le conseil, a translator, and at times as government secretary. Upon the death of governor Fredrik Carl Ulrich, Netherwood assumed the role of acting governor and later served as secretary to the new governor, Bror Ludvig Ulrich.

After the return of the island to France in 1878, Netherwood opted to remain in Gustavia, working as vice consul for Sweden–Norway on the island until his death. He is buried in the cemetery at Anse de Public.

Netherwood had five children and was married twice: first to Malvina Augusta Abott, and later to the widow Ann Emily Tracy.

Political offices
Preceded by Fredrik Carl Ulrich	Governor of Saint Barthélemy; 1868	Succeeded by Bror Ludvig Ulrich
