= Bror Ludvig Ulrich =

Swedish naval officer and civil servant (1818–1887)

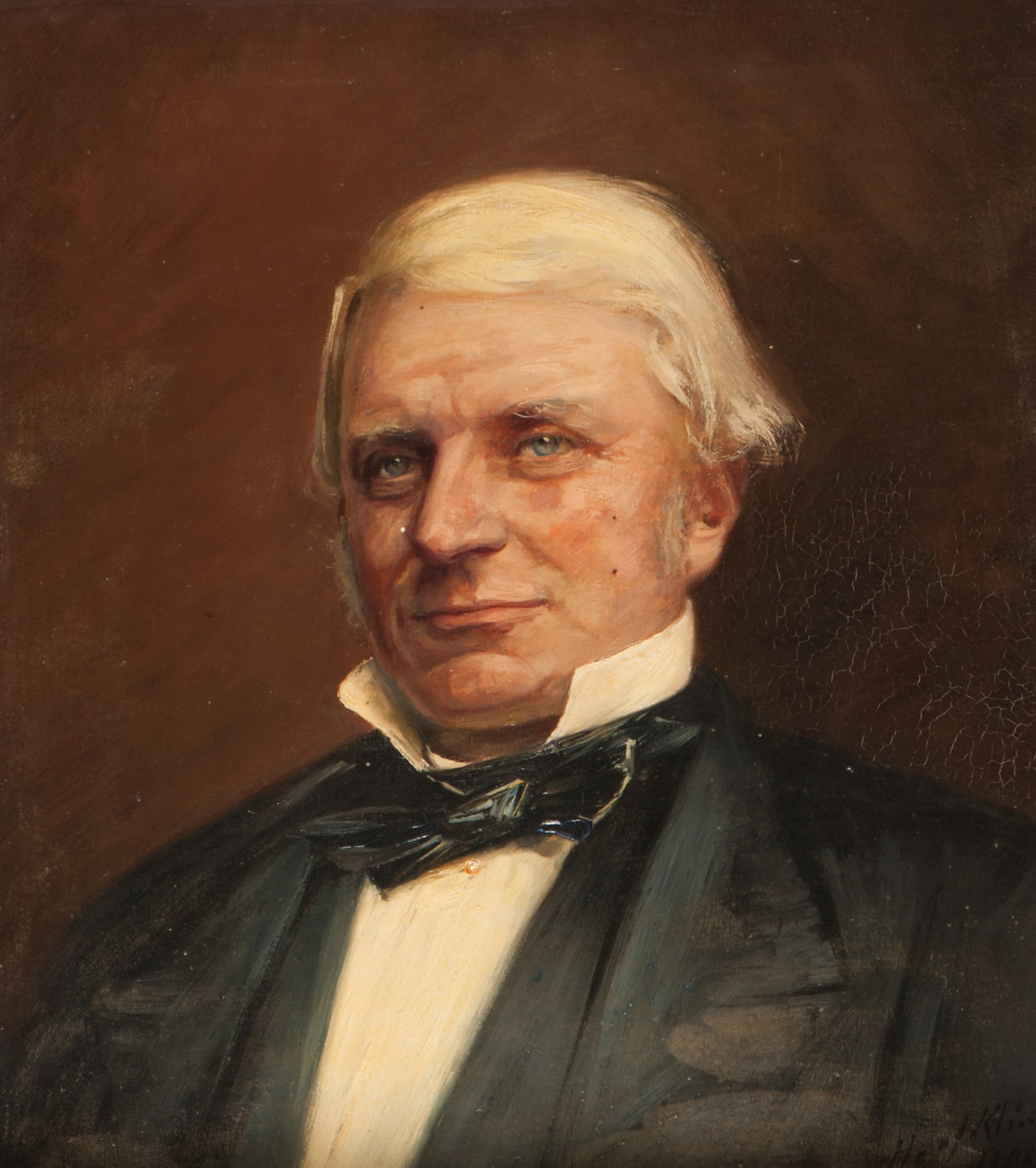

Governor of Saint Barthélemy
- In office 4 December 1868 – June 1874
- Monarchs: Charles XV; Oscar II
- Preceded by: Georg Wilhelm Netherwood (acting)
- Succeeded by: Alarik Helleday (acting)
- In office 5 November 1875 – 16 March 1878
- Monarch: Oscar II
- Preceded by: Alarik Helleday (acting)
- Succeeded by: Position abolished

Personal details
- Born: 6 March 1818 Stockholm, Sweden
- Died: 11 September 1887 (aged 69)
- Resting place: Galärvarvskyrkogården
- Spouse: Josefina Edla Lovisa Dorph
- Relations: Fredrik Carl Ulrich (brother)
- Children: 3
- Education: Royal Swedish Naval Academy

Bror Ludvig Ulrich (6 March 1818 – 11 September 1887) was a Swedish naval officer and civil servant who served as the last governor of the Swedish colony of Saint Barthélemy from 1868 to 1878. Ulrich was given his first naval command in 1834, and rose the rank of commander-captain by 1866. He was appointed as governor due to the death of Governor Fredrik Carl Ulrich, his brother.

== Early life ==
Bror Ludvig Ulrich was born in Stockholm, Sweden, on 6 March 1818, to Johan Kristian Henrik Ulrich (1781–1849), the private secretary of King Charles XIV John. Bror's grandfather, theologian Fredrik Daniel Didrik Ulrich (1752–1812), was from Mecklenburg. Bror's brother Fredrik Carl Ulrich served as governor of the Swedish colony of Saint Barthélemy.

Ulrich was educated at the Royal Swedish Naval Academy and was placed in charge of the brig Vänta Litet, his first naval command, in May 1834. He was in command of the corvette Jarramas from 1835 to 1837. After taking the naval officer exam in 1838 he was appointed as second lieutenant. He was a member of a surveying expedition in 1842. He worked in the British navy from 1843 to 1845. He was promoted to first lieutenant in September 1846, and was an examination officer at naval schools in Gävle and Härnösand from 1858 to 1862. He was promoted to captain lieutenant on 21 September 1855, and captain on 14 September 1858. He was a teacher at the navigation school in Gävle from 1856 to 1858. For three months in 1861, Ulrich was the depot chief in Gothenburg. He was promoted to commander-captain on 15 May 1866 before being placed on reserve status on 1 October.

== Governor ==
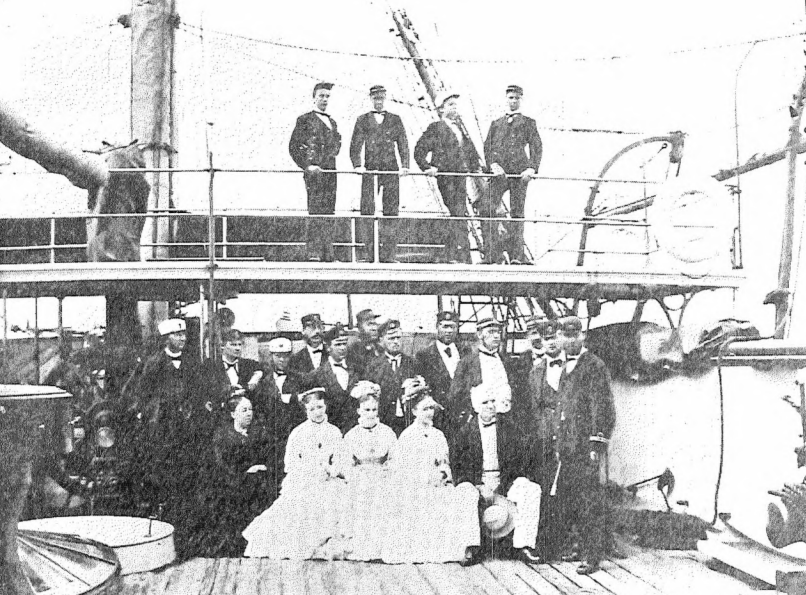
Bror Ludvig Ulrich and his family in 1876

Fredrik Carl Ulrich died on 11 August 1868, and Bror was appointed to replace him. He arrived on the island on 4 December, and He was discharged from the navy on 10 September 1870. Ulrich was acting governor of Saint Barthélemy from 4 December 1868 to 10 September 1870 before serving as the official governor from 10 September 1870 to 16 March 1878. There was a brief time from June 1874 to 5 November 1875 when Ulrich was absent from the colony and Alarik Helleday served as acting governor.

Saint Barthélemy was in a poor state of affairs in the 19th century. The colony lacked the resources for local business and relied on trade between North America and Europe. Trading peaked during the War of 1812, but massively decreased after the United Kingdom opened direct trade with the United States in 1831. The number of cotton bushels fell from 48,000 in 1870, to 5,000 in 1872. A hurricane hit the island on 12 September 1876, and destroyed 93 houses while damaging 328 houses.

Ulrich had a Catholic priest manage the referendum on the transfer of the colony. On 16 March 1878, the colony was formally transferred from Sweden to France. He and his family left the island aboard the HSwMS Vanadis.

== Personal life ==
Ulrich married Josefina Edla Lovisa Dorph, with whom he had three children, on 28 October 1854. He was made a knight of the Order of the Sword in 1861. He died on 11 September 1887, and was buried in the Galärvarvskyrkogården on Djurgården.

== Works cited ==
=== Books ===
- Årbog (PDF). M/S Maritime Museum of Denmark. 1981. ISSN 0085-1418.

=== Journals ===
- Brogren, Per (2013). "A Swedish Interlude in the Caribbean" (PDF). Kamratskap Örlogstradition Sjöförsvar. 79 (1). Men of the Navy: 34–35.
- Tingbrand, Per (2002). "A Swedish Interlude in the Caribbean" (PDF). Naval Forum. Maritime History Society: 64–92.

=== Web ===
- Tingbrand, Per (15 November 1999). "Bror Ludvig Ulrich - Sveriges siste guvernör" (PDF). St Barthélemy-sällskapet.
