= Fredrik Carl Ulrich =

Swedish colonial administrator and civil servant(1808–1868)

Governor of Saint Barthélemy
- In office August 1858 – August 1868
- Monarchs: Oscar I Charles XV
- Preceded by: James Haarlef Haasum
- Succeeded by: Georg Wilhelm Netherwood

Personal details
- Born: 19 June 1808 Norrköping, Sweden
- Died: 11 August 1868 (aged 60) Gustavia, Swedish Saint Barthélemy

Fredrik Carl Ulrich (June 19, 1808 – August 11, 1868) was a Swedish colonial administrator and civil servant who served as governor over Saint Barthélemy from 1858 to 1868, the only Swedish colony in the West Indies at the time.

== Biography ==
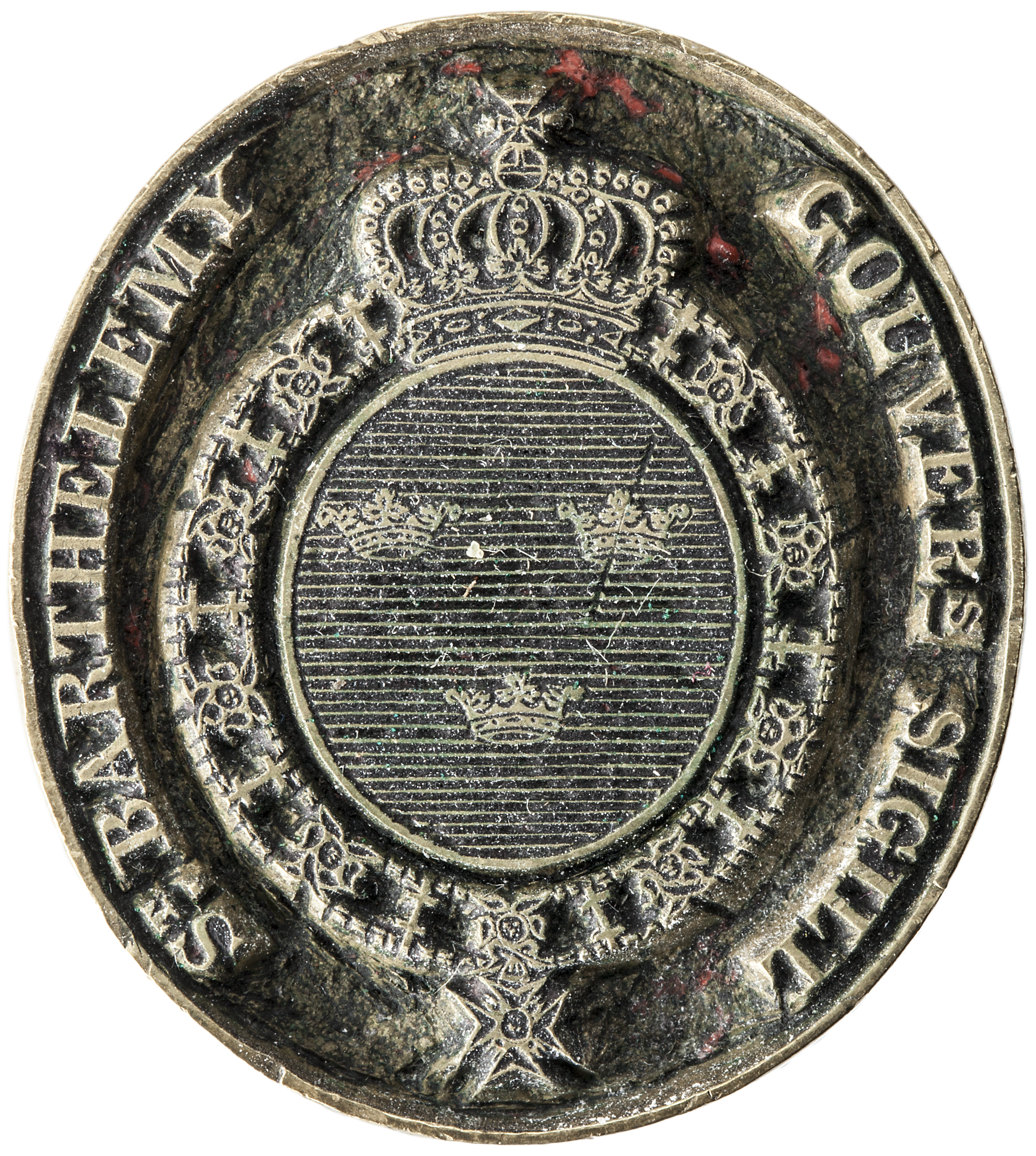
Seal of the Swedish governor of Saint Barthélemy, 1784–1878.

Ulrich was born in 1808 in Norrköping to Johan Kristian Henrik Ulrich and his wife, Sigrid Eleonora (née Rehnström). He enrolled at Uppsala University in 1824 and earned a degree in 1828.

He first arrived in Saint Barthélemy in 1831, working as a notary public in Gustavia, and was appointed government secretary in 1833. From 1841 to 1858, Ulrich served as acting governor on six occasions during governor Haasum's absence. In 1842, he intervened in a case of cruel treatment of a slave, declaring governor Rosenstein's 1787 ordinance as barbaric and advocating for full legal equality between free people and slaves.

=== Governor of Saint Barthélemy ===
Ulrich was named the new governor of the colony in 1858 following Haasum's dismissal due to poor health. At the time of his ascension to the position of governor, the colony had a population of around 2,900. As governor, Ulrich tried to improve the educational system on the island. In a 1866 memorandum, he lamented that only 5% of the rural population was literate. At one point, he even brought in a teacher from Sweden with the hopes of unifying the illiterates among the English-speaking Methodists in Gustavia and the French-speaking Catholics from the countryside into one unified educational system in an attempt to reduce illiteracy—efforts which proved fruitless.

During his governorship, efforts were made to improve local agriculture with a focus on intensifying the exports of pineapple, cotton, tobacco and bananas. This included expanding the farmland to the mornes of the island, a project that had begun in the 1850s. By 1866, cotton exports amounted to 126,183 skålpund, the equivalent of 118,297 lbs, and were being shipped to America and Great Britain. This was a sharp increase from 1858, when cotton exports totaled only 3,600 skålpund or 3,371 lbs. The increased cotton production on Saint Barthélemy happened as a consequence of the American Civil War, which saw a dramatic rise in the price of cotton.

He married Albertina Plagemann, the daughter of a customs controller, in 1833. The couple had four children, three of whom died during a fever epidemic that plagued the island in 1840, which also took the lives of 300 inhabitants on the island.

Ulrich succumbed to an illness in 1868 and was buried on the island. His brother, Bror Ludvig Ulrich, went on to become the last Swedish governor of Saint Barthélemy.

Political offices
Preceded by James Haarlef Haasum	Governor of Saint Barthélemy; 1858–1868	Succeeded by Georg Wilhelm Netherwood
