= Carl Fredrik Berghult =

Swedish military officer and colonial administrator (1794–1834)

Governor of Saint Barthélemy
- In office 19 September 1818 – 20 August 1819
- Monarch: Charles XIV John
- Preceded by: Johan Samuel Rosensvärd
- Succeeded by: Johan Norderling

Personal details
- Born: 24 August 1794 Kristianstad, Sweden
- Died: 7 March 1834 (aged 39)

Military service
- Allegiance: Sweden
- Branch/service: Swedish Army
- Rank: Captain
- Commands: Göta Artillery Regiment; Swedish West Indian Garrison
- Battles/wars: Dano-Swedish War (1808–1809); Swedish–Norwegian War (1814); Battle of Kjølberg Bridge

Carl Fredrik Berghult (August 24, 1794 – March 7, 1834) was a Swedish military officer and colonial administrator who served as governor of Saint Barthélemy from 1818 to 1819, the only Swedish colony in the West Indies at the time.

== Biography ==
Berghult was born to military officer Johan Anders Berghult and his wife, Carolina Charlotta (née Liljegren). He entered the military at the age of 11 and participated in the Dano-Swedish War (1808–1809) and the Campaign against Norway in 1814, taking part in the battle of Kjølberg Bridge. By the end of these conflicts, he had attained the rank of sergeant.

He arrived at Saint Barthélemy on 20 June 1815 aboard the naval brig Delphin, to serve as sergeant-major for the island’s artillery detachment, which at the time consisted of one drummer, one corporal, and 27 privates. On 7 October the same year, he was granted the rank of sub-lieutenant by governor Stackelberg. In 1818, he was appointed placemajor by governor Rosensvärd, a promotion that granted him a seat in the le conseil in Gustavia. Due to Rosensvärd’s illness, Berghult assumed the role of governor of the colony later that same year.

During his governorship, Berghult made efforts to restrict gambling and public events deemed to disrupt public order on the island, policies that were met with harsh resistance from the local population. His time as governor was also marked by significant opposition with regard to his military background and trade policies, which merchants in Gustavia wanted to liberalize.

Berghult returned to Sweden in 1820 and was promoted to captain.

He married Anne Charlotte (née Ritterberg), the daughter of a vicar from Tanum, and the marriage resulted in three children.

Political offices
Preceded by Johan Samuel Rosensvärd	Governor of Saint Barthélemy; 1818–1819	Succeeded by Johan Norderling
