= Johan Samuel Rosensvärd =

Swedish military officer and colonial administrator (1782–1818)

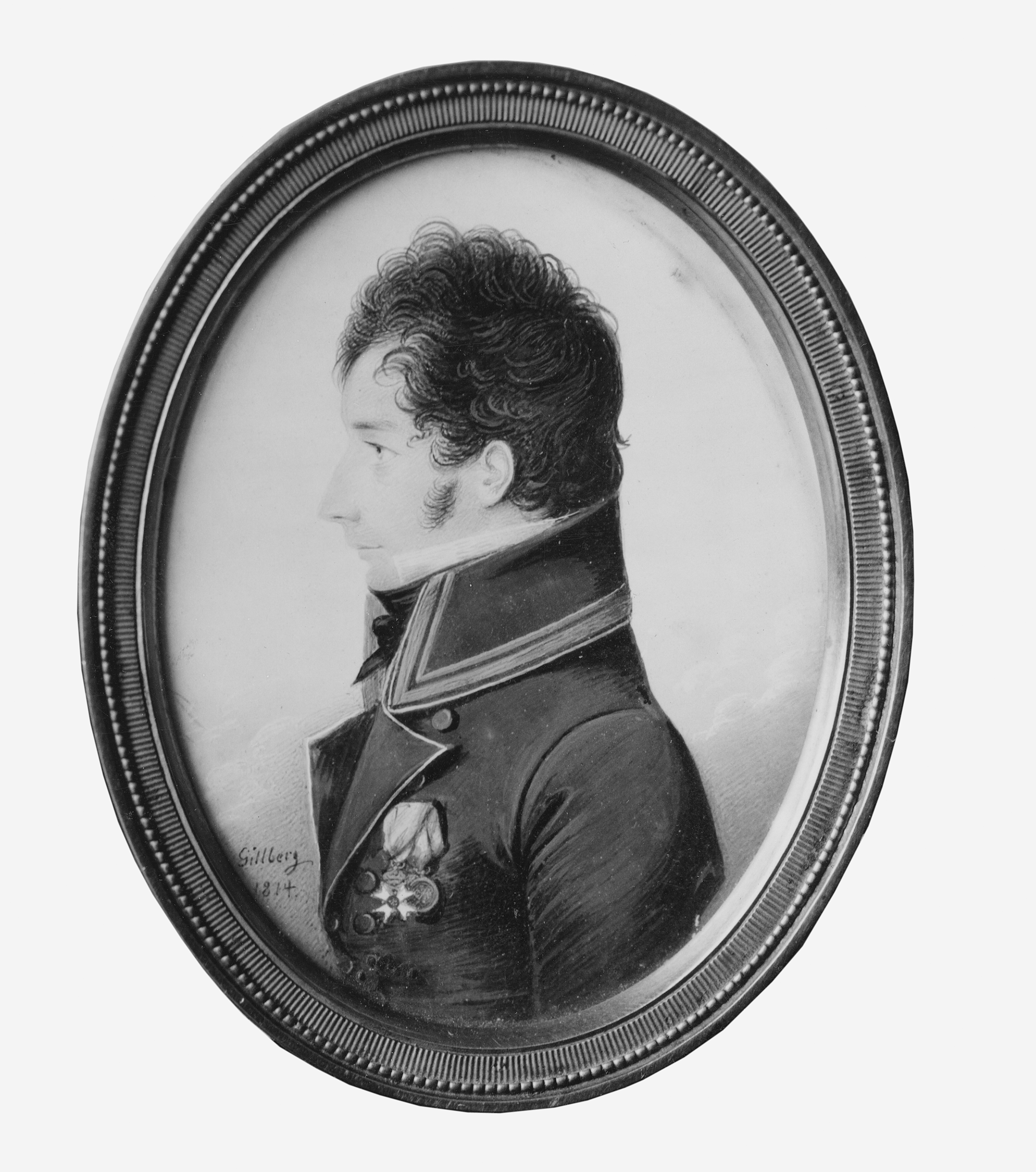
- Portrait by Jacob Axel Gillberg, 1814

Governor of Saint Barthélemy
- In office 10 August 1816 – 19 September 1818
- Monarchs: Charles XIII; Charles XIV John
- Preceded by: Berndt Robert Gustaf Stackelberg
- Succeeded by: Carl Fredrik Berghult

Personal details
- Born: 31 July 1782 Stockholm, Sweden
- Died: 10 December 1818 (aged 36) Nevis, British Leeward Islands

Johan Samuel Rosensvärd (July 31, 1782 – December 10, 1818) was a Swedish military officer and colonial administrator who served as governor of Saint Barthélemy from 1816 to 1818, the only Swedish colony at the time.

== Biography ==
Born to Carl Reinhold Pettersén and Lovisa Eleonora Rabbe, the family had been ennobled in 1781 and took the name Rosensvärd. Rosensvärd entered the military and attained the rank of major in 1814. The following year, he was promoted to lieutenant colonel.

In 1816, Rosensvärd was appointed governor of Saint Barthélemy, a position he held until his death. Displeased with the conditions of the governor's residence and the government secretary's house, located on what is now Rue du Roi Oscar II, Rosensvärd requested extensive renovations for these facilities. He also acquired ten slaves and five servants for his household.

His health worsened in 1818, and he was temporarily relieved of his duties as governor. On the advice of his physician, he travelled to Nevis for treatment after contracting tuberculosis. There, he succumbed to his illness and is believed to be resting in an unmarked grave.

Rosensvärd married Kristina Sofia Appelquist in 1815, and the couple had a son, Johan Henrik Rosensvärd, who later served as Minister of War from 1877 to 1880.

Political offices
Preceded by Berndt Robert Gustaf Stackelberg	Governor of Saint Barthélemy; 1816–1818	Succeeded by Carl Fredrik Berghult
