= Vanadis expedition =

Swedish and Norwegian expedition

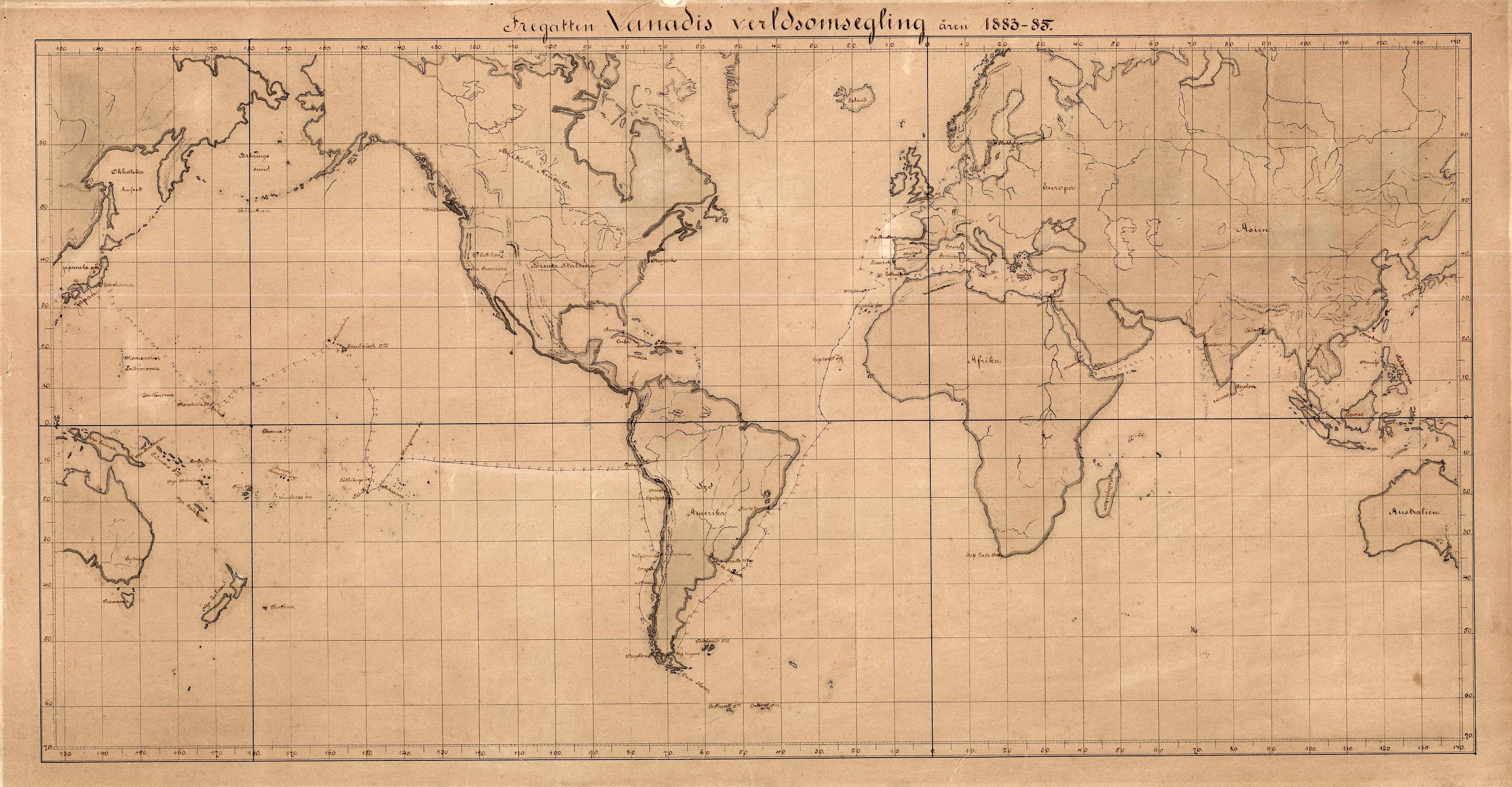
- Map showing the Vanadis expedition.
- Native name: Vanadis världsomsegling 1883–85
- Date: December 5, 1883 – May 9, 1885
- Motive: Training mission, promote Swedish maritime and trade
- Organised by: United kingdoms of Sweden and Norway

The Vanadis expedition was a sailing expedition around the world by HSwMS Vanadis, a steam frigate, visiting South America, Oceania, Asia, and Europe. It took place between 1883 and 1885 and was commissioned by the United Kingdoms of Sweden and Norway. The expedition was of a military, economic, diplomatic, and scientific nature. It was partly a training mission and partly to promote Swedish maritime and trade. Captain of the ship was Otto Lagerberg. Other participants were Crown Prince Oscar, meteorologist Gottfrid Fineman and physician and marine biologist Dr. Karl Rudberg along with more than 300 officers and sailors. On board was also the Swedish archaeologist and ethnographer Hjalmar Stolpe who during land excursions collected 7,500 cultural specimens for an intended ethnographical museum in Sweden. The objects were acquired/purchased from indigenous and Western residents in all places Vanadis stopped. Stolpe was accompanied by photographer Oscar Ekholm which resulted in about 700 pictures.

== Start ==
Vanadis left Karlskrona on 5 December 1883. Last stop in Europe was Lisbon in Portugal which they reached on 23 December.

== South America ==
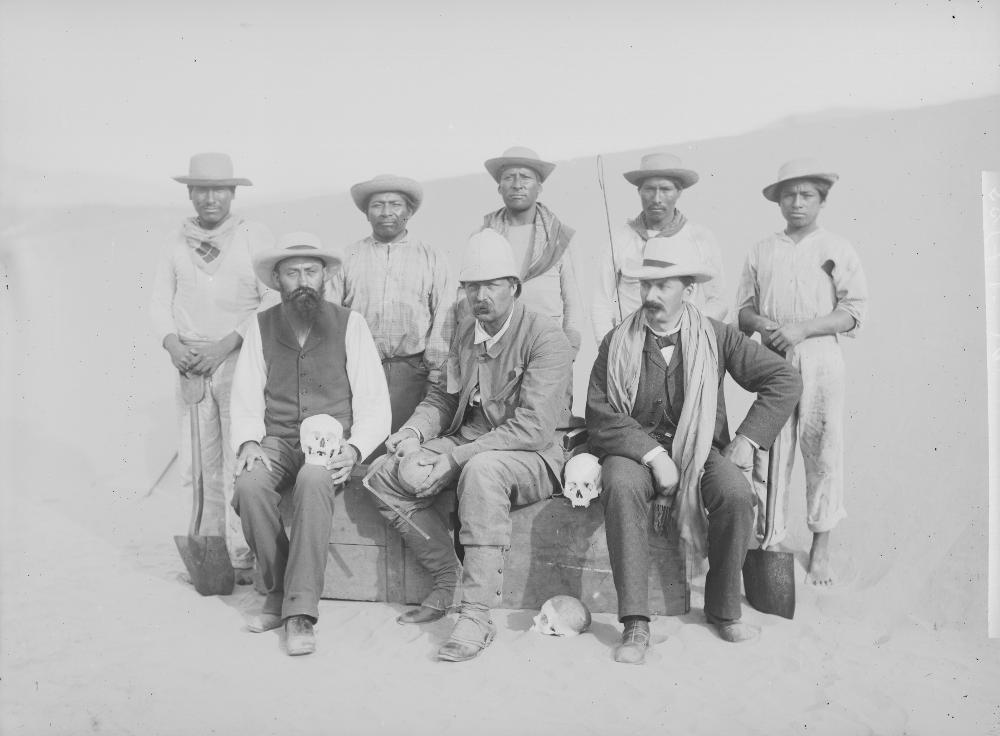
Hjalmar Stolpe during the excavations in Ancon, Peru

On January 23 Vanadis reached Rio de Janeiro. After Brazil the ship continued south to Punta Arenas, Borja Bay, Colombine cove (Newton Island), Molyneux Sound and Green Harbour. On the third of April 1884 Vanadis arrived to Callao, a port town 10 km from Lima, During the time Vanadis visited Lima, Hjalmar Stolpe did excavations at the archaeological site in Ancon. Numerous items at the Museum of Ethnography, Stockholm, are listed as having provenance Ancón. These include five mummies with grave goods, along with surface-collected textiles. This material along with purchases of artifacts Stolpe made in Peru were shipped back to Stockholm.

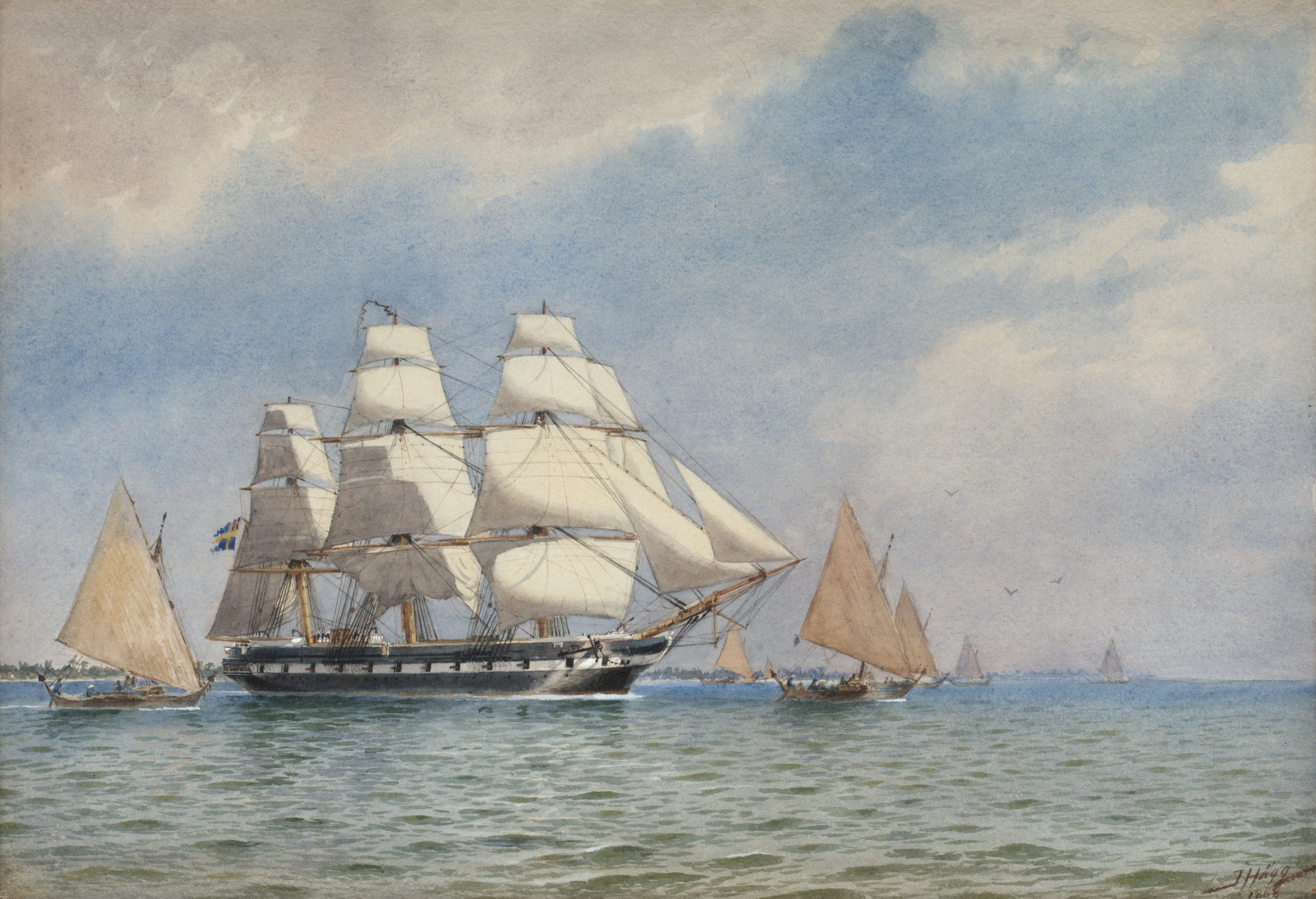
Vanadis approaching Jaluit in 1884. Painting by Jacob Hägg.

== The Pacific ==
Between May and August 1884 Vanadis called at several locations in the Pacific Islands. On May 8–12 they reached the first port, Nuku Hiva in the Marquesas Islands and next stop was Fakarava in the Tuamotu Islands (15–17 May). Tahiti in the Society Islands was next island and here they stopped for almost two weeks (19 May – 2 June), followed by Oahu in the Hawaiian Islands (20 June – 10 July). Captain Lagerberg and the Prince made a visit at the palace and king Kalakaua visited the ship three days later. The prince and a few companions also made a private visit to see Kīlauea volcano. Last stop in the Pacific was Jaluit in the Marshall Islands (26 July - 2 August).

== Japan and Hong Kong (26 August - 29 October) ==
After 3 weeks at sea Vanadis arrived to Japan and first stop was Yokohama. It was time to look through the ship and make sure it was alright. There was also time for a very short audience with Emperor Meiji in Tokyo. During their time in Japan they also experienced a very severe typhoon.

== Philippines (1–6 November) ==
When Vanadis got to Manila, the reception was overwhelming. At the time the Philippines was part of the Spanish Empire and the Spanish governor wanted to make an impression on the Swedish Crown Prince. He succeeded, since Crown Prince Oscar was surprised by all the dinners, parties, excursions, flags and decorations in Swedish colours and fireworks that was arranged for them.

Hjalmar Stolpe wanted to use the time to collect ethnographica from the locals. He hired a boat but after just a few hours at sea there was technical problems and they were forced back to land close to the village Cabeaben in the Mariveles mountains. Here they met people and Ekholm took about 20 photographs and Stolpe documented tattoos and managed to get hold of 80 objects, most of them from the boat trip to Mariveles.

== Bangkok (17–22 November) ==
Ten days after Vanadis left Manila they reached Bangkok in Siam (Thailand). They were met by the royal ship HMS Vesatri and the Swedes went over to Vesatri where they were welcomed by the ship's Danish captain Andreas du Plessis de Richelieu and his younger brother Lieutenant Louis du Plessis de Richelieu. The voyage into Bangkok went past what the crew experienced as very exotic landscapes and then up the Chao Phraya River. On board lunch was served with the entertainment of a forty-strong orchestra and after five hours moored the yacht at the Grand Palace. By then it had already become dark.

The company received a warm reception from Prince Bhanurangsi Savangwongse, who made wagons available to them, and they were driven to the Prince's Palace (Saranrom) where most of them would spend the night.

The most important event was the audience with the king, Chulalongkorn. Commander Otto Lagerberg, Prince Oscar and the other officers received an invitation and after the usual honors, there was entertainment and display of the Grand Palace and Wat Phra Kaeo.

The visit was only a few days but during this time Stolpe managed to collect a collection through gifts from officials they met but also through buying every day objects at the bazaars.

== Singapore (28 November – 3 December) ==
Vanadis reached Singapore on 28 November. This was a relatively short stop. Ekholm managed to take several portraits of various people from the area and Stolpe met Wilhelm von Malein, a Russian who spoke Swedish. With the help of Malein Stolpe bought objects that originated from Java, Borneo and Malacca.

== India (16 December 1884 – February 1885) ==
Unfortunately, there was a clash of characters between Hjalmar Stolpe, the expedition ethnographer, and the ship's captain, Otto Lagerberg, and when the Vanadis reached Calcutta in December 1884, Stolpe left the expedition, arranged for permits to travel through northern India and Kashmir for three months, and made his own arrangements for the return trip to Sweden. During his time in India Stolpe collected many ethnographical objects with the aim of providing ‘a far richer picture of the northern Indian people’s way of life and cultural position’.

== Africa (February–March 1885) ==
On their way from India Vanadis stopped at Aden, Jemen. Svante Natt och Dag tells in his book about Aden that "all there is to say is that we arrived, stopped and left". On 20 February 1885, the ship entered Massawa, Eritrea. Here they saw Italian soldiers and they also met Swedish missionaries and visited their missionary station. The missionaries also visited Vanadis and had lunch on the ship and on 25 February they left Massawa. In the beginning of March they reached Suez Canal and Port Said, Egypt. Next stop was Alexandria on the 11th. Svante Natt och Dag tells in his book about a trip to Kairo and the pyramids that a little group from the ship did the next day, amongst others the Crown Prince, Captain Lagerberg and Oscar von Heidenstam who was Swedish consul-general in Alexandria at the time. During this trip they also visited the khedive of Egypt, Tewfik Pasha.

== Malta and Sweden (March–May 1885) ==
On 24 March Vanadis anchored at Valetta, Malta. Here they met consul-general Olof Fredrik Gollcher who arranged for the Crown Prince and a few others to visit the theatre. After four days at Malta Vanadis continued towards Gibraltar which they reached on 11 April. Last stop on their way before Stockholm was Karlskrona and on the 9th of May Vanadis anchored in Stockholm.
