= 1877 Saint Barthélemy status referendum =

- October 1877
- Return of Saint Barthélemy to France possession

Results
Choice	Votes	%
Yes	350	99.72%
No	1	0.28%
Total votes	351	100.00%

A referendum on re-integration into France was held in the Swedish colony of Saint Barthélemy in October 1877. The island had been a colonial possession of Sweden since Sweden acquired it from France in 1784, but the unprofitability of the island led to Sweden to attempt to sell it. France bought the island from the Swedish and the referendum, in which only one person voted against the proposal, supported the transfer.

== Background ==
Saint Barthélemy was established as a French colony in 1648, but was sold to Sweden in 1784. The island lacked a natural source of fresh water and its economy was based on the free port of Gustavia, which was in decline due to a lack of European wars as the 19th century progressed. The Swedish made multiple unsuccessful attempts to sell their colony due to its unprofitability before reselling it to the French in 1877, for 80,000 francs.

Governor Bror Ludvig Ulrich had one Catholic priest manage the referendum. The island had a population of 2,374 at the time, with 617 being males between the ages of 15 and 60. 351 voters participated in the referendum. All but one person, Wellington Sicard according to Aftonbladet, voted in favour of being transferred to French control.

== Results ==
Choice	Votes	%
For	350	99.72
Against	1	0.28
Total	351	100.00

== Aftermath ==
The treaty between France and Sweden was signed on 10 August 1877, and ratified on 2 March 1878. The treaty was approved by the Chamber of Deputies with a vote of 425 to 8 and by the Senate without opposition. The transfer ceremony was held on 15 March 1878. The island was placed under the administrative control of Guadeloupe and maintained that status until the 2003 Guadeloupean autonomy referendum.

== See also ==
- 1868 Danish West Indies status referendum
- 1870 Dominican Republic annexation referendum

== Works cited ==
=== Books ===
- Rait, R. (1920). Plebiscite and Referendum (PDF). The Stationery Office.

=== Journals ===
- Hennessey, John (2023). "Cutting colonial losses: imperial ideology in media coverage of the 1878 transfer of Saint Barthélemy in Sweden and France". Scandinavian Journal of History. 49 (1). Taylor & Francis: 46–68. doi:10.1080/03468755.2023.2211981.
- Tingbrand, Per (2002). "A Swedish Interlude in the Caribbean" (PDF). Naval Forum. Maritime History Society: 64–92.

=== Web ===
- "Outlook for Saint-Barthélemy" (PDF). Institut d'Émission des Départements d'Outre-Mer. Archived (PDF) from the original on 2 December 2021.
- "Saint Barthelemy". The World Factbook. Archived from the original on 22 June 2025.
