= 1870 Dominican Republic annexation referendum =

Referendum in the Dominican Republic

- February 19, 1870

Results
Choice	Votes	%
For	15,695	99.93%
Against	11	0.07%
Total votes	15,706	100.00%
Registered voters/turnout	52,353	30%

A referendum on annexation by the United States was held in the Dominican Republic on 19 February 1870. The proposal was approved by 99.93% of voters, although turnout was just 30%. However, the United States Senate rejected the annexation on 30 June 1870 with a 28–28 vote.

== Background ==
The Dominican Republic originally became independent from Haiti in 1844 following the War of Independence. However, in 1861 the country was occupied by Spain following an inflation crisis. In 1865 the country became independent again following the Restoration War.

By 1870 the country had significant debts caused by the ongoing Six Years' War. President Buenaventura Báez planned on selling the Samaná Peninsula to the United States for $1.1 million, whilst US President Ulysses S. Grant wanted to annex the entire country. A treaty was signed between the two countries on 29 November 1869. The US would purchase the Dominican Republic for $1.5 million and would lease the Samaná Peninsula for $147,229.91 for 99 years.

On 16 February Báez ordered a referendum to be held in the form of a register. Eleven votes were registered as "against", in the final referendum results.

== Results ==
Choice	Votes	%
For	15,695	99.93
Against	11	0.07
Total	15,706	100.00
Registered voters/turnout		30
Source: Direct Democracy

== See also ==
- Proposed United States annexation of Santo Domingo
- 1868 Danish West Indies status referendum
- 1877 Saint Barthélemy status referendum
