= John Robson (canoeist) =

British canoe sailor

John Robson is a British canoe sailor.

Robson became the 2008 World Champion in the asymmetric kite fleet event by finishing in front of German Tobias Kunz and fellow Brit Peter McLaren.

== Career highlights ==
2008
Port Phillip Bay, (gold) 1st, World Championships Canoe Sailing, Asymmetric Kite Fleet
