= Berndt Robert Gustaf Stackelberg =

Swedish military officer and diplomat

Berndt Robert Gustaf Stackelberg (12 January 1784 in Turku County, Finland – 10 November 1845 in Stockholm, Sweden) was a Swedish military officer and diplomat. Stackelberg was governor of the Swedish colony of St. Barthélemy in the West Indies 1812–1816, and chargé d'affaires of Sweden's diplomatic mission to the United States, 1819–1831.

== Early life ==
Stackelberg was born as the second son of Berndt Magnus Stackelberg (1755–1815) and his first wife Baroness Ottiliana Ulrica De Geer af Tervik (1760–1798). The father was then an officer in the Turku County Infantry Regiment. Stackelberg followed in his father's footsteps and joined the army. In 1800 he was commissioned cornet in the Life Guards of Horse and was promoted to lieutenant in 1805. Stackelberg distinguished himself in the Battle of Sävar in 1809 where he was wounded in action, and was brevetted major and appointed assistant adjutant general. Later that year he became a knight of the Order of the Sword and commissioned major in the Scanian Carabineer Regiment. Stackelberg was brevetted lieutenant colonel in 1811.

== Governor of St. Barthélemy ==
Stackelberg served as governor of the Swedish colony of St. Barthélemy in the West Indies from 14 February 1812 to 20 October 1816.

== Swedish chargé d'affaires in Washington ==
Having returned to Sweden, Stackelberg resigned his commission in the Scanian Carabineers. Brevetted colonel in 1818 and commissioned colonel of the General Staff in 1819, he was the following year he appointed Swedish chargé d'affaires in Washington. Subsequently promoted to adjutant-general 1828 while in diplomatic service. He presented his credentials in Washington on 14 November 1819 and took leave from 6 June 1832.

== Family life ==
Stackelberg remained unmarried and died on 10 November 1845 in Stockholm, Sweden.

Political offices
Preceded by Hans Henrik Anckarheim	Governor of Saint Barthélemy; 1812–1816	Succeeded by Johan Samuel Rosensvärd
