= HSwMS Vanadis =

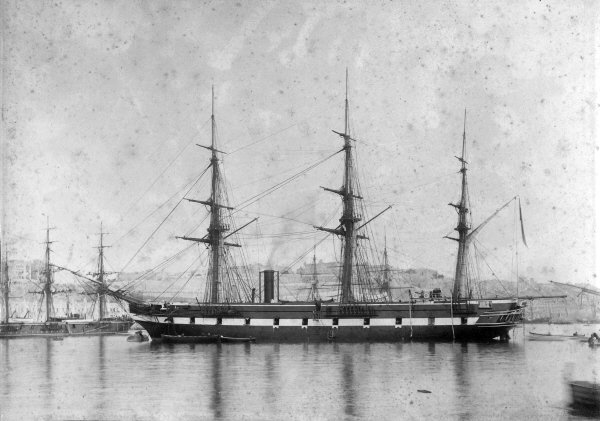
- Vanadis in the harbour of Valletta (date unknown)

History

Sweden
- Name: Vanadis
- Builder: Karlskrona Yard
- Launched: 30 April 1862
- Commissioned: 6 August 1862
- Decommissioned: 1939

General characteristics
- Displacement: 2138 tons
- Length: 64.8 m (212.60 ft)
- Beam: 12.8 m (41.99 ft)
- Draft: 5.2 m (17.06 ft)
- Speed: 11.5 knots (21.30 km/h) (with engine)
- Complement: 316 men
- Armament: As built: 1 × 68 mm gun; 22 × 202 mm Paixhans guns; 1 x 122 mm carronade

HSwMS Vanadis was a steam frigate of the Swedish Navy. She was the only steam frigate constructed for the Swedish Navy, and commissioned in 1862. In 1883–1885 Vanadis was sent on a scientific circumnavigation of Earth, the Vanadis expedition. In 1894 Vanadis was converted to a barracks ship, and decommissioned in 1939. At the outbreak of World War II, she was again requisitioned as a depot ship. Having sunk in 1941, she was salvaged and sold for scrap in 1943.

== History ==
Funds for the construction of Vandis were granted in 1858, and construction started the following year. Vanadis was the only steam frigate constructed for the Swedish Navy in the 19th century. The ship was mainly used as a training ship, and the armament was changed four times in order to train artillery officers on the latest types of cannons.

Vanadis also undertook several long journeys, and was present at the inauguration of the Suez Canal in 1869. The ship was also dispatched to collect Bror Ludvig Ulrich, the last governor of the Swedish colony of Saint Barthélemy, and other Swedes from the island in March 1878. In 1883–1885 Vanadis undertook a scientific circumnavigation of Earth, known as the Vanadis expedition.

Vanadis remained classified as a fighting ship and a frigate until 1894, when she left active service and was thereafter used as a barracks ship, first in Karlskrona and from the 1920s in Stockholm. Vanadis was decommissioned in 1939 but after the outbreak of World War II used as a depot ship at Fjäderholmarna close to Stockholm. In 1941 the ship sank after being too heavily loaded, and though salvaged she was finally sold for scrap in 1943.
