= Simon Allen =

New Zealand cricketer (born 1983)

Simon Rodney Allen
Personal information
- Born: 5 September 1983 (age 41); Wellington, New Zealand
- Source: ESPNcricinfo, 13 December 2016

Simon Allen (born 5 September 1983) is a New Zealand cricketer. He played six List A matches for Wellington between 2007 and 2009. He was also part of New Zealand's squad for the 2002 Under-19 Cricket World Cup.
