= International Canoe =

Canoe racing class

Boat
- Crew: 1
- Draft: 1.00 m (3 ft 3 in)

Hull
- Hull weight: 50 kg (110 lb)
- LOA: 5.18 m (17.0 ft)

Sails
- Spinnaker area: 22 m^{2} (240 sq ft)
- Upwind sail area: 10 m^{2} (110 sq ft)

The International Canoe (IC) (also known as the International Ten Square Meter Sailing Canoe) is a single-handed sailing canoe whose rules are governed by the International Canoe Federation.

The boat has a narrow bow entry and a planning hull, carrying a mainsail, and a jib (sometimes self tacking). Stability is achieved with a sliding seat on which the single crew member sits, effectively controlling the boat from 'outside'.

International Canoes are raced in three divisions. The main body of the class competes to a development (or "box") rule, allowing significant variation in design between different boats within the rule framework.

Within that rule there is a "One Design" subclass which covers boats built to a one design rule in operation between 1971 and 2007, all of which have the same hull shape and are subject to an 83 kg minimum weight limit. The third division, known as the AC (Asymmetric Canoe), uses thInternational Canoee 83 kg one design hull and carries an asymmetrical spinnaker.

The combination of the hull design, sail plan, and the single crew member positioned away from the hull centerline results in a monohull craft that is technically demanding to sail.

The origins of the class can be traced back to the 1860s, and International competition with craft that are recognizably ancestors of the current boats started in 1884. The Class still competes for the New York Canoe Club Challenge Trophy, which was established in 1885 and is believed to be the oldest international sailing trophy after the America's Cup.

The class is most popular in Australia, the US and Northern Europe, especially Germany, Sweden and the UK.

International Canoes can compete against other classes in a mixed fleet by use of the RYA Portsmouth Yardstick handicap scheme. The one-design class uses a Portsmouth number of 905. The Asymmetric Canoe has a faster Portsmouth number of 870, making it 3.9% faster.
