= Canoe sailing =

Sailing by fitting a sail to a canoe

Canoe sailing refers to the practice of fitting an Austronesian outrigger or Western canoe with sails.

== Austronesian sailing canoes ==
The outrigger canoe was one of the key technological innovations of the Austronesian peoples. Although there is little archaeological evidence due to perishable building materials, comparative reconstructions indicate that Austronesians already had the distinctive outrigger and crab claw sail technology from at least 2000 BCE. These boats (as well as derivative technologies like the catamaran) enabled them to colonize the islands of Southeast Asia and then later on to Madagascar, the Pacific Islands, and New Zealand.

Outrigger canoes like the va'a, paraw, jukung, vinta, and proa are still used today by traditional fishermen and traders in most of Southeast Asia and Madagascar, and in parts of Oceania. They are constructed from traditional materials, though most incorporate motor engines instead of a sail.

In other regions like Hawaii, Tahiti, and New Zealand, outrigger canoes are generally restricted to sport sailing and racing. Modern sailing outrigger canoes are usually made from glass-reinforced and carbon fiber-reinforced polymer, with sails made from Dacron and Kevlar.

Hōkūleʻa is a modern interpretation of a Polynesian voyaging canoe. It is made from modern materials such as fibreglass, plywood, resin glue, terylene sails and ropes with modern fittings and safety equipment. In contrast with smaller outrigger canoes meant to stay within sight of land, Hōkūleʻa and other double hulled canoes are large and capable seagoing vessels typically in excess of 40 feet in length. A wide array of these double hulled or voyaging canoe are documented in ethnohistoric sources which note a wide variety in size, hull shape, rigging style, and aesthetics. These large voyaging canoes are the main mechanism by which the wider Pacific Ocean was first peopled and in their modern capacity often serve as educational tools both preserving and communicating ancient voyaging techniques. While Hōkūleʻa is undoubtedly the most famous Austronesian sailing canoe, there are many other examples across the Pacific.

== Modern sailing canoes ==
John MacGregor of Scotland is generally believed to have developed the first modern sailing canoes. During the 1860s, he had at least seven boats built that he called Rob Roys and sailed and paddled them in Europe, the Baltic and the Middle East. He also wrote a book which popularized the design and the concept: "in walking you are bounded by every sea and river, and in a common sailing-boat you are bounded by every shallow and shore; whereas, ...a canoe [can] be paddled or sailed, or hauled, or carried over land or water" (1000 Miles in the Rob Roy Canoe).

MacGregor founded the British Royal Canoe Club (RCC) in 1866.

The New York Canoe Club followed about six years later.

The American Canoe Association (ACA) was founded in 1880. In 1883, ACA Secretary Charles Neide and retired sea captain “Barnacle” Kendall paddled and sailed over three thousand miles from Lake George, New York to Pensacola, Florida.

In 1886 the ACA and the RCC held the first international canoe sailing regatta. Swedish naval officer Carl Smith did much to promote canoe sailing in Scandinavia; he also designed several types of sailing canoes.

In 1991 American Howard Rice sailed and paddled a sailing canoe solo around Cape Horn, Chile considered historically to be the Mount Everest of sailing challenges. He was awarded a Certificate of Merit by the Chilean Navy and inducted into the Cape Horners Society.

There are several racing classes of sailing canoes: Cruising Class or 4 Meter, C Class or 5 Meter, International Decked Sailing Canoe, and the American Canoe Association Class.

== See also ==
- Log canoe, a type of sailboat used in the Chesapeake Bay region
- Periagua, an 18th-century term for sailing canoes in the Caribbean
