= Carl Fredrik Bagge af Söderby =

Swedish military officer and colonial administrator (1750–1828)

Governor of Saint Barthélemy
- In office 6 June 1790 – 17 November 1795
- Monarchs: Gustav III; Gustav IV Adolf
- Preceded by: Pehr Herman Rosén von Rosenstein
- Succeeded by: Georg Henrik Johan af Trolle

Personal details
- Born: 23 October 1750 Järpås, Sweden
- Died: 31 December 1828 (aged 78) Colombier, Swedish Saint Barthélemy
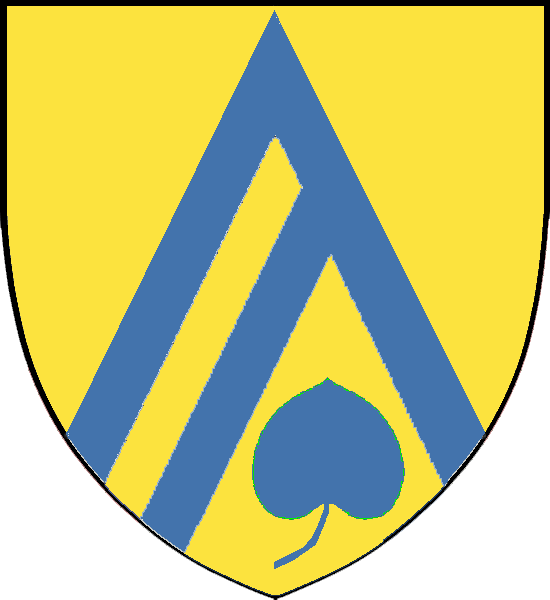
- Coat of Arms
- Awards: Order of the Sword

Carl Fredrik Bagge af Söderby (October 23, 1750 – December 31, 1828) was a Swedish military officer and colonial administrator who served as governor of Saint Barthélemy from 1790 to 1795, the only Swedish colony at the time.

== Biography ==
Bagge was born in Järpås, Västergötland, to Jean Georg Bagge af Söderby, an army major, and his wife Maria Sofia Juliana (née Friedenreich). The family belonged to the untitled nobility. He travelled with an East Indiaman as a non-commissioned officer to Guangzhou in 1765–66. He was later promoted to lieutenant of the Admiralty in 1773 and awarded the Order of the Sword in 1783.

In 1786, Bagge first arrived in Saint Barthélemy on the merchant brig Antonetta and was soon appointed harbour master by governor Rajalin. At this time, he had also attained the rank of captain of the Admiralty.

=== Governor of Saint Barthélemy ===
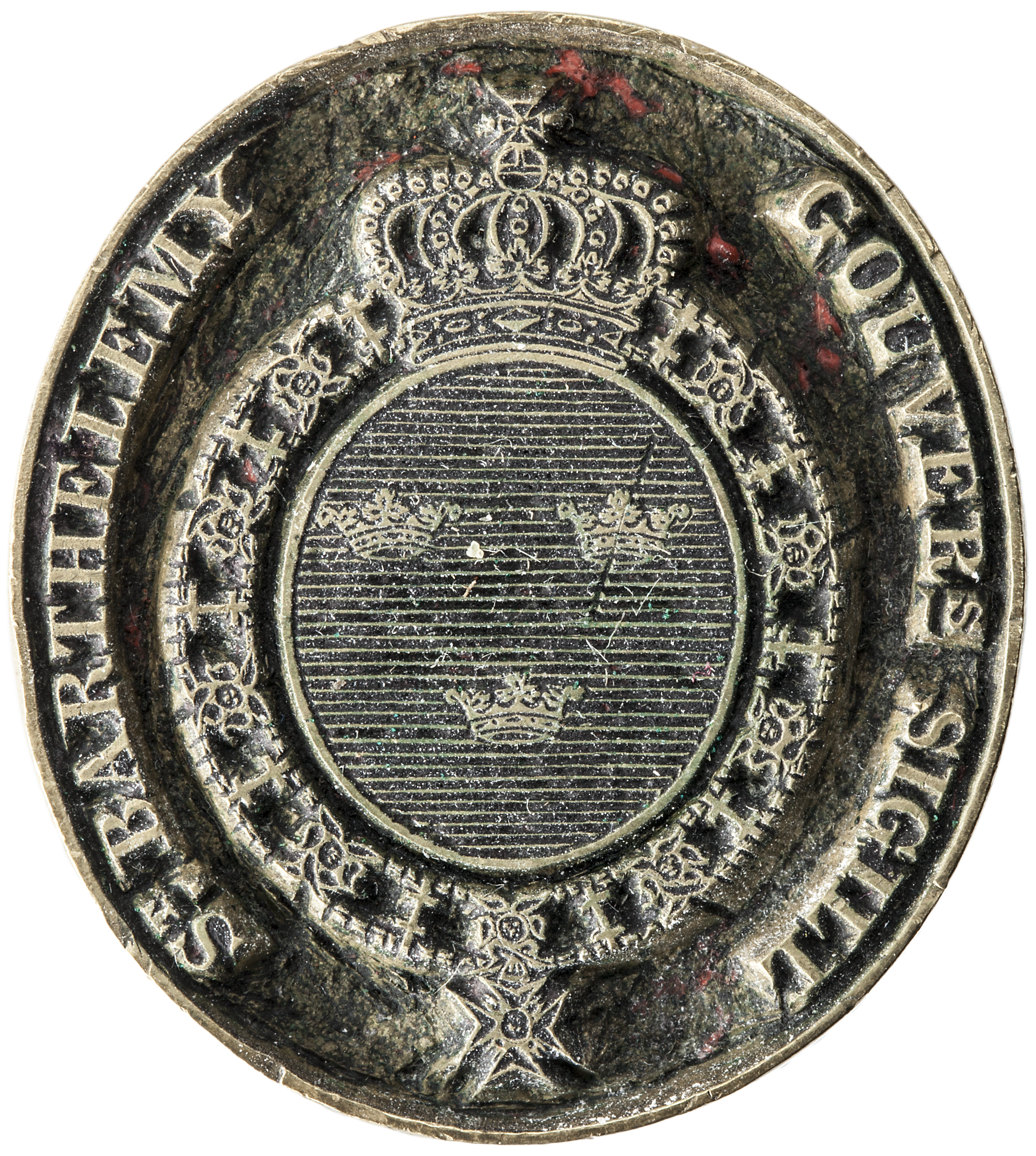
Seal of the Swedish governor of Saint Barthélemy, 1784–1878.

Bagge was appointed governor on 3 February 1790 and formally took up his duties on 6 June the same year. He bought land in Colombier, first one and a half carrés in 1792, and a further three carrés in 1794, on which he built an estate called Bellevue. According to a census record from 1796, Bagge was listed as the head of a household consisting of 32 individuals, including 22 slaves. During his governorship, the island witnessed a rapid increase in population as many refugees from the French West Indies arrived, fleeing the turmoil caused by the French Revolution. By 1792, the island had a population of 1,488, compared to only 749 in 1784. This led to increased fear among the Swedish colonial authorities on the island that revolutionary ideas would spread to the colony.

At the same time, the population on the island, especially the Swedes, were considered to hold very Francophile views and allowed the export of ammunition to Guadeloupe after its recapture by Victor Hugues in 1794. The increased French presence on Saint Barthélemy also attracted the attention of the British, who accused Swedish authorities on the island of supplying two French cruisers. Bagge was dismissed as governor in 1795 due to diplomatic pressure Britain exerted on the Swedish government, as they considered him too pro-French. Bagge returned to Sweden in 1800 and became responsible for the defence port in Karlskrona. In 1802, he was allowed to return to Saint Barthélemy and settled down on his estate. He later tried in vain to get reinstated as governor, as well as to be elected to the Conseil de Justice in Gustavia, but he only received one vote.

In the aftermath of the 1810 mutiny, he handed over a letter to governor Anckarheim, which he had supposedly received from Samuel Fahlberg in 1811. The letter would later lay the foundation for the trial against Fahlberg. He was an enthusiastic supporter of Sweden's annexation of Guadeloupe as a colony, when the British temporarily transferred the island to the Swedish Crown between 1813 and 1814. He died after a brief illness on New Year's Eve in 1828 and was buried on his estate. Bagge married Susanna Maria Clarck, a native of Hampshire, England. The marriage was childless, but he fathered several illegitimate children with his coloured handmaids.

Political offices
Preceded by Pehr Herman Rosén von Rosenstein	Governor of Saint Barthélemy; 1790–1795	Succeeded by Georg Henrik Johan af Trolle
