= Samuel Fahlberg =

Swedish colonial civil servant (1758–1834)

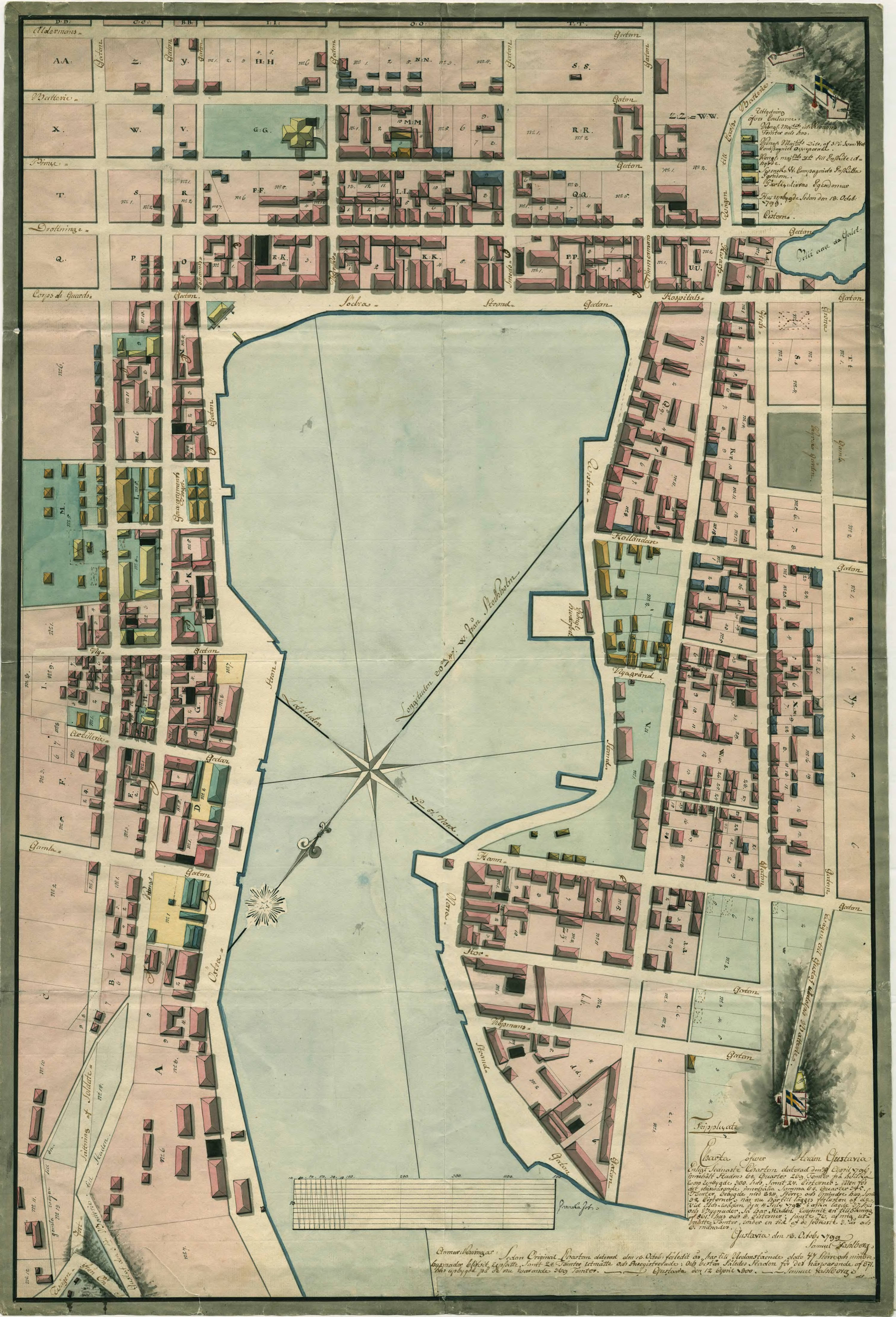
Samuel Fahlberg's map of Gustavia, 1799

Samuel Fahlberg (September 9, 1758 – November 28, 1834) was a Swedish colonial civil servant, cartographer and medical doctor who held various positions within the colonial administration of Saint Barthélemy during its early Swedish period. He later went into exile following his attempts to suppress an uprising in Gustavia and accusations of involvement in a mutiny, actions that subsequently led to him being sentenced to death in absentia.

== Biography ==
Fahlberg was born in Söderala, Hälsingland, to a peasant family and became an orphan at an early age. He eventually came under the patronage of Jakob Tjäder, a surgeon by profession, who took Fahlberg on as an apprentice and trained him in the practice of medicine. In 1782, he enlisted as a ship’s doctor on a trading vessel bound for France, and later served as a naval surgeon aboard a ship in a squadron commanded by Jean-François de La Pérouse. He remained in French service for nearly two years and saw military action during the Hudson Bay expedition, during which he sustained light wounds. Following the end of the American Revolutionary War, he returned to Sweden and took up residence at the Seraphim Hospital in Stockholm.

=== Colonial career ===
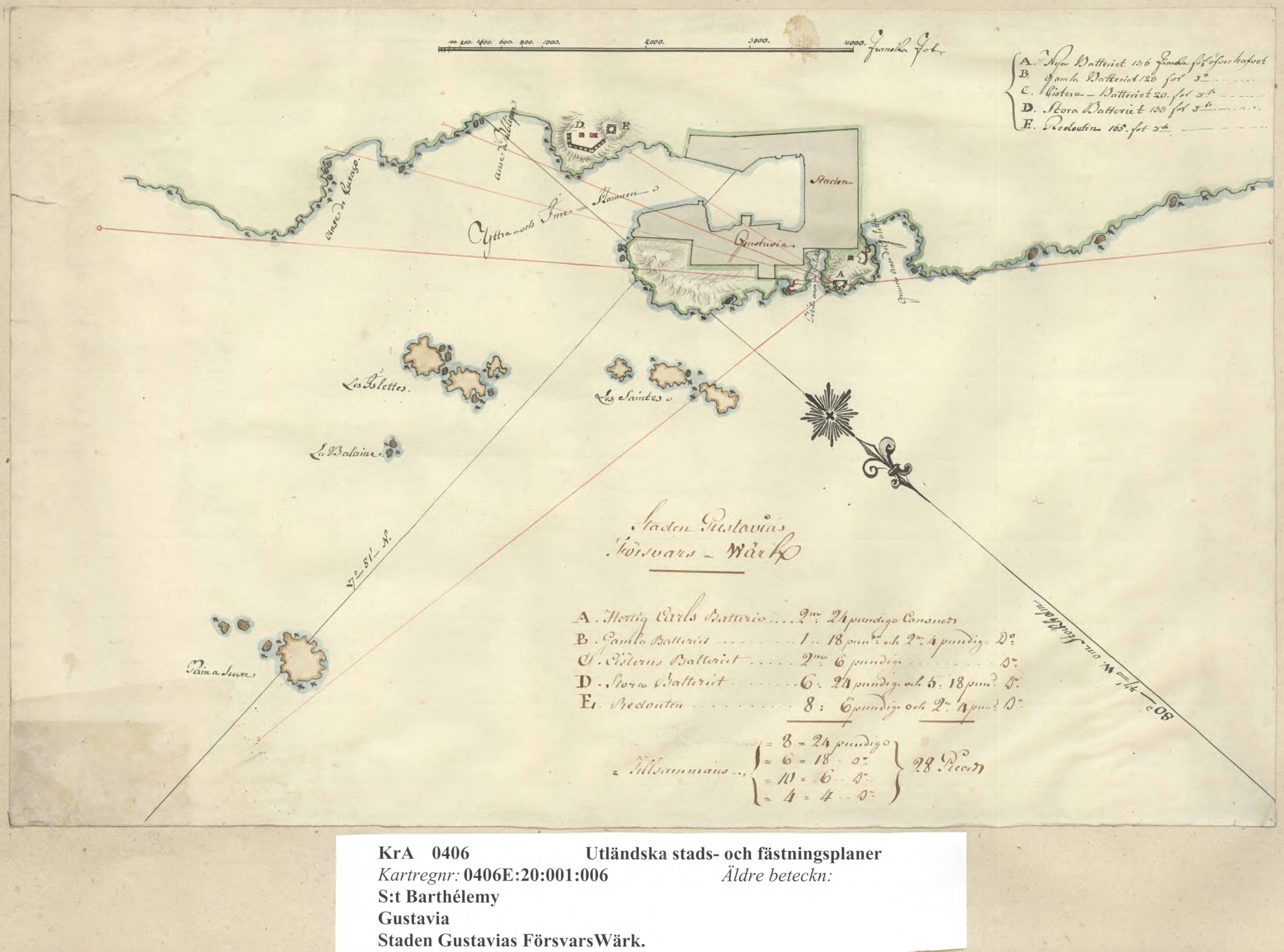
Samuel Fahlberg's drawing of the defensive positions of Gustavia

In 1784, Fahlberg was appointed acting physician and government secretary in the Swedish colony of Saint Barthélemy. He was on board the frigate Sprengporten, which set sail for Saint Barthélemy on 9 December and arrived at the island on 6 March the following year, as part of the first Swedish expedition to the colony. The Caribbean island had been acquired from France by the King of Sweden in exchange for trading privileges in Gothenburg. Fahlberg soon became involved with the Swedish West India Company, serving as a commercial agent on the island. He was also entrusted with responsibilities in urban planning, including drafting the city plan for the colony’s future capital, Gustavia, which was located on a site previously known as Le Carénage by the French settlers. In the 1796 census, he was recorded as the head of a household comprising 16 individuals, including six slaves.

He also dispatched an ethnographic study of the Indigenous peoples of the Caribbean to the Royal Swedish Academy of Sciences, as well as sending plant samples to the Swedish naturalist Carl Peter Thunberg. The latter task earned him a doctorate. In 1801, he became a member of the American Philosophical Society in Philadelphia. Fahlberg made extensive contributions to the cartography of Saint Barthélemy and later to that of the Dutch islands in the Caribbean. His work "Charta öfver ön S:t Barthelemy" is considered to be one of the most important contributions to the cartographic history of the island.

Prior to the British occupation of Saint Barthélemy, Fahlberg served as fortification officer and advised the colonial authorities to capitulate to the British fleet, as the island was deemed impossible to defend.

=== Exile ===
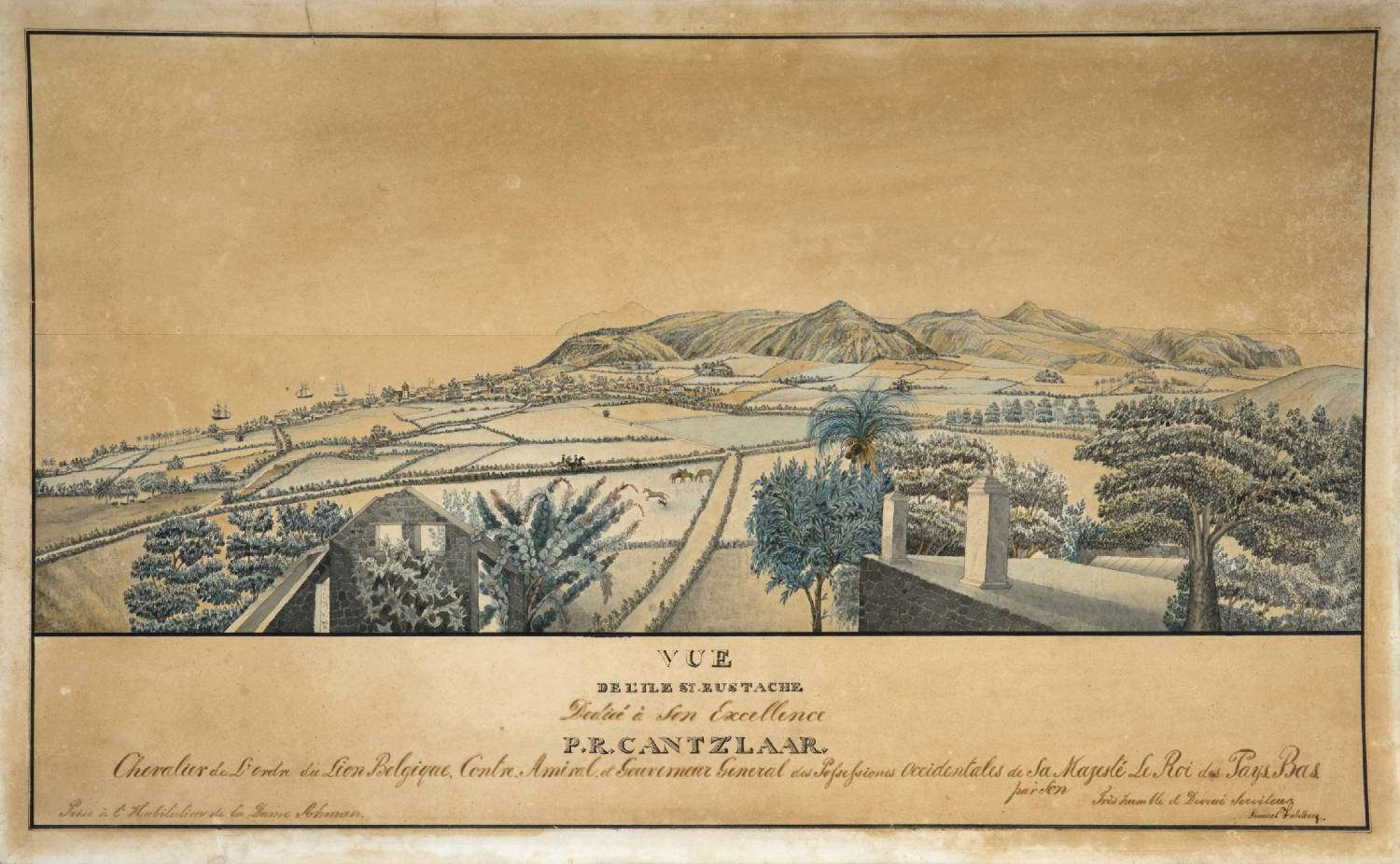
'Vue de l'ile de St.Eustache' Sint Eustatius, watercolor by Samuel Fahlberg, 1820

On 19 September 1810, civil disorders broke out among the white population in Gustavia. The situation worsened after governor Anckarheim ordered the local militias to be disarmed.

The colonial authorities in Gustavia found themselves in a desperate situation, as help from Sweden was unlikely to arrive due to the country's own turmoil following the loss in the Finnish War against the Russian Empire and the unrest caused by the Coup of 1809. Fahlberg was appointed commander of the artillery battalion in the local militia the same day. It was in this capacity that he was rumored to have ordered the guns at Fort Gustav to fire on the mutineers outside the Government House. The events of the uprising and Fahlberg’s exact role in them have never been fully clarified.

According to testimonies given to the vice-justiciary by two Swedish soldiers, sergeant August Nyman and private Peter David, who were stationed at the fort during the mutiny, Fahlberg had ordered the battery to fire on the crowds outside the Government House.

According to Nyman, Fahlberg had approached the fort on horseback together with the Leeward Company from the rural militia. At the fort, he delivered a speech in French, which so upset the militiamen that they threw their rifles to the ground, only to pick them up moments later and disperse back into town. Left alone at the fort, Fahlberg then ordered Nyman to fire on the crowds of mutineers gathered outside the Government House. Nyman refused, citing a lack of men to operate the cannons and the absence of a written order from the governor. Fahlberg reportedly replied that he had orders from the governor. When Nyman asked to see them, Fahlberg claimed he was acting in the governor’s name and had received oral instructions to fire on the mutineers. Nyman still refused. Fahlberg then ordered him to load the lighter 18-pounders with scrap iron, an order Nyman again refused to carry out. Fahlberg subsequently rode back to Gustavia and later sent one of his slaves to the fort with the same orders, which Nyman again declined to follow. Similar statements were made by David, who testified that Nyman had repeatedly refused to follow Fahlberg's orders.

Due to the turmoil of events, and the fact that the local militia had turned Fahlberg into a scapegoat after reaching a settlement with governor Anckarheim, Fahlberg, fearing for his personal safety, had to leave the island on 4 October the same year on the schooner Heidriker, which was bound for Sint Eustatius, where his family later joined him. At the time, he was granted a two-month leave of absence.

Rumors also surfaced about Fahlberg being part of a conspiracy to proclaim the deposed king, Gustav IV Adolf, as sovereign over the island, through an unsigned letter that reached Anckarheim in 1811 and contained plans to declare the island an independent kingdom. The letter was assumed to have been written by Fahlberg and was later used in court as evidence of Fahlberg’s alleged treason. In a letter sent to the court in Gustavia in March 1811, Fahlberg denied all accusations made against him. He further claimed that it would have been impossible for the 18-pounders at Fort Gustav to hit the Government House from their positions.

His case was tried in court on 13 September 1813, where he was found guilty in absentia of high treason by a court in Gustavia. He was declared an outlaw and sentenced to death by decapitation. All of his properties were confiscated, including his slaves, who were subsequently auctioned off.

Meanwhile, in Sint Eustatius, Fahlberg entered Dutch service, working as a garrison physician and once again returning to cartography. He subsequently produced several maps illustrating various locations on Sint Eustatius and other Dutch Caribbean islands. In 1816, he moved with his family to Sint Maarten, where he remained until 1829, when he returned to Sint Eustatius and settled there for good. During his stay at Sint Maarten he befriended the Dutch governor Willem Hendrik Rink, to whom he dedicated several works.

Fahlberg died suddenly on November 28, 1834, unaware that he had been granted a royal pardon just weeks earlier, on October 20. He was buried in Oranjestad, likely in the grave of his second wife, although his name was not engraved on the family tombstone.

== Personal life ==
Fahlberg married twice, first with Elisabeth Sivers from Sint Eustatius in 1791 and then with Elizabeth Evory in 1800. His first marriage was childless. His second wife bore him five children. His two sons died before reaching adulthood, and in 1811, his second wife died on Sint Eustatius. By 1816, only two of his daughters remained, Maria Theresa and Elizabeth, both of whom went on to marry: Maria Theresa to Charles Rey from Saint Martin, and Elizabeth to a plantation owner named Theophile Segnod.

Fahlberg held an interest in herbal medicines used by black populations in the Caribbean and authored several papers on the subject. This interest was also evident in a court case from 1806 concerning black healers and magic, in which Fahlberg participated as a court member. He also conducted experiments on himself with these herbal medicaments.

== Legacy ==
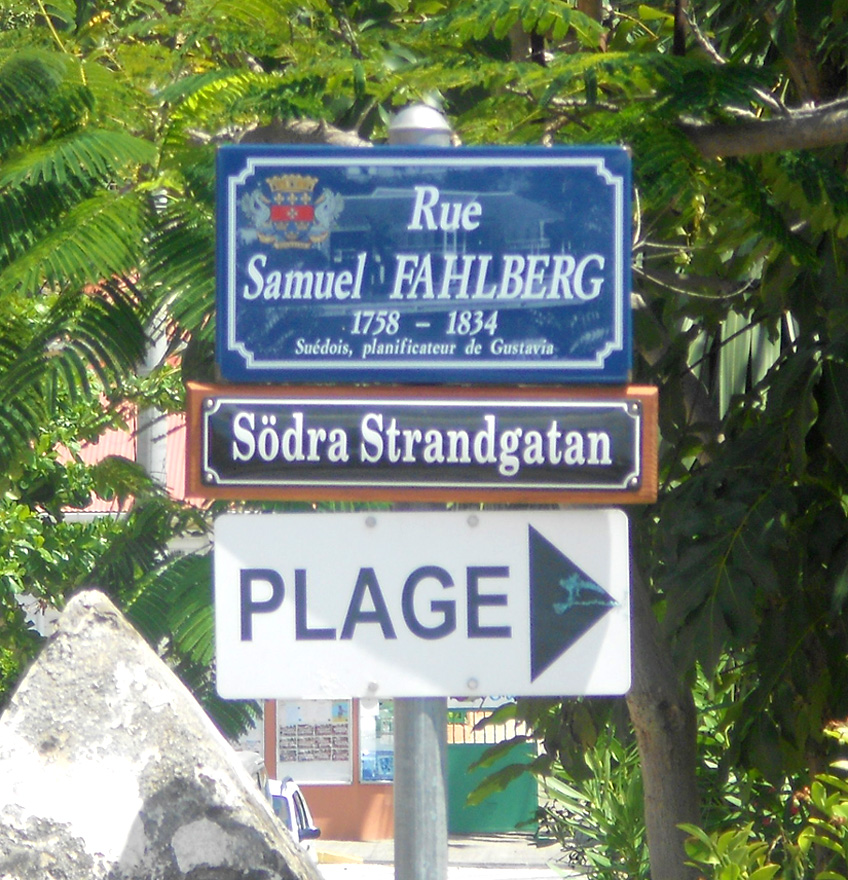
Rue Samuel Fahlberg, Gustavia

A street in Gustavia, Rue Samuel Fahlberg, is named in his honour, making him the only Swede besides August Nyman and king Oscar II to have a street named after him on Saint Barthélemy.

A West African knife brought by Fahlberg was on display during the exhibition "Att väcka föremålen till liv" at the Museum of Ethnography in Stockholm, as one of the few colonial artifacts publicly exhibited in Sweden.

The tortrix moth Cydia fahlbergiana, which was first described by Carl Peter Thunberg, is named after Fahlberg.
