= Saint-Barthélemy Mutiny =

Mutiny on Saint-Barthélemy in 1810

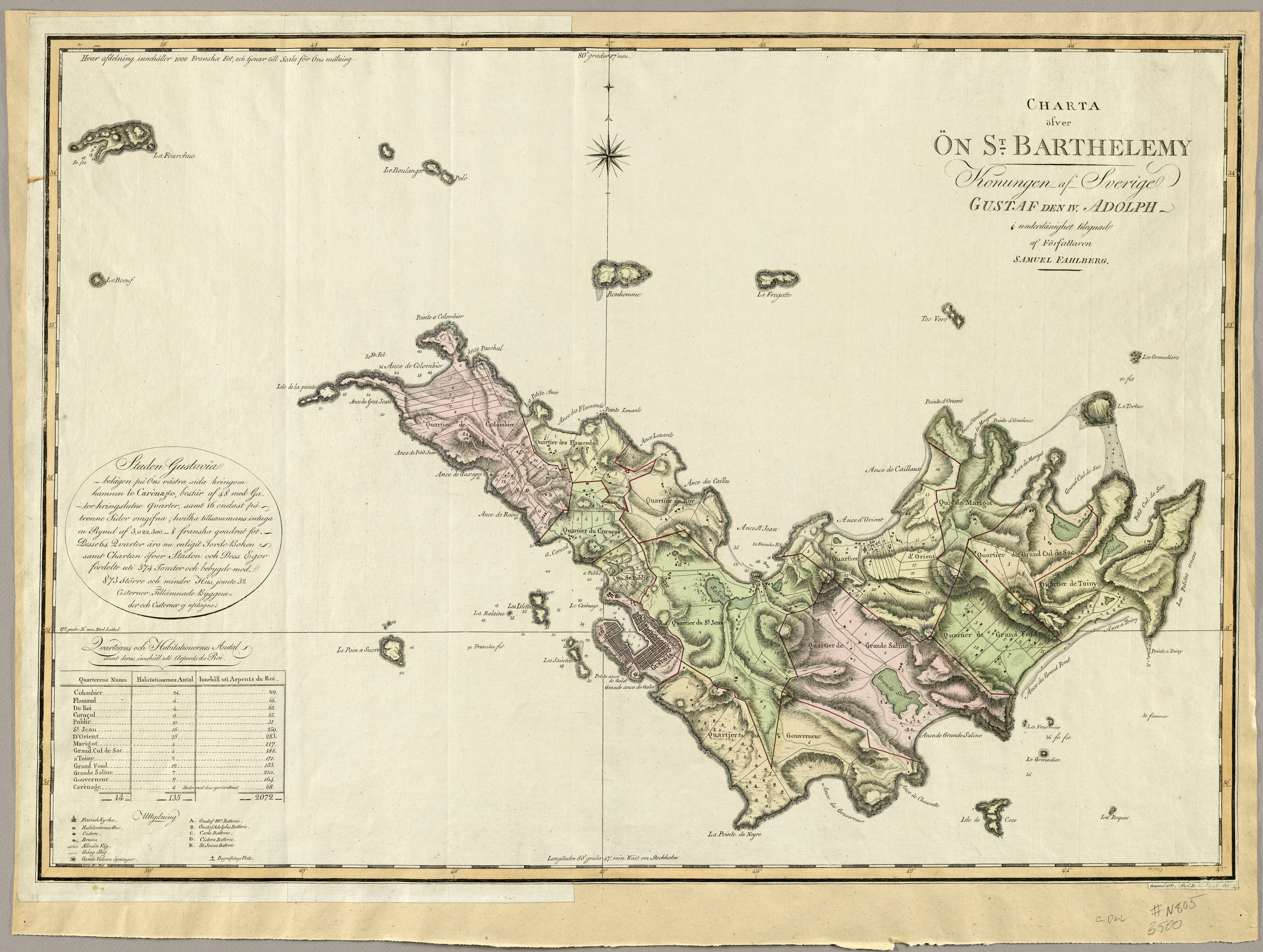
- Engraved and hand-coloured map of St. Barthélemy from 1801
Date	September 22/23 1810
Location	Saint Barthélemy
Result	Mutineer victory
Territorial changes	Sweden temporarily loses control of Saint Barthélemy

Belligerents
(yes) Sweden; Saint Barthélemy	Mutineers

Commanders and leaders
(History of Sweden#19th century) Hans Henrik Anckarheim (POW) (History of Sweden#19th century) Samuel Fahlberg (History of Sweden#19th century) Anders Bergstedt (POW) (History of Sweden#19th century) August Nyman	John Joseph Cremony; Johann Bernard Elbers; Johan Philip Krafft

Units involved
Unknown	Gustavian Militia

Strength
Unknown	Unknown

The Saint-Barthélemy Mutiny was a mutiny against Swedish rule on the then Swedish controlled Saint Barthélemy by the Gustavian Militia.

== Background ==
Monarchs

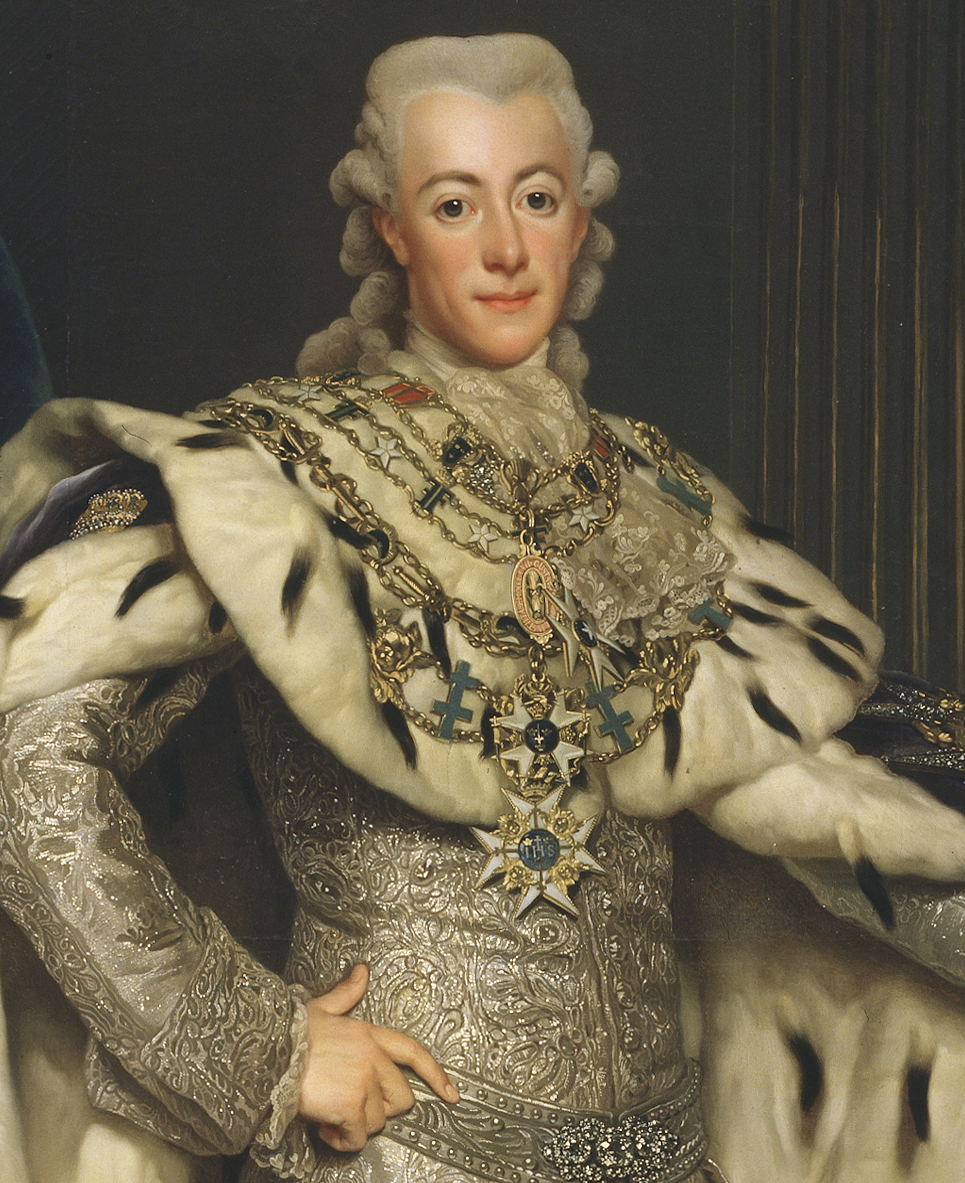
Gustav III, King of Sweden (1771-1792)

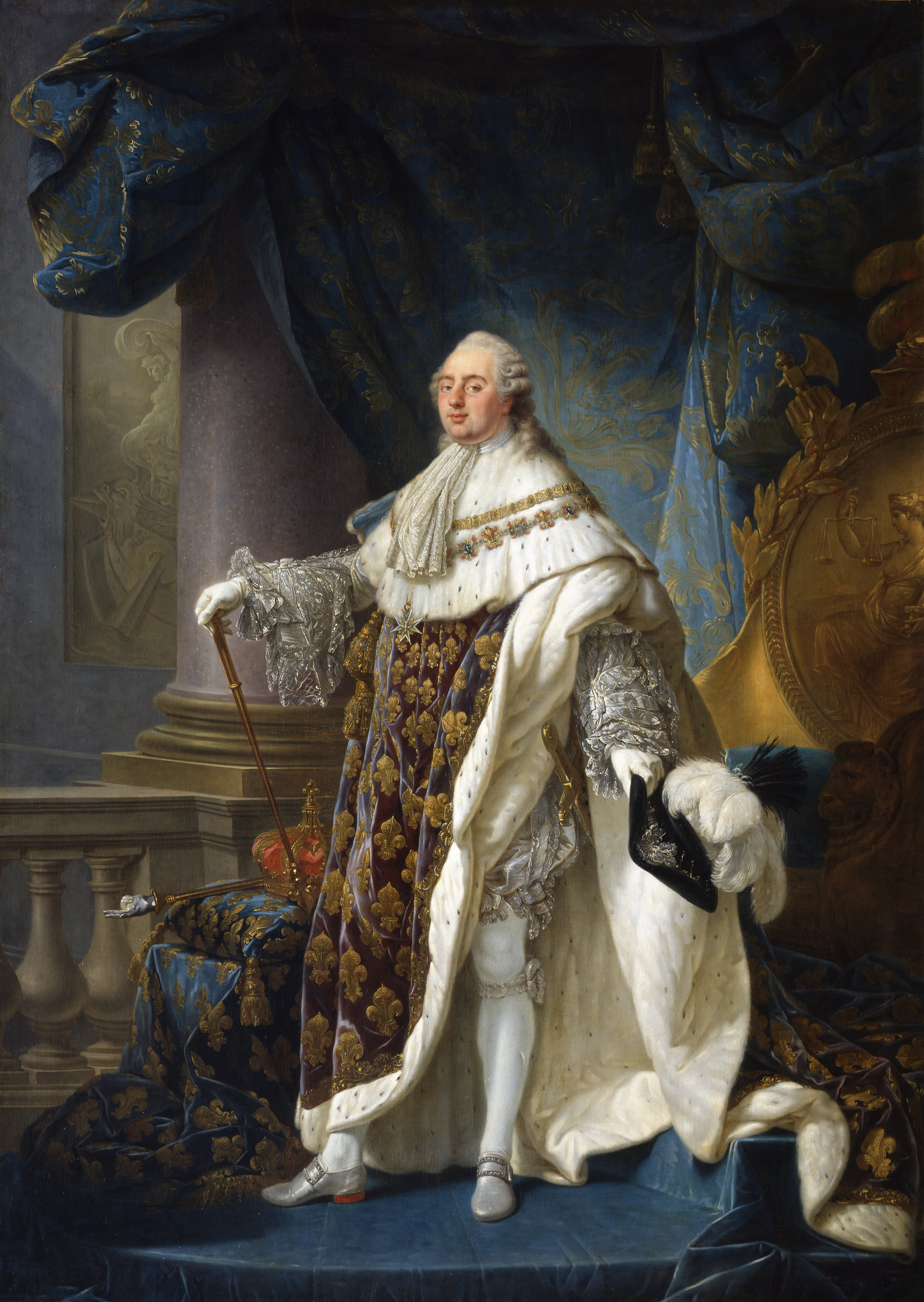
Louis XVI, King of France (1774-1792)

=== Acquisition of Saint-Barthélemy ===
Gustav III had always wanted a Swedish base in the New World, which he finally acquired in a treaty with the French King, Louis XVI on July 1, 1784. Unfortunately for the Swedes, the island had little to offer, with a population of only 739-950 when the ship Enighet arrived in 30 January 1785, The island also lacked clean drinking water and had little fertile ground.

=== Establishment as a free port ===
In 1786, the Swedes made a significant policy change, being the classification of the newly settled Gustavia as a free port. It was modelled after Dutch and Danish predecessors in the region. These predecessors had seen success before, especially during international conflicts, leading to a Swedish interest.

=== French Revolutionary Wars ===
After news of the French Revolution reached the Caribbean in 1789, Many Frenchmen took refuge on neutral islands, including Saint Barthélemy. According to Anne Pérotin-Dumon, a great wave of immigration took place in 1793-1794 by groups of inhabitants from Guadaloupe and Martinique, mainly consisting of royalists and supporters of the revolution. In May 1793, Carl Fredrik Bagge af Söderby, the Governor of Saint Barthélemy, commented on the arrival of French families to the island. On one hand, he disapproved of giving protection to the "foreign adventurers and bankrupt persons", while also welcoming them as they brought "considerable property, slaves, households, and cash."

== Mutiny ==
Gustavia

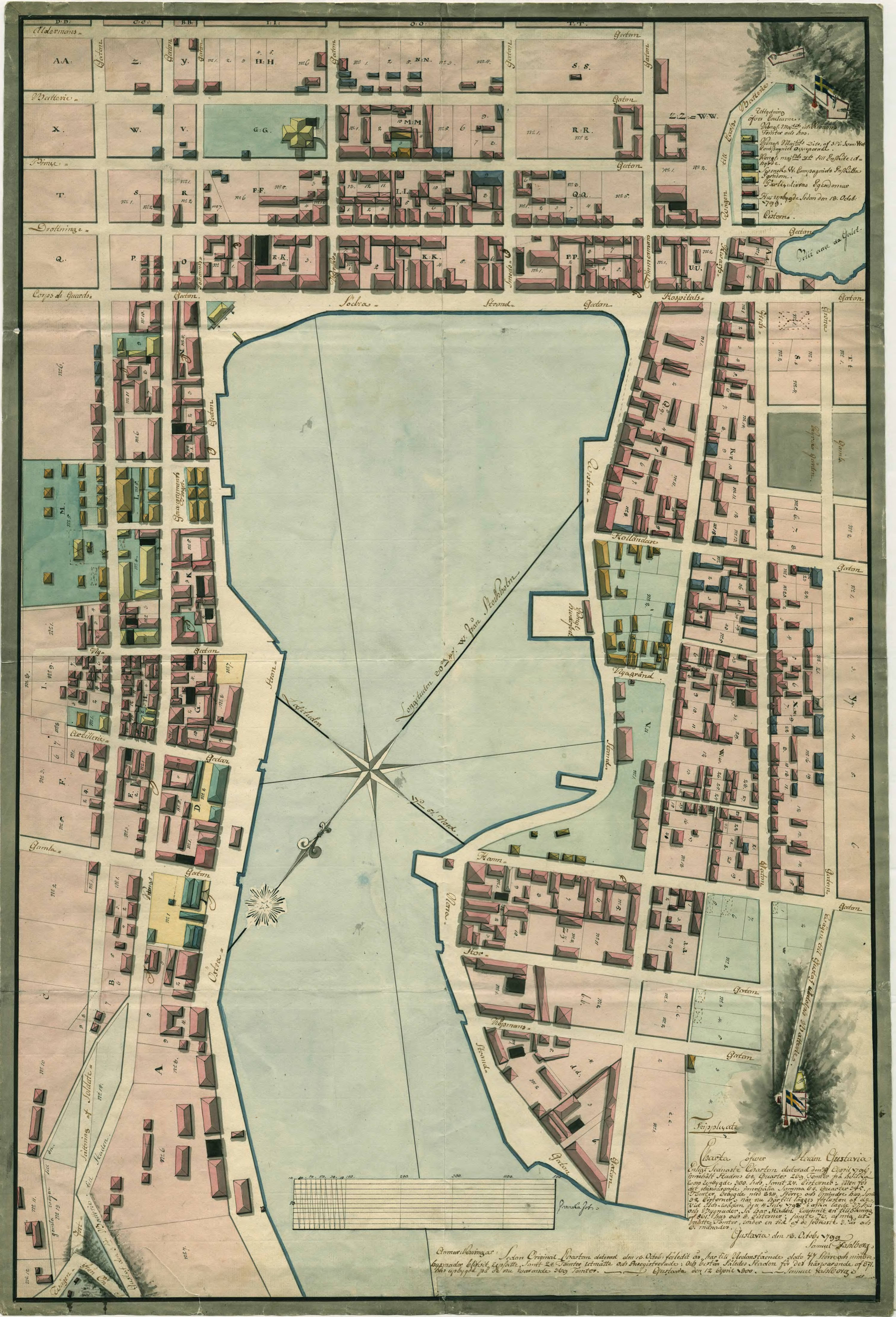
Map of Gustavia in 1799 by Samuel Fahlberg

On September 22, the merchant and mariners in Gustavia took up arms against the Swedish authorities, specifically Governor Hans Henrik Anckarheim, Samuel Fahlberg, and Anders Bergstedt. The motives for the mutineers was initially unclear, other than that they were reacting to Governor Anckarheims order to disband the town militia which he called "unruly, disorganized, and rebellious". Bergstedt was quickly captured by the mutineers, and when Anckarheim heard of the mutiny he ordered Fahlberg to escape to the nearby fortress. Anckarheim, who was suffering from gout, was captured by the mutineers. The mutineers, according to Anckarheim, claimed to have "a thousand reasons for complaints against [Bergstedt] which they humbly wished to put before His Royal Majesty to consider". Later in the evening, after Anckarheim had negotiated with the mutineers, he ordered Fahlberg to not attack the mutineers and return home.

A few days later, August Nyman had claimed that Fahlberg ordered him to fire on the rebellious militia, but that he refused due to them being his own countrymen. Due to the mutiny the Swedes temporarily lost control of the island to the mutineers.

Governor

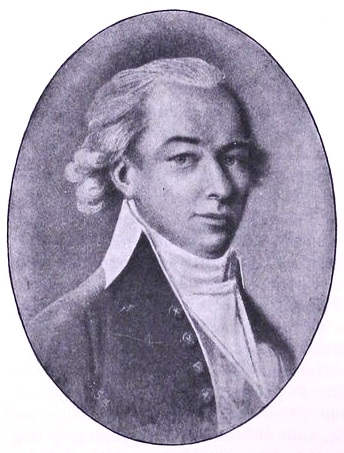
The first governor of Swedish Saint Barthelemy, Salomon von Rajalin (1785–1787)

== Aftermath ==
Due to the mutiny, the demands from the mutineers that Bergstedt was to be exiled was accepted, along with Fahlberg.

== See also ==
- Saint-Barthélemy affair
