= Pehr Herman Rosén von Rosenstein =

Swedish military officer and colonial administrator (1763–1799)

Governor of Saint Barthélemy
- In office 23 April 1787 – 6 June 1790
- Monarch: Gustav III
- Preceded by: Salomon von Rajalin
- Succeeded by: Carl Fredrik Bagge af Söderby

Personal details
- Born: 7 May 1763 Uppsala, Sweden
- Died: 29 September 1799 (aged 36) Vaasa, Finland
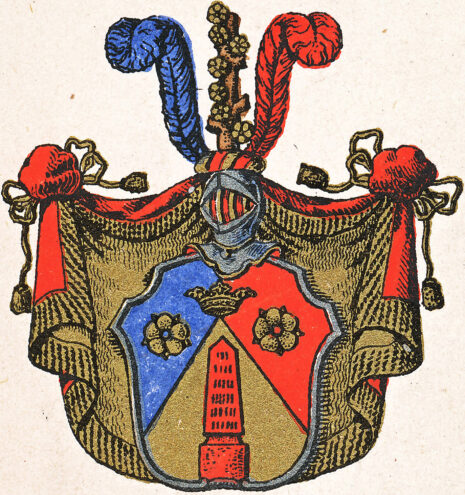
- Coat of Arms
- Awards: Order of the Sword

Pehr Herman Rosén von Rosenstein (May 7, 1763 – September 22, 1799) was a Swedish military officer and colonial administrator who served as governor of Saint Barthélemy from 1787 to 1790, the only Swedish colony at the time.

== Biography ==
Rosenstein was born as the fifth child of Samuel Aurivillius and his wife Anna Margareta. He and his siblings adopted the aristocratic surname of their maternal grandfather, Nils Rosén von Rosenstein. His siblings included Carl von Rosenstein, archbishop of Uppsala, and rear admiral Måns von Rosenstein. He joined the military at an early age and was commissioned as an ensign in the Västerbotten Regiment in 1779. He was later promoted to lieutenant in the regiment.

He was part of the first Swedish expedition to Saint Barthélemy, arriving there aboard the frigate Sprengporten in 1785. The island had been ceded to Sweden by France in 1784 in exchange for trading rights in Gothenburg. He came to serve as aide-de-camp to governor Rajalin. Among his tasks were measuring the land and the habitations on the island. He was appointed vice-commandant of the colony when Rajalin left the island on a leave of absence in April 1787, and was later made governor after Rajalin was appointed governor of Gotland, in the Baltic Sea, later that same year.

=== Governor of Saint Barthélemy ===
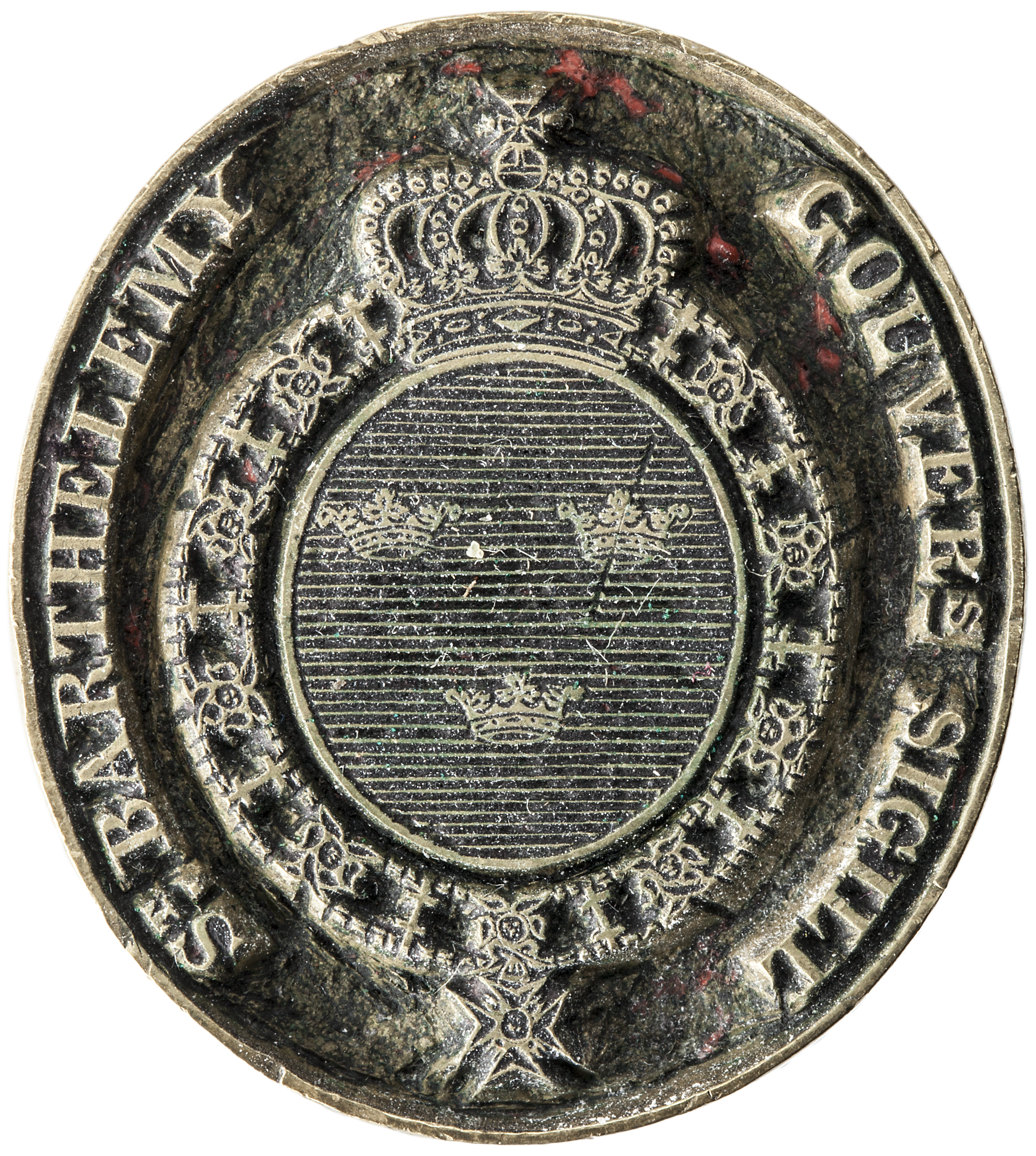
Seal of the Swedish governor of Saint Barthélemy, 1784–1878.

As governor, Rosenstein introduced the Code Noir, or Svarta lagen, a statute that outlined policies and regulations concerning the slaves and the free coloured population of the colony on 30 July 1787. The inhabitants were classified into three categories: whites, black slaves, and free coloureds. The statute also included penalties for both slaves and free coloureds who violated its regulations. It was based on the previous French Code Noir and had been translated to English by his predecessor Rajalin. This statute included giving slave owners the right to punish their slaves with a maximum of 29 strokes with a cane and the death penalty was to be imposed on any slave who assaulted their master. He argued that this statute was a necessity to prevent slave owners from mistreating their slaves and to avoid slave rebellions. Rosenstein also was a supporter of the Atlantic slave trade, which he regarded as the most important enterprise in the West Indies.

Rosenstein also built up a local militia, which was divided into two companies: the Leeward Company and the Windward Company. During the Russo-Swedish War (1788–1790), there were fears that the Russians might attempt to conquer the island and all possible landing beaches were closely monitored.

During his tenure as governor, the first Swedish church on the island was built and named Sophia Magdalena after the Swedish queen. It was inaugurated in 1787 and located on what is today known as Rue Adrien Questel. The church hosted both Protestant and Catholic ceremonies.

Rosenstein returned to Sweden in 1790 and was stationed in Karlskrona before being relocated to Ostrobothnia in 1795. Upon returning to Sweden, he was promoted to major and awarded the Order of the Sword. He fathered a daughter, Anna Lovisa Ulrica, with his mulatto slave Jenny Brozette, both of whom were later granted their freedom. When he departed from the island, he left behind a substantial sum of money and a plot of land in Gustavia, which Jenny acquired. She was recorded in the 1796 census as the head of a household consisting of 11 individuals, including six slaves.

He never married and died in 1799, whereupon his estate was declared bankrupt.

== See also ==
- Swedish slave trade

Political offices
| Preceded by Salomon von Rajalin | Governor of Saint Barthélemy; 1787–1790 | Succeeded by Carl Fredrik Bagge af Söderby |
