= Georg Henrik Johan af Trolle =

Swedish military officer and colonial administrator (1764–1824)

Governor of Saint Barthélemy
- In office 7 November 1795 – 26 January 1801
- Monarch: Gustav IV Adolf
- Preceded by: Carl Fredrik Bagge af Söderby
- Succeeded by: Hans Henrik Anckarheim

Personal details
- Born: 20 April 1764 Karlskrona, Sweden
- Died: 30 December 1824 (aged 60) Stockholm, Sweden
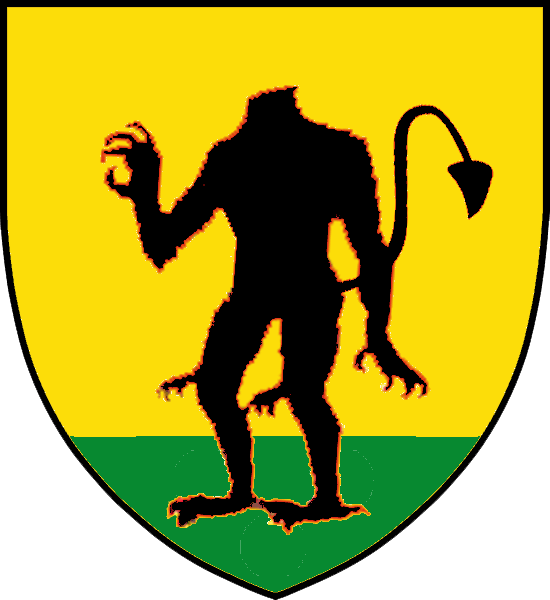
- Coat of Arms

Military service
- Allegiance: Sweden
- Branch/service: Archipelago fleet
- Rank: Lieutenant colonel
- Battles/wars: Surrender of Saint Barthélemy (1801); Swedish–Norwegian War (1814)
- Awards: Order of the Sword

Georg Henrik Johan af Trolle (April 20, 1769 – December 30, 1824) was a Swedish military officer and colonial administrator who served as governor of Saint Barthélemy from 1795 to 1801, the only Swedish colony in the West Indies at the time.

== Biography ==
Born to Johan af Trolle, a captain of the Admiralty, and his wife Juliana Sidonia (née Faber). The family belonged to the untitled nobility. He became an ensign in the Archipelago fleet in 1780, was promoted to lieutenant in 1789 and to captain in 1793.

Trolle married Marie Anne Andrée Aimée Désirée de Flavigny in 1797 and the couple had one daughter.

=== Governor of Saint Barthélemy ===
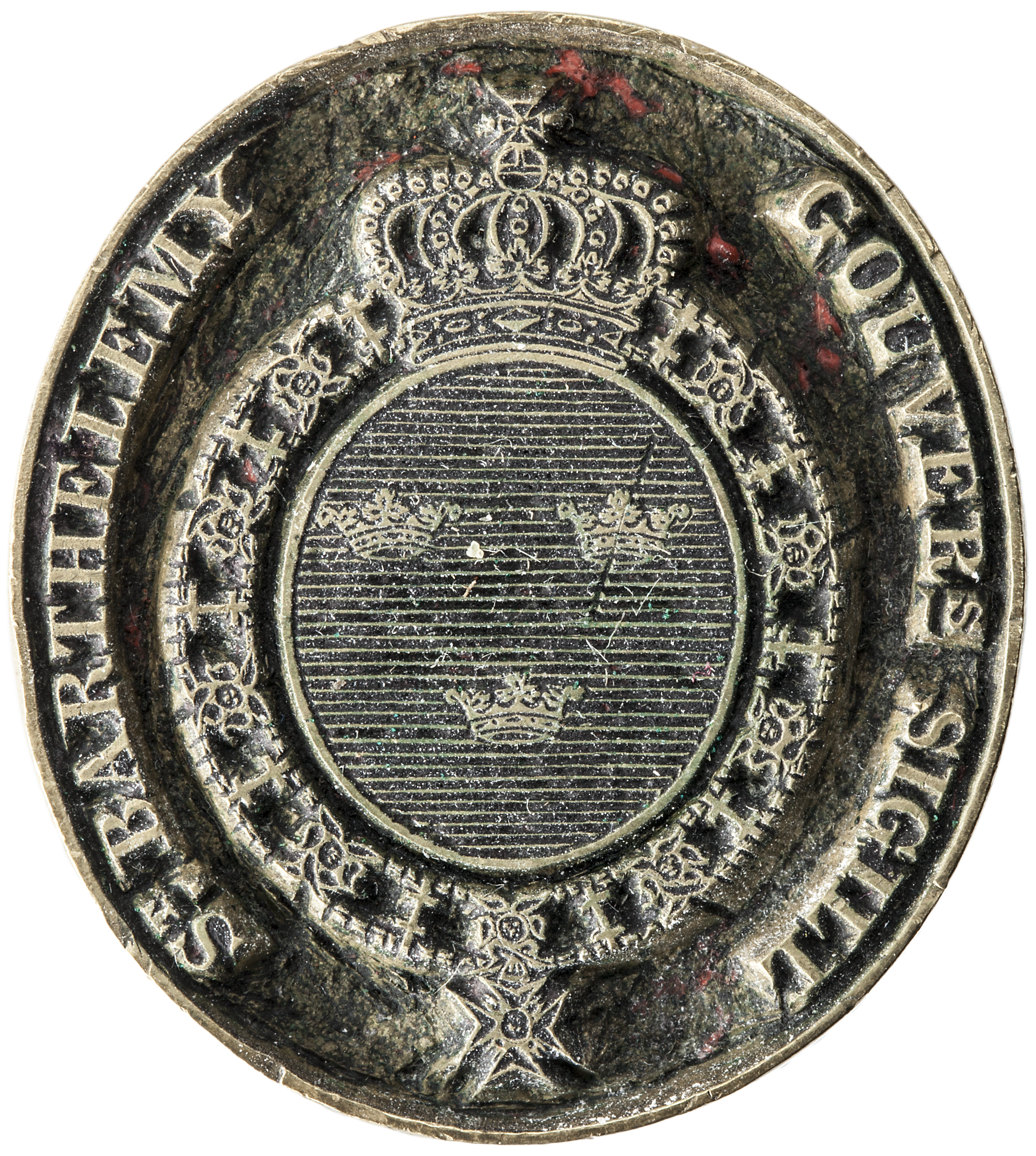
Seal of the Swedish governor of Saint Barthélemy, 1784–1878.

Trolle was appointed governor following the dismissal of governor Bagge, whom the British considered to be too pro-French. Meanwhile, relations with the French Revolutionary government had deteriorated to the point that the governor of Guadeloupe, Victor Hugues, considered the island a hideout for rebels and émigrés, and closed all French Republican ports in the Caribbean to Swedish ships. Tensions worsened in May 1798 when Hugues declared to Trolle that a state of semi-war now existed between France and all neutral countries in the Caribbean. The situation only eased after Hugues was forcibly returned to France in December of the same year.

In 1796, Trolle became involved in the case of the Swedish-flagged brigantine La Neutralité, which was seized by port authorities in New York while undergoing repairs. The seizure was made under the Slave Trade Act of 1794, which prohibited the outfitting of vessels for the slave trade in U.S. ports. The ship belonged to the Saint Barthélemy-based company Vaucrosson & Son, which had organized slave expeditions. The ship was eventually released and returned to its owners after the captain, Daniel Campbell, signed a $10,000 bond and formally declared that the vessel would not be used for participation in the slave trade. Both the Vaucrossons and governor Trolle tried to revoke the bond, and Trolle even brought the issue to president John Adams, citing the 1783 Treaty of Amity and Commerce. The case eventually came under review by the U.S. attorney general, who upheld the bond.

This was not the only time that Trolle had to deal with the Vaucrossons. Another affair, known as the "Vaucrosson coin lawsuit", began in 1798 following suspicions that the Vaucrossons were circulating false gold coins. Trolle had ordered them to deposit 40,000 piastres groundes in hard cash or to provide security for the same amount, which the Vaucrossons were unable to produce, and thus father and son ended up incarcerated at Fort Gustav. Meanwhile, the Conseil de Justice in Gustavia passed a judgment ordering that all of the Vaucrossons’ properties be seized and referred the case to the Swedish king. This judgment was later temporarily reversed by the Supreme Court of Sweden, followed by a series of written pleas exchanged between Gustavia and Stockholm, until the supreme court finally acquitted the Vaucrossons in 1801.

Trolle resigned as governor in 1801 but remained on the island. At the time of the British occupation of the island, Trolle was a member of the war council in the colony and had voted to surrender to the British fleet. He became a prisoner of war and was sent to Antigua along with other Swedish officials, but was allowed to return to Saint Barthélemy in June of the same year.

Trolle returned to Sweden around 1810 and was awarded the Order of the Sword. He took part in the campaign against Norway in 1814 and was later promoted to lieutenant colonel.

In 1816, a lengthy legal proceeding was initiated against him due to his actions during the Vaucrosson coin case. In 1821, he was sentenced by the Svea Court of Appeal to a fine of 333 riksdaler and 16 skilling banco. The fine was appealed to the supreme court, which relieved him from having to pay it.

Trolle died in 1824, living in poverty during his last years.

Political offices
| Preceded by Carl Fredrik Bagge af Söderby | Governor of Saint Barthélemy; 1795–1801 | Succeeded by Hans Henrik Anckarheim |
