= Battle of Palva Sund =

1808 battle of the Finnish War

- Part of the Finnish War
| Date | 18 September 1808 |
| Location | Finnish archipelago, near Velkua |
| Result | Russian victory |

Belligerents
| Sweden | Russian Empire |

Commanders and leaders
| Salomon von Rajalin | Aleksey Yefimovich Myasoyedov |

Strength
| 31 gun sloops | 70–80 gun sloops |

Casualties and losses
| 30 killed 54 wounded 1 gun sloop sunk | 200 killed, wounded or captured 3 gun sloops sunk |

The Battle of Palva Sund was fought between Sweden and Russia during the Finnish War 1808–09.

== Background ==
Part of the Swedish forces of the newly formed Swedish southern army of Finland landed with roughly 3 000 men consisting of 6 infantry battalions, 2 squadrons of cavalry and 2 artillery batteries under command of Major general Albrekt von Lantinghausen to Lokalax (Finnish: Lokalahti) on 17 September 1808. It was tasked with cutting road connections between Nystad and Åbo and then link up further to the north with earlier landed forces of Ernst von Vegesack. Troops were badly equipped some of the men lacking overcoats and had very limited amount of ammunition. Originally landing was to be done to a small village of Helsinki but news of the Russian coastal units near Palva made the commander to choose landing site further north. While initial landing was successful Russian cossack patrol had seen the landing and notified the Russian forces in the vicinity. Russian infantry, artillery and cavalry were sent to beat back the landing force all the way from Åbo. Already on 18 September Russians counterattacked the numerically superior Swedes who were soon forced to withdraw due to ammunition shortages. Withdrawal was successful and was completed in good order already before evening. Swedes lost 125 as dead or wounded and 15 and prisoners of war while Russian losses were around 200 dead and wounded. Von Lantinghausen requested to be relieved from duty due to illness and the annoyed King Gustav IV Adolf swiftly granted this assigning Lieutenant-Colonel Gustaf Olof Lagerbring as the new commander and tasked him with repeating the landing operation as soon as possible.

== Battle ==
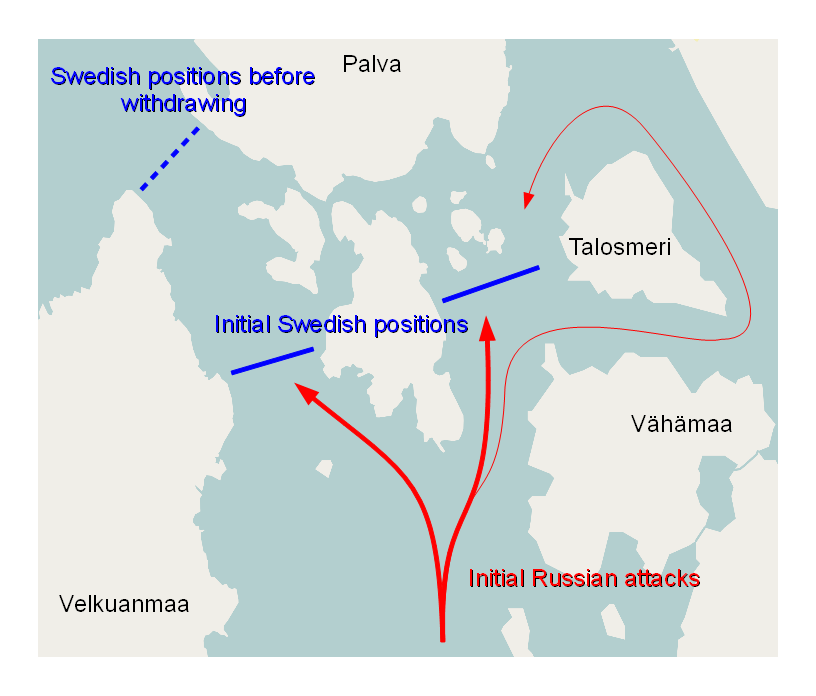
Battle of Palva sund on both sides of Lailluoto island

As the Swedish forces were performing landing operations further to the north gun sloops and yawls from the Swedish archipelago fleet were used to provide cover for the landing force. Commander of the force, Admiral Salomon von Rajalin chose the natural choke point at the Palva strait (Swedish: Palva sund) as the place for stopping the numerically superior Russians. He split the force under his command into two and placed them to both sides of the Lailuoto island. Approaching Russian coastal fleet led by Admiral Myasoedov consisted of over 70 gun sloops or yawls together with several larger ships. Myasoedov had planned attacking against both of the Swedish flanks simultaneously with force of 20 gun sloops or yawls each and then have a small unit of 6 gun yawls to outflank the Swedes by rounding the island of Talosmeri while rest of the force would be kept in reserve. Myasoedov had planned his attack to start already on 17 September but strong winds and heavy waves prompted him to delay the attack with a day.

Fight started already at 0400 on the morning of 18 September with most of the battlefield still covered in fog and darkness. One hour later Swedes had already defeated the initial thrust and moved forward on their eastern flank to advance between Lailuoto and Vähämaa islands in order to prevent the Russians from getting into their rear. However unit of Russian gun yawls had already managed to get through the narrows and attacked the Swedish eastern flank from the rear causing much disorder and damage to it which forced the Swedish force east of the Lailuoto island to withdraw. By 0900 Russians started attacking by using their reserves and forced also the Swedish western flank between Lailuoto and Velkuanmaa to withdraw as well. Russian reserves managed to push Swedish ships to the narrows between Palva and Valkuanmaa but failed to rout them. Swedes tried later to reform in the open outside of Palva strait but Russian flanking maneuvers forced von Rajalin to start withdrawing further to the north.

== Kahiluoto ==
After repairing the damages suffered against the Swedes Russians tried to advance further towards the Swedish landing sites but found all the narrows leading north to be manned by Swedes. On 1 October amidst heavy snowfall, Russians tried to clear the Swedes from narrows near the island of Kahiluoto, but despite an artillery duel which continued until dusk, failed to drive the Swedes from the narrows. Since Swedish landing forces had already been driven back Myasoedov saw little point in continuing the fight and retired back to Åbo for the winter. Swedish forces which had managed to hold the narrows were ordered to leave on 3 October, since the Russians were constructing artillery batteries further to the north, blocking the sole escape route from the narrows of Kahiluoto.

== Bibliography ==
- Mattila, Tapani (1983). Meri maamme turvana [Sea safeguarding our country] (in Finnish). Jyväskylä: K. J. Gummerus Osakeyhtiö. ISBN 951-99487-0-8.
