= Colombier, Saint Barthélemy =

Colombier
- Quartier
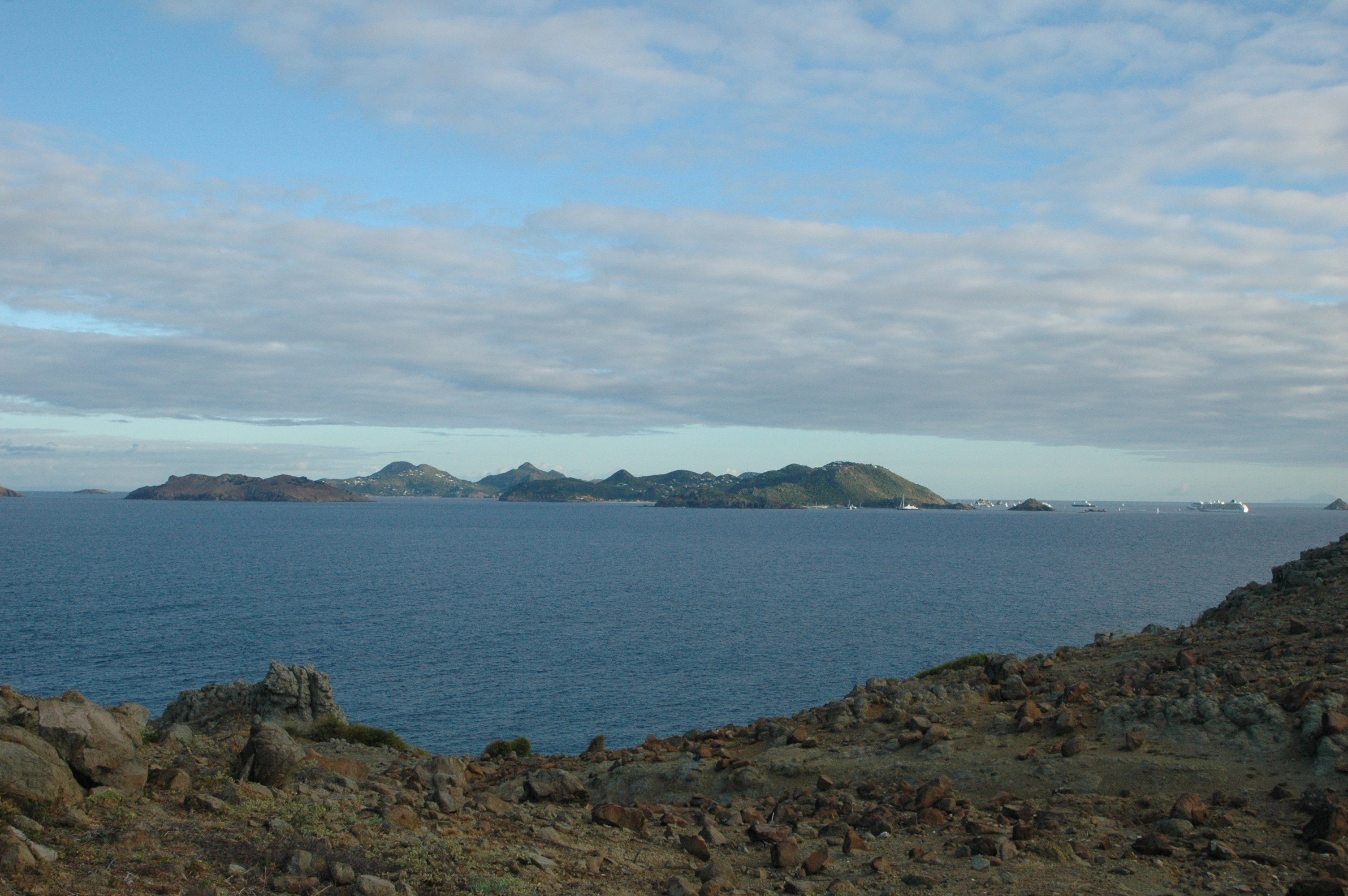

- The quartier of Colombier, Saint Barthélemy marked 1.
- Coordinates: 17°55′14″N 62°52′13″W
- Country: France
- Overseas collectivity: Saint Barthélemy

Colombier (French pronunciation: [kɔlɔ̃bje]) is a quartier of Saint Barthélemy in the Caribbean. It is located in the northwestern part of the island.

== Geography ==
=== Beach ===
Colombier has a white sand beach lined with vegetation, which is the last beach on the island not served by a public road. It is a secluded beach - an entire bay area only accessible by boat or foot. The only building which can be seen from the beach is the home of billionaire David Rockefeller, the origin of the development of a high-end tourism in Saint-Bartholomew. There are no restaurants or hotels around this beach. L'Anse de Colombier is now part of the natural marine reserve of Saint Barthemlemy.

As most of the more popular beaches on the island, the tourist season can affect the ambiance and cause increased foot traffic on this beach. Some days, especially Sundays, the anchorage is full of boats and small yachts, making this one of the more crowded beaches. During other seasons, when there are fewer travellers, the beach can be almost deserted.

==== Beach Trails ====
There is a small trail from Petite Anse to the beach that takes about 20 minutes. Along this route, the Couresse of the Band of Anguilla (Alsophis rijgersmaei), a small protected snake, and many ameives may be seen. A cave which houses a small colony of bats (Molossus molossus) lies in the recesses of the cliff. There are also lilies, purple orchids, and cacti along path.

The trail beginning at the top of Colombier is not recommended for elderly and small children and the walk back can be strenuous and demanding.

The trail starting directly off of the end of Flamands is easier but physical in any case, hiking around noon hours is not advised unless you have the necessary sun protection.

==== Rockefeller Home ====
A large plot of land was purchased by the Rockefellers in the 1960s. They built an awe-inspiring villa which has, since then, been sold. The villa remains standing, preventing any new building from being erected.

=== Nature Reserve ===
The Nature Reserve protects underwater ecosystems, such as seagrass beds and coral reefs, which are home much biodiversity. The Reserve maintains several ecological moorings near the coast in Colombier Bay.

Scientific monitoring is conducted in these moorings in order to better understand the evolution of these habitats. This monitoring allows scientists to monitor the health of these habitats and highlight the effect of protective measures. The coral reefs of Colombier are studied - the most recent results show an increase in coral presence by 9% between 2007 and 2008 with no significant bleaching.

=== Marine flora ===
Recent studies conducted by the Nature Reserve have identified over 50 different algae and 5 species of seagrasses.

These seagrasses are flowering plants, not algae, and are mainly found in sheltered bays, such as Colombier. Two species of seagrasses can be found in the bay:

Tortle Grass (Thalassia testudinum). Recognizable by its large, flattened, ribbon-like leaves, this seagrass houses many small organizations on its leaves. These small organizations serve as a food source for many animals. These "meadows" are the habitat of Lambis, sea urchins, sea stars, and green turtles. Green Turtle feed this grass, which is why it is called tortl grass.

Manatee Grass (Syringodium filiforme). This grass is common in Saint-Barthélemy, where it grows up to 30m deep. Manatee Grass features thin, cylindrical leaves.

=== Mammals ===
8 of 15 species bats found in the French Antilles exist in Saint Barthelemy. At dusk, the Lesser Antillean ardrops (Ardrops nichollsi) or Natalus stramineus may be seen. Some of these bats form colonies and regroup in the caves of the cliffs in Colombier.
