= Järpås =

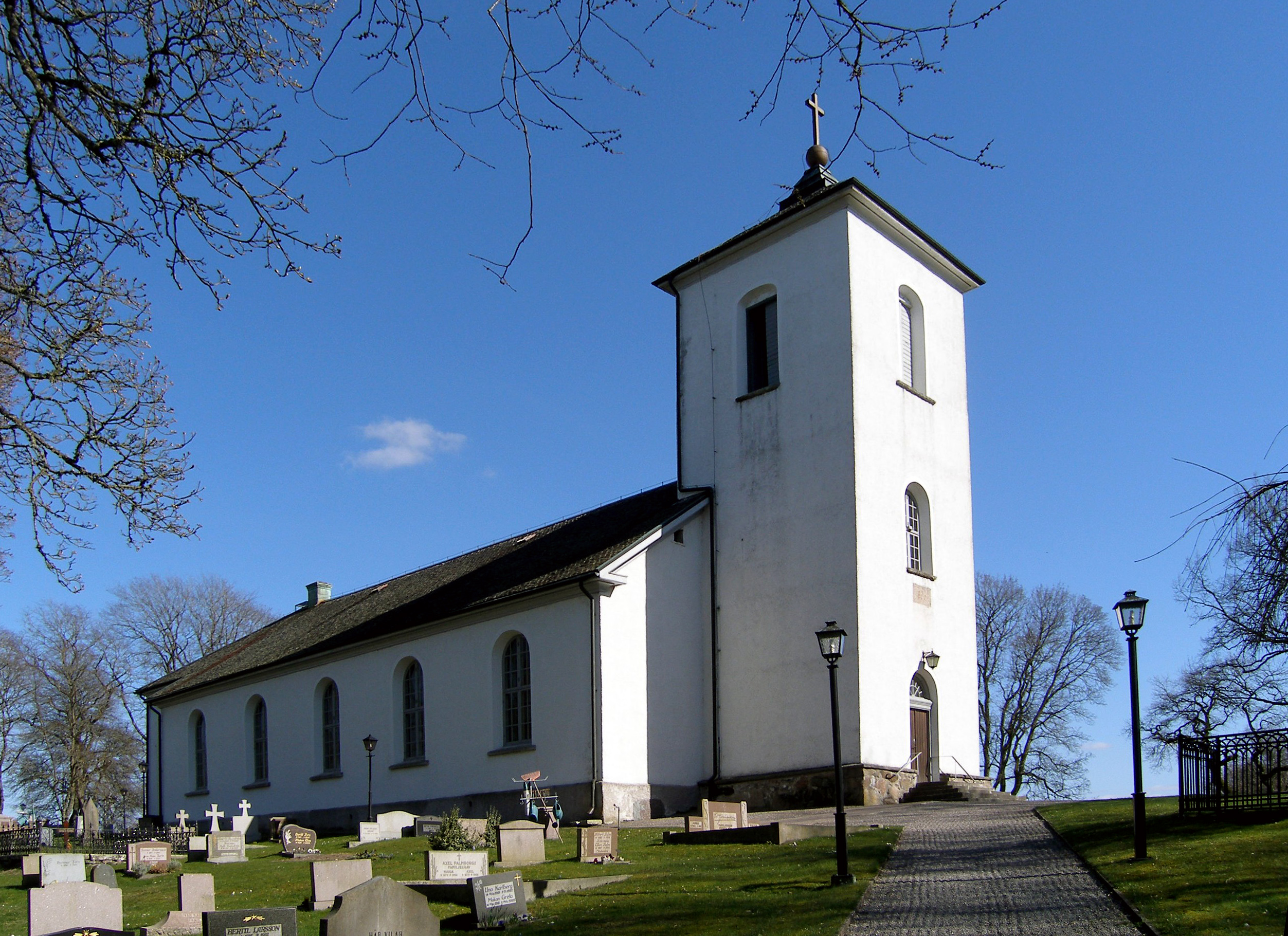
- Järpås church

- Location within Västra Götaland Location within Sweden
- Coordinates: 58°23′N 12°58′E
- Country: Sweden
- Province: Västergötland
- County: Västra Götaland County
- Municipality: Lidköping Municipality

Area
  - Total: 1.0 km^{2} (0.39 sq mi)

Population (31 December 2010)
  - Total: 795
  - Density: 794/km^{2} (2,060/sq mi)
- Time zone: UTC+1 (CET)
  - Summer (DST): UTC+2 (CEST)
- Climate: Cfb

Järpås is a locality situated in Lidköping Municipality, Västra Götaland County, Sweden. It had 795 inhabitants in 2010.
