= Hans Henrik Anckarheim =

Swedish military officer and colonial administrator (1748–1814)

Governor of Saint Barthélemy
- In office 26 January 1801 – 14 February 1812
- Monarchs: Gustav IV Adolf; Charles XIII
- Preceded by: Georg Henrik Johan af Trolle
- Succeeded by: Berndt Robert Gustaf Stackelberg

Personal details
- Born: 15 May 1748 Närtuna, Sweden
- Died: 22 May 1814 (aged 66) Stockholm, Sweden

Military service
- Allegiance: Sweden
- Branch/service: Archipelago fleet
- Rank: Admiral
- Battles/wars: Russo-Swedish War (1788–1790); Battle of Svensksund (1789); Battle of Fredrikshamn; Surrender of Saint Barthélemy (1801); Saint-Barthélemy Mutiny
- Awards: Order of the Sword

Hans Henrik Anckarheim (Note: Also spelled Ankarheim in some sources) (May 15, 1748 – May 22, 1814) was a Swedish military officer and colonial administrator who served as governor of Saint Barthélemy from 1801 to 1812, the only Swedish colony in the West Indies at the time.

== Biography ==
Anckarheim was born in Närtuna, Uppland. He joined the archipelago fleet at an early age and was promoted to sergeant-major in 1765, followed by dockyard captain in 1777. In 1783, he rose to the rank of dockyard major. In 1789, he was placed in charge of an ordnance depot at the Sveaborg fortress. During the 1788–1790 war against the Russian Empire, he saw action at the First Battle of Svensksund and the battle of Fredrikshamn.

Anckarheim was ennobled in 1772, shortly after king Gustav III ascended to the throne. Originally born Grise, he took the new family name Anckarheim upon being raised to the nobility.

=== Governor of Saint Barthélemy ===
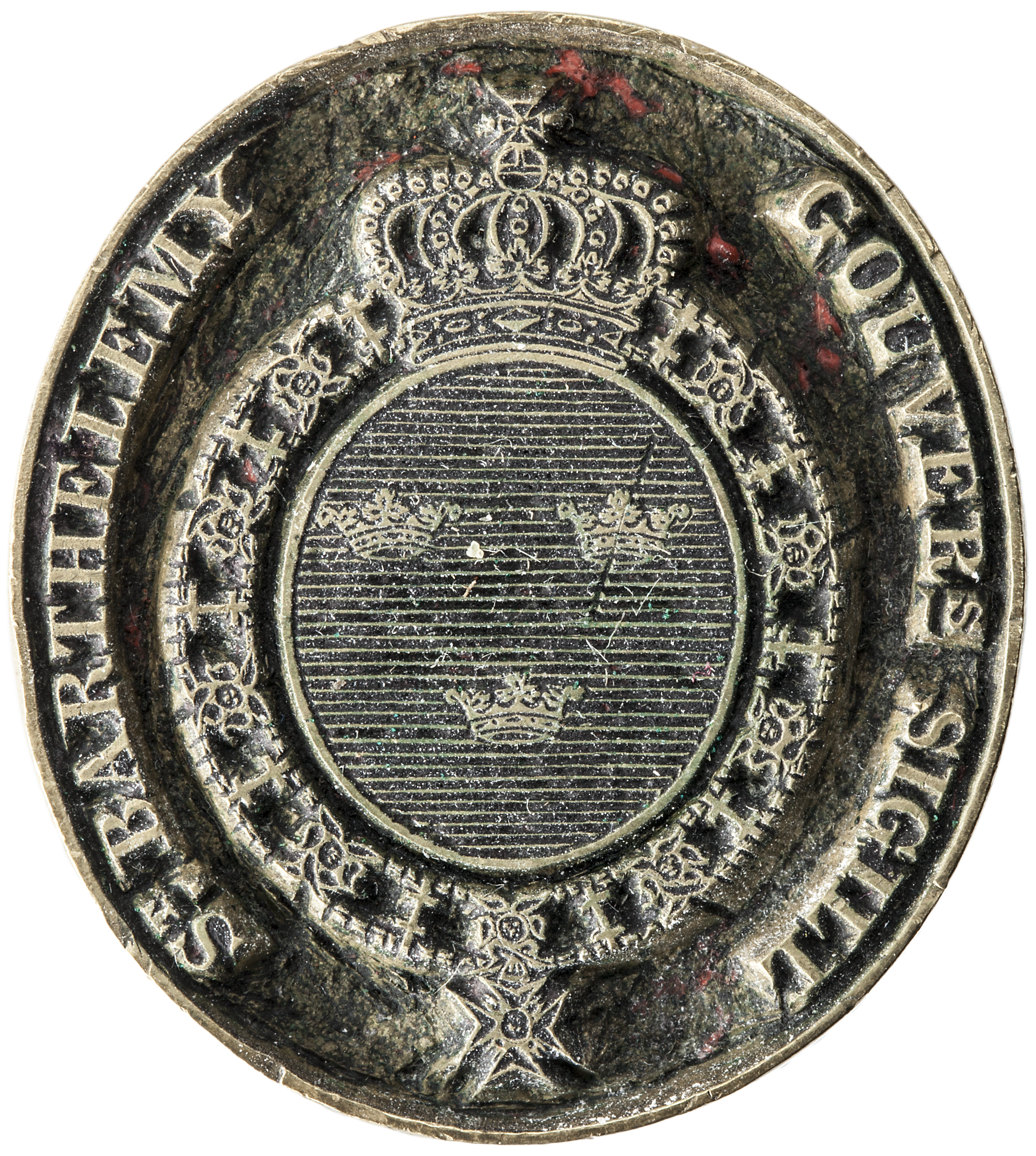
Seal of the Swedish governor of Saint Barthélemy, 1784–1878.

He was appointed governor of Saint Barthélemy on 26 September 1800 and arrived on the island on 18 January the following year, formally taking command on 26 January. During his governorship, the island was invaded twice, first by the British, who occupied the island from 19 March 1801 to 10 July 1802, and later by the French, who attacked on 12 November 1807.

On 19 March 1801, a large British fleet approached the island. Anckarheim tried to mount a defense but could only muster 35 militiamen in addition to the 18 Swedish soldiers stationed on the island. After hastily assembling the War council the following day, it was decided that the island would surrender. During this time, he became a prisoner of war but was allowed to stay on the island, acting as place de major, unlike his predecessor, the former governor af Trolle, who was sent to Antigua along with other Swedish officials.

The French landed on the island on the night of 12 November 1807 with a few ships carrying around 100 men. After a short exchange of fire between the invaders and the garrison at Fort Karl, which killed two Swedish soldiers, the French commander, Major Mitton, declared to Anckarheim that he was not interested in harming the island or its inhabitants. The purpose of French expedition was to put an end to the trade conducted by a Jewish merchant named William Israël. Israël had been conducting a profitable trade with Haiti, something the French wanted to put an end to. At the time of the French arrival, Israël had already left the island and the invaders confiscated all his belongings that were left behind, which included a brig and a schooner. The French held the island for less than 24 hours before departing.

His governorship also saw the only rebellion against Swedish colonial rule on the island, when in 1810 a mutiny among the white population in Gustavia occurred. Tensions had long been growing between the militia and the colonial authorities, culminating in a mutiny when the militia was ordered to disarm. The authorities temporarily lost control of the island and Anckarheim was captured in his home. The situation calmed down after judge Anders Bergstedt was forced to leave the island on a ship bound for Sint Eustatius. The exact motives behind the mutiny have never been fully clarified. After the mutiny, tensions between the merchants and the Swedish administration eased, as the merchants were given access to the council and granted limited political power. The fact that the governor had recognized the mutineers’ cause as just, along with the royal pardon granted by the newly elected crown prince Charles XIV John, also contributed to restoring order and to the continued legitimization of the Swedish colonial authorities.

In 1812, Anckarheim resigned from his post as governor and returned to Sweden. Upon his return, he was promoted to admiral. He succumbed to edema in 1814. He was buried at Holmkyrkan, a small wooden church that burned down in 1822 and was located on the site that now hosts the Nationalmuseum. Anckarheim married Sara Elizabeth (née Gillberg), and the couple had one daughter. His family did not accompany him to Saint Barthélemy. Anckarheim was a recpeient of the Order of the Sword.

== Notes ==
Political offices
Preceded by Georg Henrik Johan af Trolle	Governor of Saint Barthélemy; 1801–1812	Succeeded by Berndt Robert Gustaf Stackelberg
