= Salomon von Rajalin =

Swedish baron, admiral and county governor (1757–1825)

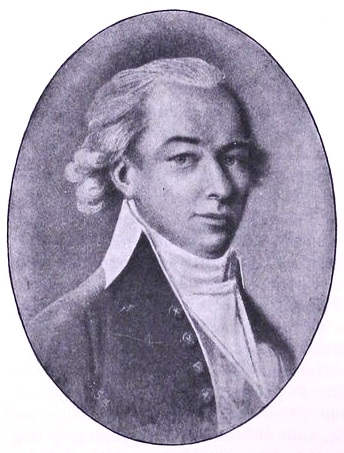
- Born: Salomon Maurits von Rajalin; 25 August 1757; Karlskrona, Sweden
- Died: 23 September 1825 (aged 68); Stockholm, Sweden
- Burial place: Klara Cemetery
- Military career
- Branch: Swedish Navy
- Service years: 1773–1809
- Rank: Admiral
- Conflicts: Russo-Swedish War (1788–1790); Finnish War; Battle of Palva Sund
- Other work: Governor of Saint Barthélemy; Governor of Gotland County; Governor of Gävleborg County

Salomon Maurits von Rajalin (25 August 1757 – 23 September 1825) was a Swedish friherre (baron), admiral and civil servant belonging to the von Rajalin family.

== Early life ==
Rajalin was born on 25 August 1757 in Karlskrona, Sweden, the son of Vice Admiral Johan von Rajalin and his wife Barbara Eleonora von Gertten. Johan von Rajalin served as governor of Blekinge County from 1769 to 1783 and was created friherre in 1771. Salomon's grandfather was the Finnish-born naval officer Thomas von Rajalin who served in the Great Northern War and later became commander of the Swedish Navy during the War of the Hats before dying aboard his flagship.

== Career ==
Appointed at the age of sixteen to acting sub-lieutenant in the Fleet of the Army, Rajalin served 1780–82 as an employee of the French Navy. After having returned to Sweden, he quickly rose through the ranks and became, since the Caribbean island of Saint Barthélemy in 1784 came into Swedish possession, in 1785 the first Swedish governor there. From there he was transferred in 1787 to the governor location on Gotland and held that post for 20 years, during which he however long periods of time held different positions of trust. He was during the Russo-Swedish War 1788–90 military commander of the Archipelago fleet and excelled particularly in an engagement at Porkkalanniemi on 26 August 1789.

After the peace treaty he became rear admiral in 1791 and was 1791–94 general commissary in the fleet. Appointed vice admiral in 1799, Rajalin was 1801–09 as acting adjutant general, rapporteur before the king in cases involving the fleet. During the Finnish War in 1808 he commanded the Archipelago fleet, but resigned from this position in October of that year. Appointed in 1809 by Charles XIII to admiral, he became in 1812 governor of Gävleborg County, but resigned already in 1813 from this position.

== Personal life and death ==
On 10 November 1787 in Karlskrona, he married Fredrica Lovisa Jägersköld, the daughter of vice admiral Christer Ludvig Jägersköld and his wife Anna Fredrica Grubbe. von Rajalin died childless on 23 September 1825 in Stockholm. The funeral was held at Ulrika Eleonora Church and he was buried at Klara Cemetery. When his brother died in 1826, the baronial family von Rajalin was emanated.

== Dates of rank ==
von Rajalins' ranks:

=== Sweden ===
- 14 September 1771 – Sergeant
- 15 July 1773 – Second lieutenant
- 19 February 1777 – Lieutenant
- 4 June 1783 – Captain
- 22 September 1784 – Major
- 14 July 1787 – Lieutenant colonel
- 31 August 1787 – Major general
- 23 August 1790 – Rear admiral
- 5 August 1799 – Vice admiral
- 27 September 1808 – Admiral

=== France ===
- 1779 – Lieutenant des vaisseaux

== Awards and decorations ==
- (Sweden) Commander Grand Cross of the Order of the Sword (1801)
- (Sweden) Commander of the Order of the Sword (1797)
- (Sweden) Knight Grand Cross of the Order of the Sword (1789)
- (Sweden) Knight of the Order of the Sword (1779)
- (Kingdom of France) Knight of the Institution of Military Merit

== Honours ==
- Honorary member of the Royal Swedish Academy of War Sciences (1805; president 1805–1806)
- Honorary member of the Royal Swedish Society of Naval Sciences (1805)

Political offices
Preceded by First	Governor of Saint Barthélemy; 1785–1787	Succeeded by Pehr Herman Rosén von Rosenstein
Preceded by Carl Otto von Segebaden	Governor of Gotland County; 1787–1807	Succeeded by Carl Fredrik Aschling
Preceded by Fredrik Adolf Ulrik Cronstedt	Governor of Gävleborg; 1812–1813	Succeeded by Eric Samuel Sparre
Professional and academic associations
Preceded by ?	President of the Royal Swedish Academy of War Sciences; 1805–1806	Succeeded by ?
