= Swedish colony of Saint Barthélemy =

Swedish island colony in the Caribbean from 1784 to 1878

Colony of Saint Barthélemy Barthélemy
- 1784–1878
- Flag Seal of governor (1784–1877)

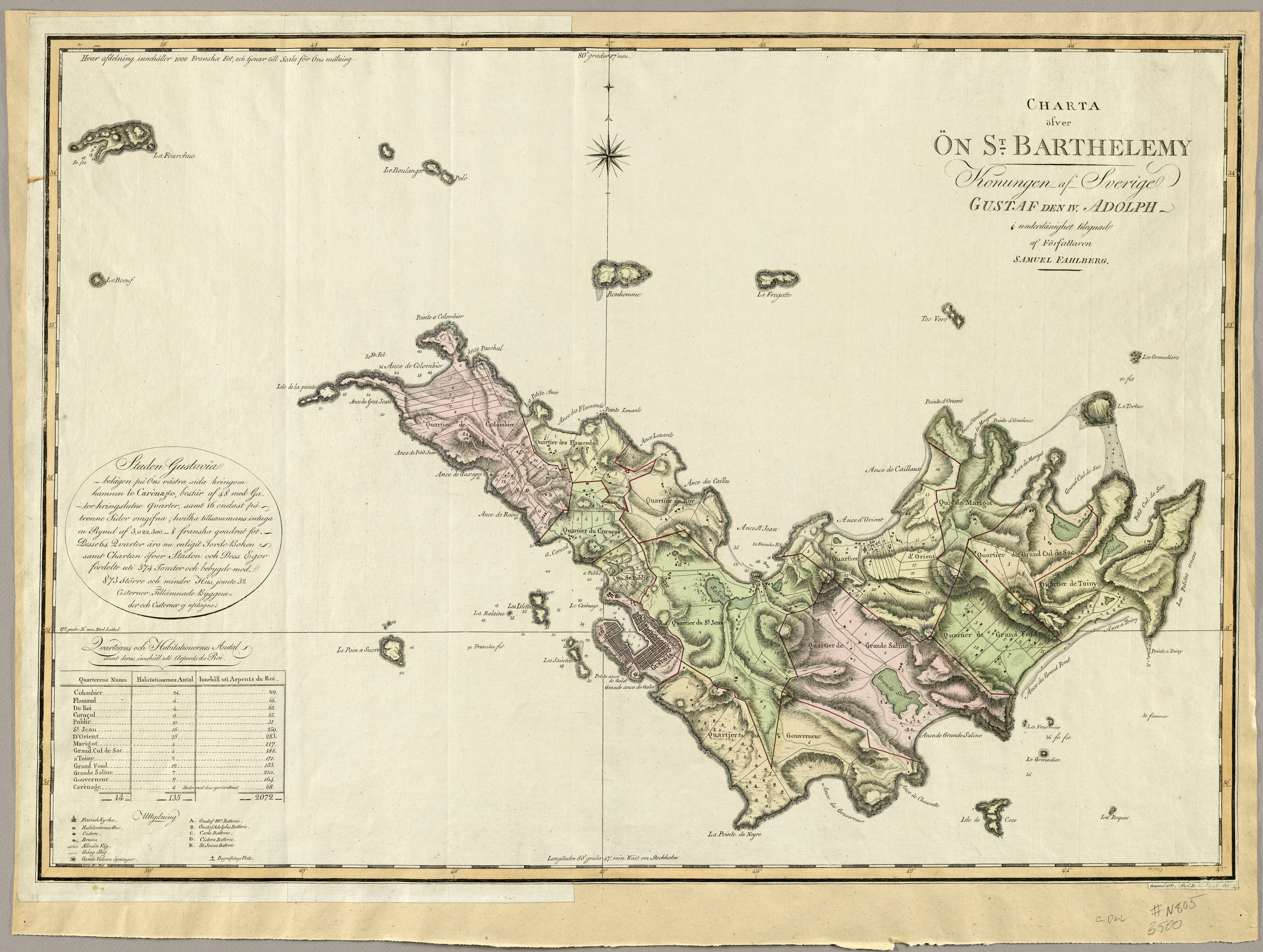
- Swedish map of Saint Bartélemy, 1801.
- Status: Colony of Sweden
- Capital: Gustavia
- Common languages: Swedish, French, English
- King
  - 1784–1792: Gustav III (first)
  - 1872–1878: Oscar II (last)
- Governor
  - 1785–1787: Salomon von Rajalin (first)
  - 1868–1878: Bror Ludvig Ulrich (last)
- Historical era: Swedish colonization of the Americas
  - Exchanged with Sweden: 1 July 1784
  - Sold back to France: 16 March 1878

Area
- 1878: 21.24 km^{2} (8.20 sq mi)

Population
  - 1800: 5,000
  - 1863: 2,834
  - 1875: 2,374
- ISO 3166 code: BL
Preceded by	Succeeded by
Kingdom of France	Guadeloupe

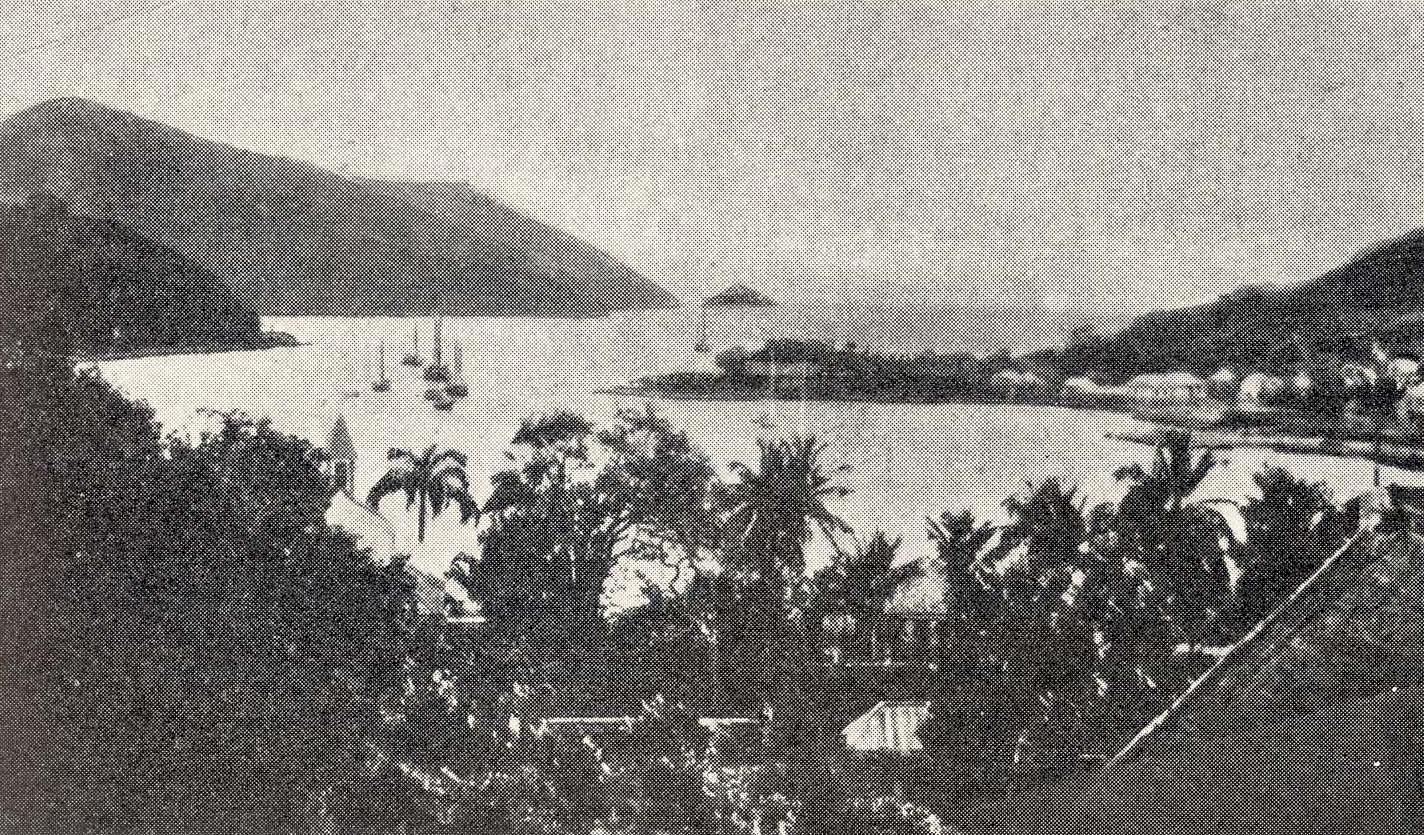
Photo about 1865

The Swedish colony of Saint Barthélemy existed for nearly a century. In 1784, one of French king Louis XVI's ministers ceded Saint Barthélemy to Sweden in exchange for trading rights in the Swedish port of Gothenburg. Swedish rule lasted until 1878 when the French repurchased the island.

== Background ==
Following problems experienced by early French settlers, Saint Barthélemy was successfully colonized by French mariners in 1763. Attracted by the island's prosperity during the American Revolutionary War, Gustav III of Sweden agreed to exchange French trading rights in Gothenburg against Swedish colonization of the island. In addition to its fresh water sources, the island produced moderate amounts of cotton, sugar, cocoa, tobacco and fruits while it promised substantial revenue from trade through its natural harbour on the island's west coast.

On 1 July 1784, the island became a Swedish possession. The king informed Sweden's privy council of the acquisition on 23 August. On 1 September, Swedish officials under the leadership of Salomon von Rajalin (1757–1825), the island's first Swedish governor, were appointed to administer the island. They sailed from Gothenburg on 4 December 1784 on the frigate Sprengtporten, arriving in Saint Barthélemy on 6 March 1785. In January 1785, the Swedish merchants Jacob Röhl and Adolf Fredrik Hansen had already arrived to establish a trading post with warehousing. At the time, the island had a population of some 750 of whom 281 were enslaved Africans. French was spoken in the rural areas while English was spoken in the capital. Only 3-4% of the population were of Swedish ancestry.

== History of Swedish rule ==
On 7 March 1785, the French commandant Chevalier de Durant ceded authority to von Rajalin who, on 16 April 1785, introduced tax free trading for visiting ships. On 7 September, he established Saint Barthélemy as a free port. The French port of Le Carénage was renamed Gustavia after the Swedish king.

From 28 August 1786, slave trade was included in a royal letter and on 12 March 1790 the taxation regime for the shipment of enslaved West Africans was established. Between a third to half of Saint Barthélemy's population were registered as slaves in 1819 (estimations are between 1,283 and 2,033 slaves). On 31 October 1786, the Swedish West India Company was established on the island with responsibility for maintaining the port and the employment of Swedish officials. By the end of the century, around 1,330 ships visited the port of Gustavia annually.

By the beginning of the 19th century, the population had grown to around 6,000, with some 5,000 living in Gustavia. From 19 March 1801 to 10 July 1802, the British occupied the island after the Swedes surrendered to a British fleet of 16 ships. The weekly journal The Report of St Bartholomew was published from 1804 to 1819 documenting life on the island over a period of 15 years. Following rioting between the island's French and English communities in September 1811, an administrative council consisting of the governor and six officials was established on 25 September to govern the island. Arrangements were also made for popular representation within an assembly which met every three years. Trade continued to flourish during the War of 1812 between Britain and the United States when 20% of American exports were routed via St Barthélemy.

In 1812, the Swedish parliament transferred the colony to the king as his private property. A colonial department was established in the king's chancellery and customs duties and revenues were paid into the king's Saint Barthélemy fund. Revenues from 1812 to 1816 amounted to around SEK 1.9 million and from 1817 to 1830 to SEK 1.8 million providing a total surplus of SEK 2.2 million. In 1839, Gustavia lost its role as a free port. Thereafter Sweden (then unified with Norway) provided the necessary financial support.

In 1840, around 300 died when a feverish epidemic hit the island, reducing the population to about 2,500. In 1850, the island also suffered a severe drought.

In the mid-1840s, the Swedish parliament ruled that Saint Barthélemy should again be included under national administration. The parliament also abolished slave trading and slavery on the island. A census in late 1875 indicated there were around 2,300 living on the island, 800 of whom resided in Gustavia. That year only 399 ships sailed to the island of which 227 were from Britain and 132 from Sweden.

As a result of increases in the financial support required to administer the colony, the Swedish authorities attempted between 1868 and 1870 to negotiate a sale of the island to the United States. Negotiations were also opened with Italy, but they were ended after Sweden learned that Italy was planning on using the island as a penal colony. Later, after Oscar II became king, negotiations were opened with France for the island's repurchase. On 10 August 1877, the transfer agreement was signed in Paris. It was ratified in Stockholm on 9 November 1877 and in Paris on 4 March 1878. The transaction price was 80,000 francs for Swedish assets and 320,000 francs for the repatriation and retirement of Swedish officials. On 16 March 1878, the French officially reoccupied Saint Barthélemy.

== Governors ==
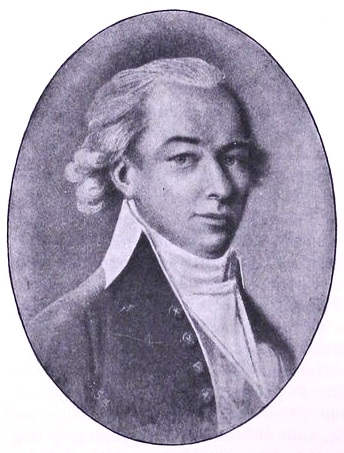
The first Swedish governor, Salomon von Rajalin.

- Salomon von Rajalin (6 March 1785 – 23 April 1787)
- Pehr Herman von Rosenstein (23 April 1787 – 6 June 1790)
- Carl Fredrik Bagge af Söderby (6 June 1790 – 17 November 1795)
- Georg Henrik Johan af Trolle (17 November 1795 – 26 January 1801)
- Hans Henrik Anckarheim (26 January 1801 – 14 February 1812)
- Berndt Robert Gustaf Stackelberg (14 February 1812 – 10 October 1816)
- Johan Samuel Rosensvärd (10 October 1816 – 19 September 1818)
- Carl Fredrik Berghult (acting governor 19 September 1818 – 10 August 1819)
- Johan Norderling (10 August 1819 – 27 April 1826)
- James Haarlef Haasum and Lars G Morsing (May 1826 – October 1833)
- James Haarlef Haasum (October 1833 – August 1858)
- Fredrik Carl Ulrich (August 1858 – August 1868, also acting governor July 1841 – November 1842, July 1844 – November 1845, May 1853 – October 1854)
- Georg Wilhelm Netherwood (acting governor 11 August 1868 – 4 December 1868)
- Bror Ludvig Ulrich (4 December 1868 – 16 March 1878)
- Alarik Helleday (acting governor June 1874 – 5 November 1875)

== See also ==
- 1877 Saint Barthélemy status referendum
- Swedish colonization of the Americas
- Saint-Barthélemy affair
