= Surrender of Saint Barthélemy (1801) =

1801 invasion of the War of the Second Coalition

- Part of the War of the Second Coalition
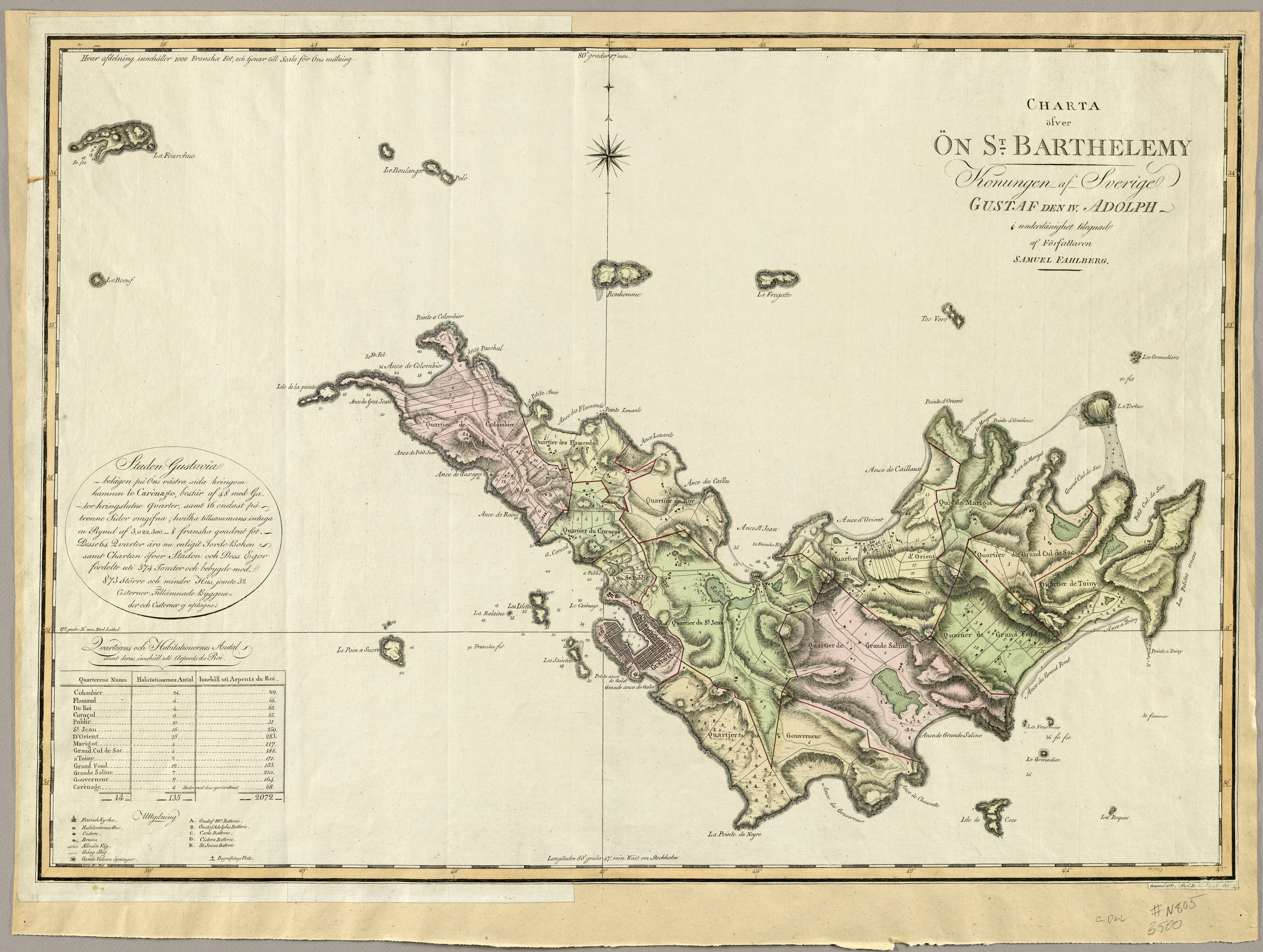
- 1801 map of Saint Barthélemy
Date	19–21 March 1801
Location	Swedish colony of Saint Barthélemy
Result	British victory
Territorial changes	British occupation of Saint Barthélemy

Belligerents
United Kingdom	Sweden

Commanders and leaders
Thomas Trigge; John Duckworth	Hans Henrik Anckarheim (surrendered); Georg Henrik Johan af Trolle (surrendered)

Strength
16 ships	53 men

Casualties and losses
None	Several captured Several ships seized

The surrender of Saint Barthélemy occurred during the War of the Second Coalition. On 19 March, a British fleet arrived off the Swedish colony of Saint Barthélemy and demanded its surrender. Britain had moved to occupy the colony as part of deteriorating Anglo-Swedish relations resulting from Sweden's decision to join the Second League of Armed Neutrality. The colony's governor, Hans Henrik Anckarheim, convened a council of war which unanimously agreed to surrender to the British as Saint Barthélemy's tiny garrison was no match for the invading fleet. Anckarheim surrendered the colony to the British on 21 March, and Saint Barthélemy remained under British occupation until the French Revolutionary Wars ended in 1802.

== Background ==
When Sweden joined the Second League of Armed Neutrality, and news of this reached London in 1801, Britain's Secretary of War Henry Dundas issued secret orders to British commanders in the Leeward Islands to occupy the Danish West Indies and Swedish colony of Saint Barthélemy along with seizing all Danish, Swedish and Russian goods found there.

== Surrender ==
On 19 March, a fleet of 16 British ships under Rear-admiral John Duckworth arrived off the island. The island's governor Hans Henrik Anckarheim proceeded to assemble a force consisting of 18 regular soldiers (all of whom were ill) and 35 militiamen from Gustavia, the countryside and the island's garrison. Two British officers, Captain King and Brigadier-General Fuller, disembarked on the island in order to know if the Swedes would surrender. In response, Anckarheim convened a council of war consisting of several colonial officials and leading citizens of Gustavia (including Carl Dreijer), who agreed unanimously that the island should surrender since it had no chance of resisting the British. Realising that his troops were too few in number and facing widespread discontent and a lack of loyalists on the island, Anckarheim agred to surrender to the British.

== Aftermath ==
On 21 March, the colony formally surrendered to Lieutenant-general Thomas Trigge and Duckworth. Anckarheim became a prisoner of war along with his predecessor, Major Georg Henrik Johan af Trolle, and all the ships in Gustavia harbour were seized by the British. The island's colonists were required to swear allegiance to George III but were granted the right not to fight against Sweden in any future conflicts. Anckarheim was allowed to stay on the island and act as place de major, unlike af Trolle, who was sent to Antigua along with other captured Swedish colonial officials and military officers. However, af Trolle was allowed to return in June 1801.

Following the British occupation of the island, Colonel Wilson became the new governor, with the occupational administration being maintained by a council using Swedish law. Anckarheim requested that Wilson allow Saint Barthélemy's colonists freedom of movement, which was granted. However, on the next day Wilson issued new regulations which restricted freedom of movement to those who became Swedish subjects prior to 1794 in an effort stop contraband trade being carried out by naturalised Swedish merchants. The island was returned to Sweden on 10 July 1802 following the Treaty of Amiens ending the French Revolutionary Wars.

== See also ==
- Saint-Barthélemy affair

== Works cited ==
- Högström, Erik Olof Emanuel (1888). S. Barthelemy under svenskt välde [St. Barthelemy under Swedish rule] (in Swedish). Almqvist & Wiksells.
- Pålsson, Ale (2016). Our Side of the Water: Political Culture in the Swedish colony of St Barthélemy 1800–1825 (PDF). Stockholm Studies in History. Stockholm University. ISBN 9789176493557.
- Wilson, Victor (2019). "Contraband Trade under Swedish Colours: St. Barthélemy's Moment in the Sun, 1793–1815". Journal of Imperial and Global Interactions. Cambridge University Press.
