= Swedish slave trade =

The Swedish slave trade mainly occurred in the early history of Sweden when the trade of thralls (Old Norse: þræll) was one of the pillars of the Norse economy from the 9th to the 11th century, and ended with the widespread adoption of Christianity in Sweden. Slavery was a deeply entrenched institution in Viking society which was hierarchical, and the lowest social class consisted of thralls and slaves, which made up the main source of hard labor in Norse society. Slavery itself was abolished in Sweden in 1335 by King Magnus Eriksson.

During the raids, the Vikings often captured and enslaved militarily weaker peoples they encountered through raids or conquests across Europe. This slave trade lasted from the 8th through the 11th centuries. A smaller trade of African slaves happened during the 17th and 18th centuries as part of the Atlantic slave trade, around the time Swedish overseas colonies were established in North America (New Sweden; 1638–1655) and in Africa (lasting between 1650 and 1663). Similarly to some other European powers, such as the Kingdom of Great Britain following the Somerset v Stewart decision in 1772, slavery was banned in the motherland while being legal in the colonies. Consequently, slavery remained legal on the sole Swedish Caribbean colony of Saint Barthélemy from 1784 until 1847.

The Viking Age was a period of widespread upheaval and disruption throughout the northern world. Viking raiders sought captives, many of whom were captured and held in camps where they were ransomed, exploited and enslaved. The slaves from Western Europe during the Viking era were mainly Franks, Anglo-Saxons, and Celts. Many Irish slaves were used in expeditions for the colonization of Iceland. The Norse also took Baltic, Slavic in Northeastern and Eastern Europe, Latin slaves from Southern Europe, and Moorish slaves from Al-Andalus and North Africa. Vikings navigated the "Highway of the Slaves" through the Aegean Sea and into Black Sea ports first established by Archaic Greeks, shoreline crossroads for human trafficking.

The Persian traveler Ibn Rustah described how Vikings, the Varangians or Rus, terrorized and enslaved the Slavs taken in their raids along the Volga River. These slaves were trafficked to the Middle East via the Bukhara slave trade. Thralldom was outlawed in 1335 by Magnus IV of Sweden for thralls "born by Christian parents" in Västergötland and Värend, being the last parts where it had remained legal. This however, was only applicable within the borders of Sweden, which opened up for later slave trade in the colonies. Similarly to other European countries, slavery was later to be revived in Swedish territories outside of the European motherland.

In the 17th century, starting from 1650, Swedish citizens become involved with the Atlantic slave trade. Sweden set up trading stations along the West African coast with bases on the Swedish Gold Coast, which today belongs to Ghana. In 1663, the Swedish Gold Coast was taken over by Denmark and became part of the Danish Gold Coast. During its dozen years of activity, the Swedish African Company transported around 2,000 slaves. However, the Swedish establishments in West Africa declined after a few years, while the Danish ones continued until 1850. Between 1784 and 1878, Sweden maintained possession of a colony in the Caribbean. The Swedish colony of Saint Barthélemy functioned as a duty-free port and became a major destination center for slave ships. Slaves were brought in tax free by foreign vessels and the Swedish Crown made a profit by collecting an export tax when slaves were shipped out. Sweden was also a major supplier of iron for chains used in the slave trade. Slavery was legislated in Saint-Barthélemy under the Ordinance concerning the Police of Slaves and free Coloured People dated 30 July 1787, original in French dated 30 June 1787. In the autumn of 1786, the Swedish West India Company was established on the island.

In the early 19th century, Sweden signed treaties with the United Kingdom and France to abolish the slave trade. In 1847, slavery itself (since long banned in Sweden proper) was abolished also in the Swedish colony of Saint-Barthélemy, on the basis of a decision taken in 1846. The last legally owned slaves in the Swedish colony of Saint-Barthélemy were bought and freed by the Swedish state on 9 October 1847.

== Migration period ==
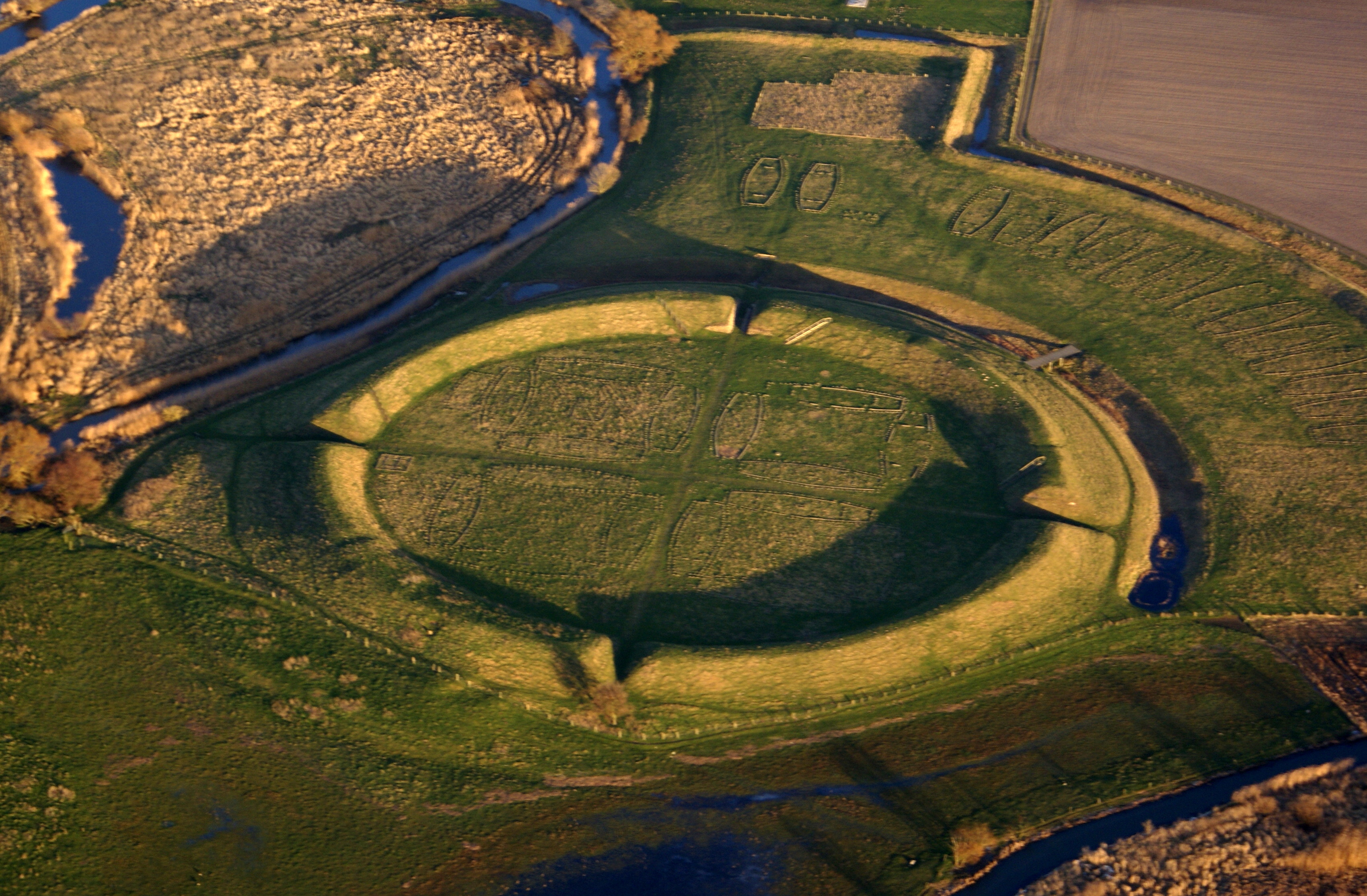
Traditionally, the name trelleborg has been translated and explained as "a fortress built by slaves", since the Old Norse word for slave was thrall (The modern word is træl in Danish and träl in Swedish) and borg means fortress or city.

Early Swedish history is not well documented and the sources are subjected to much scrutiny, especially since the trustworthiness of the Icelandic sagas is in doubt, since the Swedish monarchs mentioned by foreign sources do not correlate with the monarchs mentioned by Icelandic Sagas. During the Semi Legendary period, a slave revolt is mentioned by the Sagas taking place in Sweden. Its authenticity is unknown.

According to the Icelandic sagas, a slave revolt led by the slave Tunne resulted in the Swedish king Ongentheow being deposed and forced to flee to the Danes (Germanic tribe). The Swedish king Ongentheow, sometimes identified with Angan-Tys in the Beowulf, appear to be another version of the name Týs öttungr. Tunne was described as the slave responsible for the guard of the royal treasury and weaponry. Tunne was probably named Eofor as both names mean boar and kennings were frequently used in old Norse and old English. Tunne could have been from the Northlands, as the name Tunne has only been found on Runestones in the Swedish Northlands. The Swedish weaponry was indeed guarded by a slave, as mentioned by the Roman historian Tacitus. According to the saga, Tunne proclaimed himself king of Svitjod, the slaves taking the weapons from the royal weaponry, forced the royals and nobles to retrieve their ancestor's swords and helmets from their graves in Gamla Uppsala to fight the slaves, while Tunne used the weapons from the royal weaponry to defeat the Swedish army in eight battles. The victories of the Tunnes rebels resulted in so many losses for the Swedish king that he was forced to promise the Danish king tribute to ensure his continued support.

The mounds from 500 AD lack weapons, after archaeological examination, supporting the story that weapons were taken from the grave tumulus during the rebellion. With the help of Danish soldiers, the slave uprising was eventually crushed. Tunne, however, killed king Ongenthow before the end of the uprising. In the Icelandic sagas, however, Ongenthow was killed by a boar. In Beowulf, he was killed by the warrior Eofor (who may be identical with Tunne). Eofor slew Ongenthow with his sword with a stab to the head that penetrated Ongenthows helmet. Eofor brought the helmet of Ongenthow to the geats, where he was given protection and rewarded for slaying their rival king. As a reward, Eofor was given the Geatish king Hygelac's daughter in marriage. Eofor in all likelihood killed Ongenthow, however it is not certain that Eofor and Tunni was the same person.

== Swedish slavery and slave trade during the Middle Ages ==
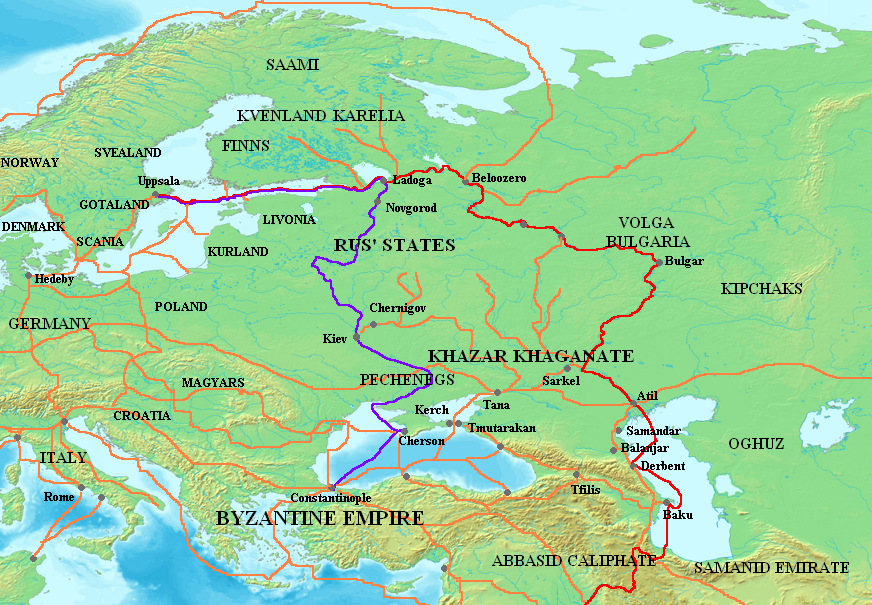
Map showing the major Varangian trade routes: the Volga trade route (in red) and the Trade Route from the Varangians to the Greeks (in purple). Other trade routes of the eighth-eleventh centuries shown in orange.

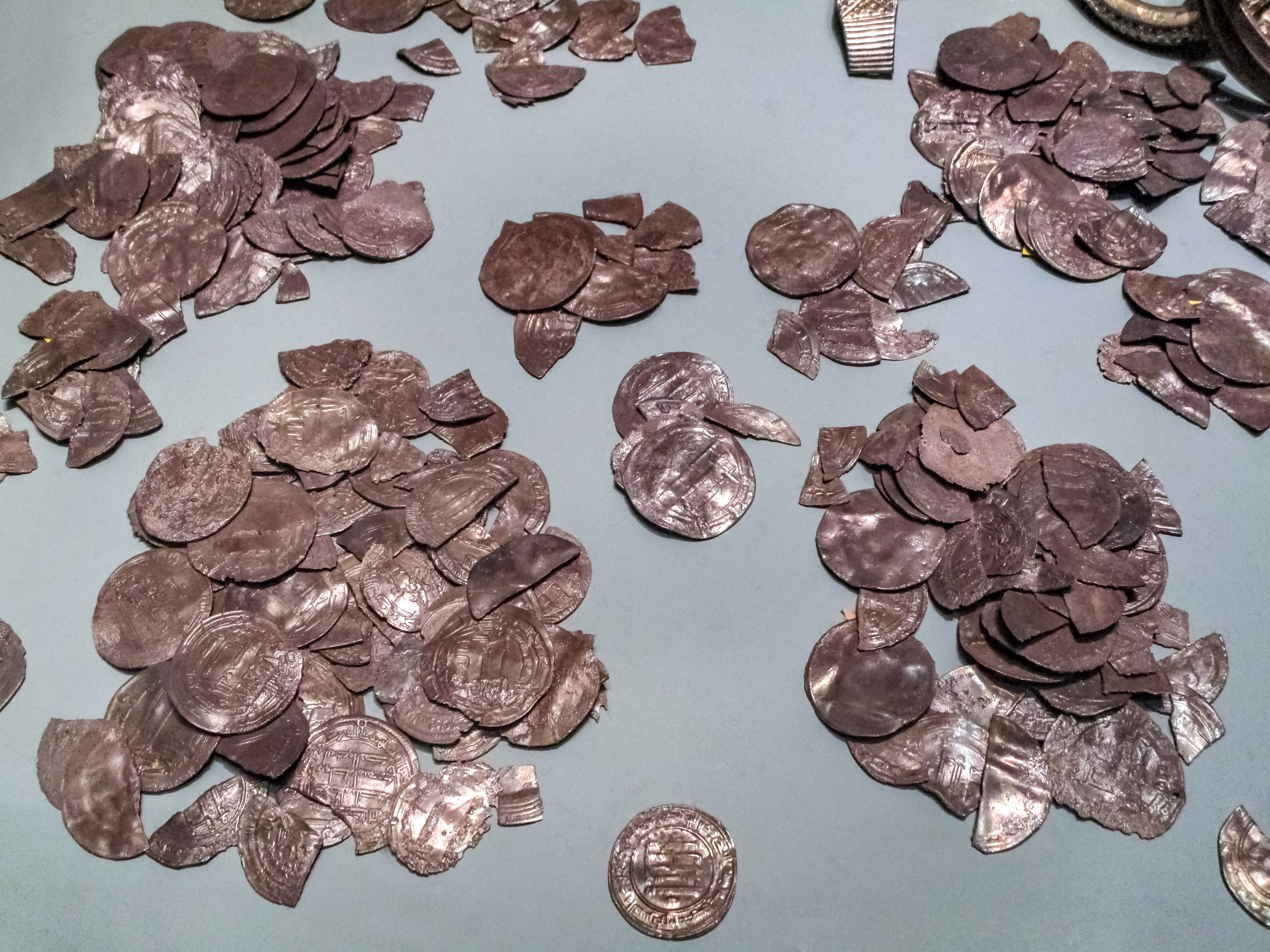
Samanid coins found in the Spillings Hoard

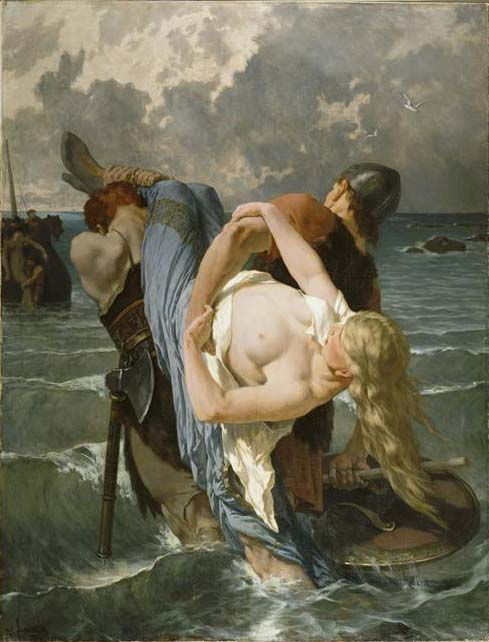
Vikings captured people during their raids in Europe.

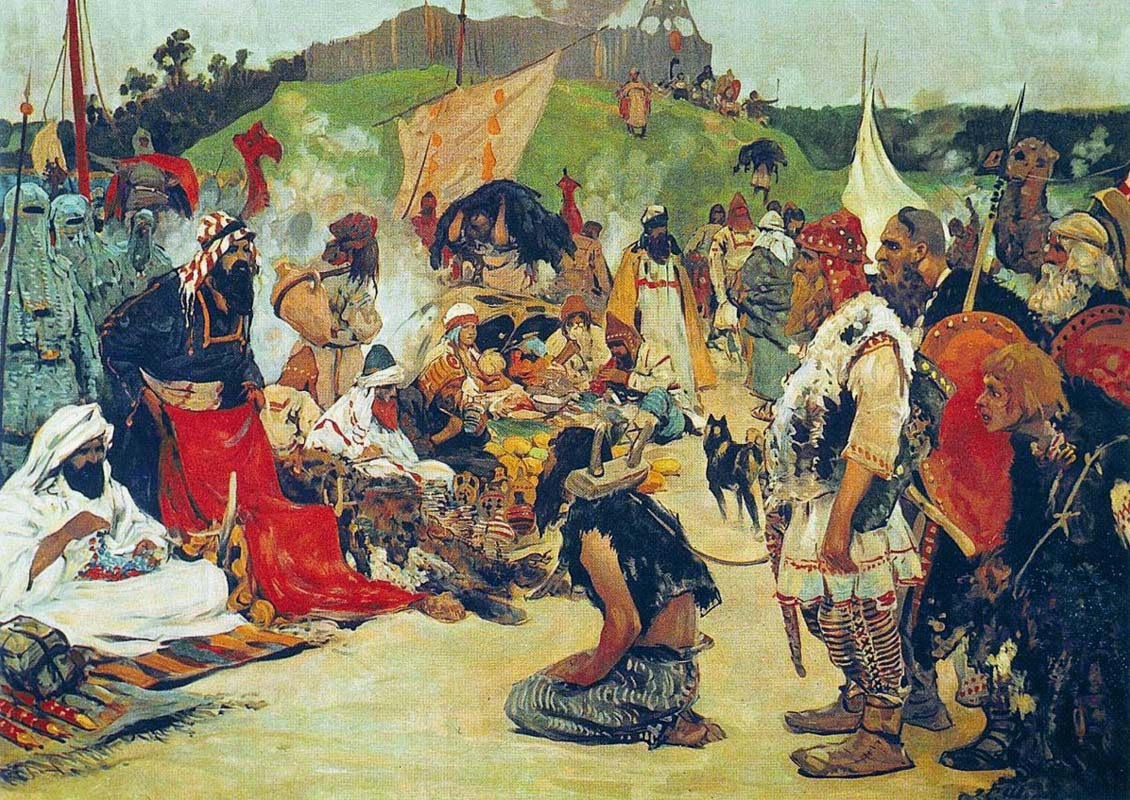
Trade negotiations in the country of Eastern Slavs. Pictures of Russian history. (1909). Vikings sold people they captured in Europe to Muslim merchants in present-day Russia.

Tasks for slaves in Sweden were helping with agricultural output for males and females, with women additionally serving as concubines or domestic servants. Thralls could have some social mobility in Norse society, as for example Olav Tyggvason, who went from captured slave of Estonians to king of Norway.

=== Background ===
Slavery was common in the Viking age period, and one of the main reasons for the Viking expansion was the search for slaves in other countries. One of the reasons Kievan Rus came to be was that Scandinavian settlers established themselves and traded with captured slaves. During the eighth to tenth centuries, slaves from Eastern Europe and the Baltic Sea were traded to elite households in Byzantium and the Islamic world via the Dnieper and Volga river systems, the Carolingian Empire and Venice. Arabic merchants from the Caspian Sea and Byzantine merchants from the Black Sea bought their goods to the trade markets in Rus, where they met the Viking traders and warriors known as Varangians, and traded their goods for the slaves captured by the Vikings in Europe.

The Vikings used the demand for slaves in the Southern slave markets in the Orthodox Byzantine Empire and the Islamic Middle Eastern Caliphate, both of whom craved slaves of a different religion than their own. During the Middle Ages, organized alongside religious principles. Both Christians and Muslims banned the enslavement of people of their own faith, but both approved of the enslavement of people of a different faith; both did allow the enslavement of people they regarded to be heretics, which allowed Catholic Christians to enslave Orthodox Christians, and Sunni Muslims to enslave Shia Muslims. However, both Christians and Muslims approved of enslaving Pagans, who came to be a preferred target of the slave trade in the Middle Ages, and Pagan war captives were sold by Pagan enemies into the slave trade.

=== The Viking slave trade ===
The Vikings trafficked European slaves captured in Viking raids in Europe in the East in two destinations from present day Russia via the Volga trade route; one to Slavery in the Abbasid Caliphate in the Middle East via the Caspian Sea, the Samanid slave trade and Iran; and one to the Byzantine Empire and the Mediterranean via Dnieper and the Black Sea slave trade. Until the 9th century, the Vikings trafficked Baltic and Finnic European slaves from the Baltic Sea in the Northeastern Europe via the Wisla or the Donau rivers South East through Europe to the Black Sea. The Viking slave route was redirected in the 9th century, and until the 11th century the Vikings trafficked European slaves from the Baltic Sea via Ladoga, Novgorod and the Msta river via the Route from the Varangians to the Greeks to the Byzantine Empire via the Black Sea slave trade, or to the Abbasid Caliphate via the Caspian Sea (and the Bukhara slave trade) via the Volga trade route.

People taken captive during the Viking raids across Europe could be sold to Moorish Spain via the Dublin slave trade or transported to Hedeby or Brännö and from there via the Volga trade route to present day Russia, where slaves and furs were sold to Muslim merchants in exchange for Arab silver dirham and silk, which have been found in Birka, Wollin and Dublin; initially this trade route between Europe and the Abbasid Caliphate passed via the Khazar Kaghanate, but from the early 10th-century onward it went via Volga Bulgaria and from there by caravan to Khwarazm, to the Samanid slave market in Central Asia and finally via Iran to the Abbasid Caliphate.

Archbishop Rimbert of Bremen (d. 888) reported that he witnessed a "large throng of captured Christians being hauled away" in the Viking port of Hedeby in Denmark, one of whom was a woman who sang psalms to identify herself as a Christian nun, and who the bishop was able to free by exchanging his horse for her freedom.

This trade was the source of the Arab dirham silver hoards found in Scandinavia and functioned from at least 786 until 1009, when such coins have been found there, and it would have been so lucrative that it contributed to the continuing Viking raids across Eastern Europe, which was used by the Vikings as a slave supply source for this trade with the Islamic world. Among such hoards can be mentioned the Spillings Hoard and the Sundveda Hoard.

One of the only accounts describing Norse slave practices in detail and first person is the Arabic merchant Ibn Fadlan meeting Volga Vikings. Describing Swedish Vikings using the Volga trade route using Saqaliba or Slavic slaves as translators when trading. There he describes the Norse ship burials only known in Norse society before the Viking expansion in 800 AD into present day Russia and Ukraine and that a slave girl was sacrificed to follow her master. Norse burials found in Sweden and Norway indicate that slaves were sacrificed in Sweden to follow their masters to the afterlife. However, Swedish archaeology shows that mostly male slaves were killed to follow their master into the afterlife and not females. The grave of an aristocratic Swedish woman, the Princess of Öland, also include the remains of a male who may have been a slave. Sacrificed female slaves have however been found sacrificed in Norway, where a woman found in the grave showed signs of having her throat slit in a similar manner to the execution described by Ibn Fadlan.

During the 11th century, the Viking nations of Denmark, Norway and Sweden became Christian, which made it impossible for them to continue to conduct slave raids toward Christian Europe, and consequently Viking slave raiding across Europe declined. The establishment of Kievan Rus likely also decreased the number of slaves taken in raids and limited it to the local market for slaves in Sweden, according to Lena Björkman.

=== Abolition ===
Slavery in Sweden appear to have gradually phased out during the 13th century. The Christian church did not approve of the enslavement of Christians. Giving freedom to a slave was seen as a holy act, giving the nobleman more of a chance to reach heaven, and it appeared to have become a custom to free slaves by will, gradually decreased the number of slaves. Since there were by the 13th-century fewer Pagan lands where Christians could legitimately acquire new slaves, there were no way to increase the number of slaves. There was no serfdom in Sweden, and consequently all farmers, rich and poor were free. While poorer farmers probably did not have the financial option as rich noblemen had, this possibly means that farmers or freemen were the last to free their slaves

In parallel with the increasing manumission-wills of slaves during the 13th-century, different parts of Sweden started to ban slavery within their counties, while it remained legal in others. The last document mentioning a slave in Sweden is a will from 1310, which manumitted the male slave Karelus. Thralldom was finally outlawed by King Magnus IV of Sweden in 1335. In practice, the 1335 was the abolition of slavery in the Counties of Västergötland and Värend, but since slavery had already been prohibited in the rest of the counties before, the 1335 ban in the only two counties where slavery remained legal, also meant the final abolition of slavery in Sweden as a whole. In reality, there would have been very few slaves left in Sweden by the time of its final abolition, and it is seen as likely that all had already been manumitted by that point.

== Swedish slavery and slave trade in the early modern period ==
=== Trading stations in Africa ===
In 1650, Sweden established trading stations along the West African coast, with bases in an area called the Swedish Gold Coast which was later a part of the West African Gold Coast, and which is today part of Ghana. Sweden and Denmark were competing for positions as regional powers during this period, and the Danes followed the Swedes to Africa, setting up stations a couple of years later. In 1663, the Swedish Gold Coast was taken over by the Danish colonial power and became part of the Danish Gold Coast. There is no historical documentation that shows that slaves were ever traded in the trading stations during their 13-year Swedish possession.

Swedish trading stations reappeared in the 18th century, when Sweden established a colonial presence in the Caribbean.

=== Slavery in the Barbary Coast ===
There were over 1,500 Swedish slaves in the Barbary Coast as victims of the Barbary slave trade. Many would never see their homeland again. The Turks also frequently castrated their slaves. The Ottomans also bought black sex slaves from the Swedes.

No slave raids was ever conducted by corsairs towards the coasts of Sweden. However, Swedish and Finnish ships (Finland was a part of Sweden) were attacked by corsairs in the sea outside of Western Europe and in the Mediterranean.

On 20 November 1662 the Lord High Treasurer of Sweden, Magnus Gabriel De la Gardie received a letter of appeal from eight Swedish sailors who had been abducted by corsairs at sea and was being held in slavery in Algiers.

The Swede Johan Gabriel Sparfwenfeldt, who visited Algiers and Tunis in 1691, described empathically how he had met and spoken to many Swedish slaves who asked him for help to be bought free and return to "their homes, to their children, their parents and the land of their home", and listed 23 names of the Swedes then held as slaves.

Sweden attempted to protect their ships by use of insurance against slavery, convoys, international treaties and by maintaining friendly contact with the corsairs. The captives were also bought free by their relatives. This did not only apply to slaves from rich families: many poor women are known to have collected money to buy their husbands and sons free. In one instance, the young sailor Erik Persson Ångerman was enslaved in Algiers after being captured from the ship Wibus from Stockholm on 10 May 1725. He sent a letter to his wife Maria Olssdotter via his colleague Petter Wallberg (who had been bought free and was returning to Sweden) and told her he "sat in hard slavery" in Algiers. Maria Olssdotter had no funds to buy his freedom, but appealed to Frederick I via the governor of Gävle for money to be gathered in the churches for the purchase of her enslaved husband, and her application was approved; this was not an unusual case, as many poor women are known to have done the same.

Almost all Swedes and Finns who were captured by the corsairs at sea were sailors. Between about 500 and 1000 Swedish citizens were enslaved by the corsairs between 1650 and 1763.

One of the Swedish victims of the Barbary slave trade was Marcus Berg (1714-1761).

Sweden together with, the United States of America and Kingdom of Sicily, would intervene in 1801 to free Swedish, American and Sicilian slaves from the Barbary Coast. In the First Barbary War three Swedish ship would partake to free Swedish slaves.

=== Slave trade under King Gustav III ===
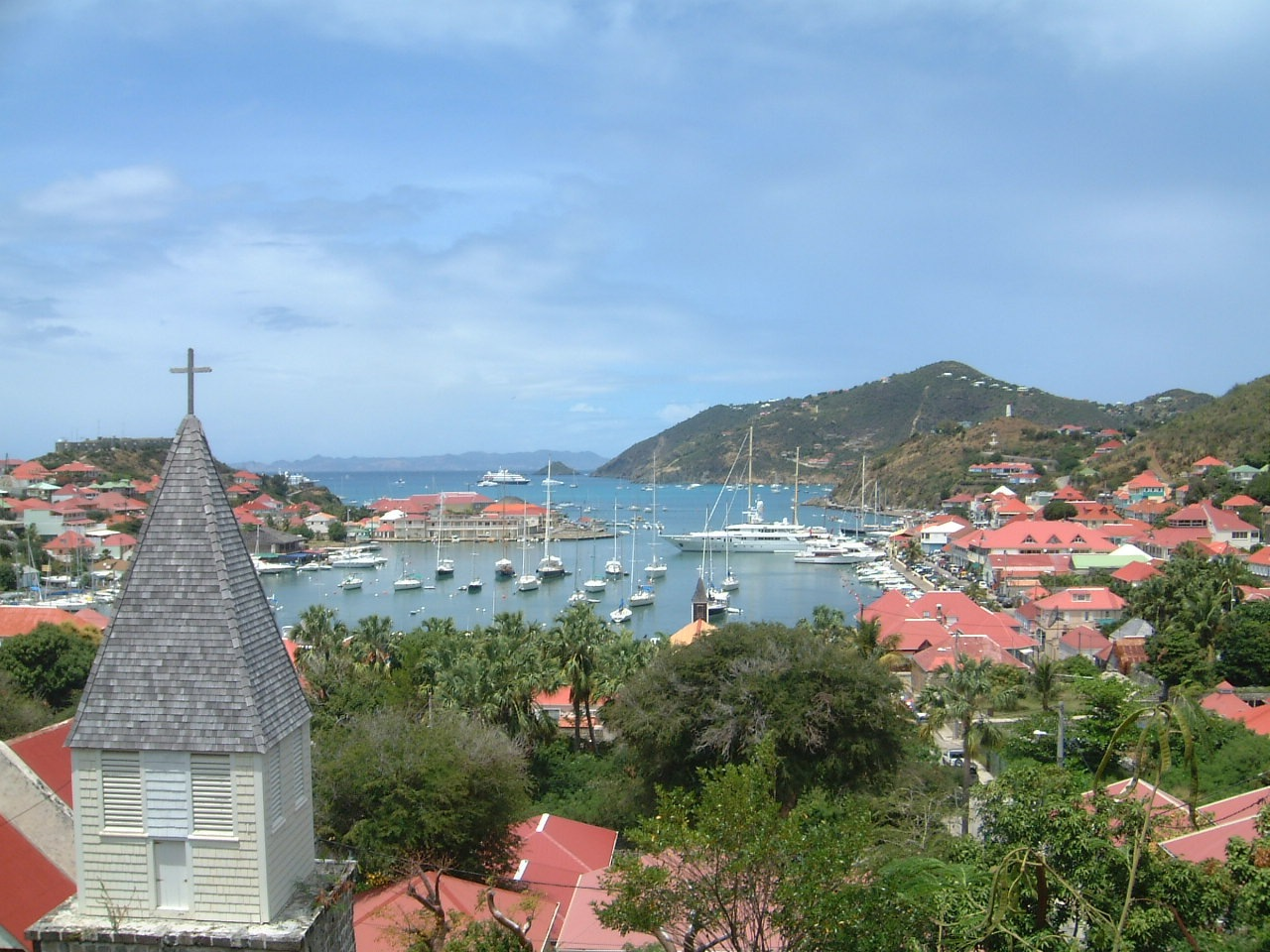
Gustavia harbor, Saint-Barthélemy, present day

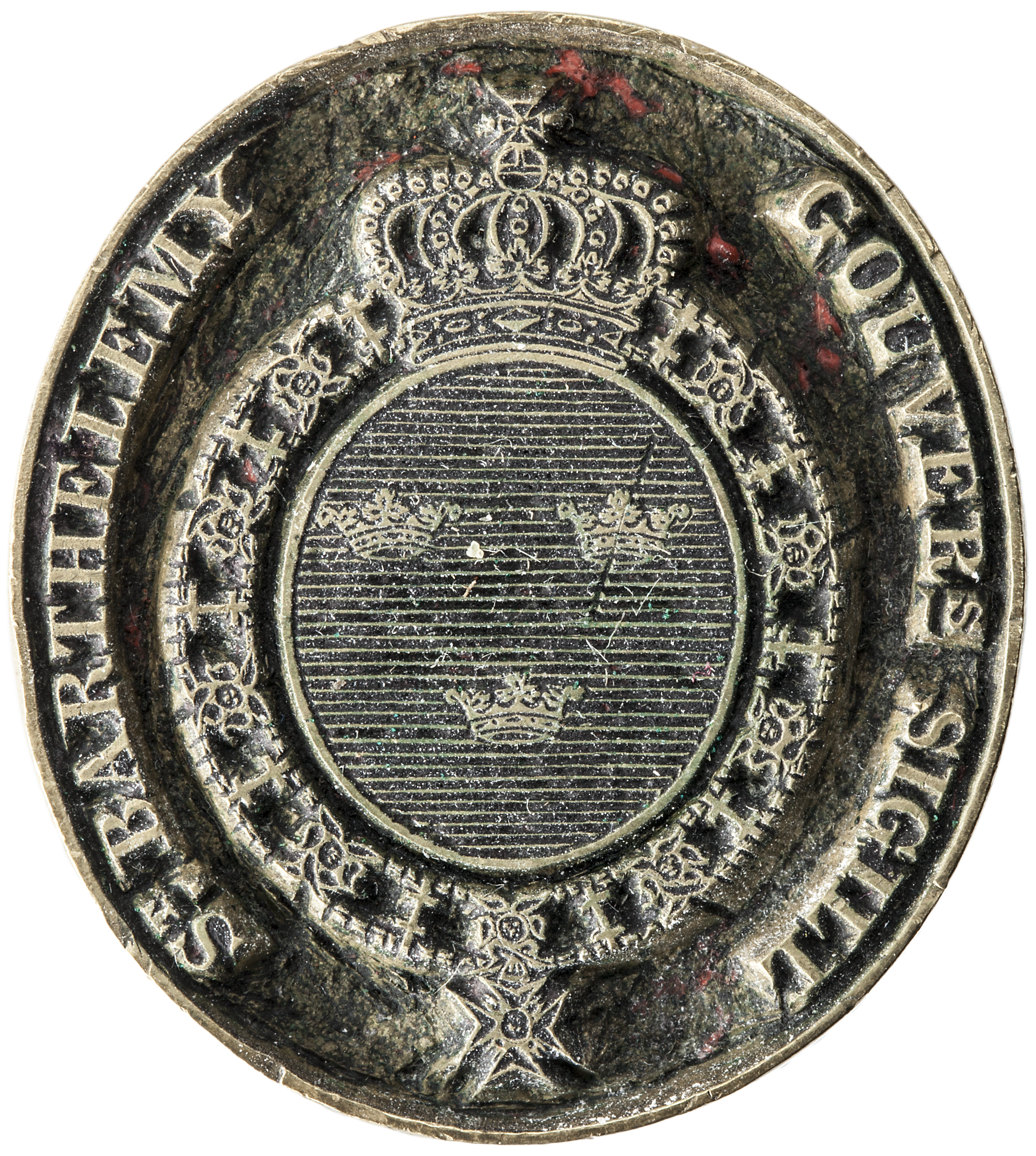
Seal of the governor of the Swedish colony, 1784–1877.

In 1771, Gustav III became the King of Sweden. He wanted Sweden to re-establish itself as a European "Great Power". Overseas colonies were a symbol of power and prestige at that time, so he decided to acquire colonies for Sweden. Denmark-Norway received large revenues from its colonies in the West Indies, so in 1784, Gustav acquired the West Indian island of Saint-Barthélemy from France.

On 23 August 1784, the king informed the Privy Council that Sweden now owned an island in the West Indies. This apparently came as a surprise for many of the Councilors. The first report concerning the island came from Simon Bérard, Swedish consul-general in L'Orient, the only town. He reported that:

It (Saint-Barthélemy) is a very insignificant island, without strategic position. It is very poor and dry, with a very small population. Only salt and cotton is produced there. A large part of the island is made up of sterile rocks. The island has no sweet water; all the wells on the island give only brackish water. Water has to be imported from neighbouring islands. There are no roads anywhere.

According to Bérard, there was no possibility of agriculture because of the poor soil. The island's one desirable feature was a good harbor.

Bérard recommended that the island be made a free port. At that time, France had trouble providing sufficient slaves to its colonies in the area. Sweden could try to export a certain number of slaves to the French colonies in the region each year.

If Saint-Barthélemy was a success, Sweden could later expand its colonial empire to more islands in the area. Gustav also knew that the leading slave trading nations in Europe made large amounts of money from it.

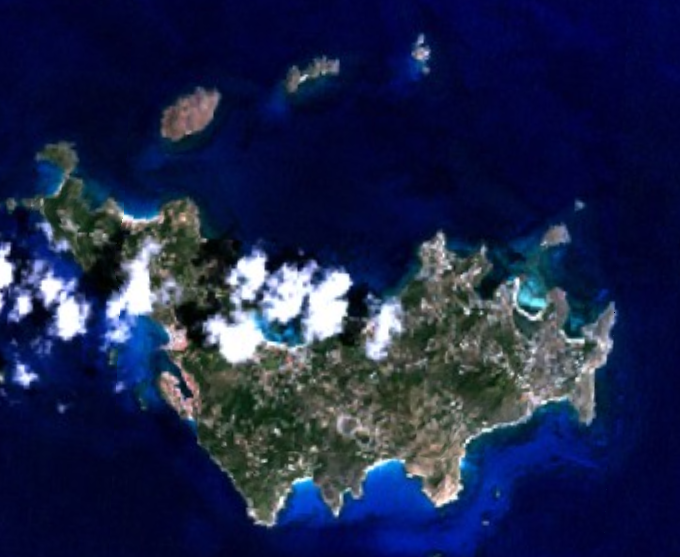
Saint Barthélemy – NASA NLT Landsat 7 satellite photo

In the autumn of 1786, the Swedish West India Company was established on the island. Gustav told investors that they could expect big profits in the future. Anyone who could afford it was allowed to buy shares, but Gustav kept 10 per cent of the shares for himself, which made him the largest shareholder. The king received one-quarter of all profits of the company and the other shareholders three quarters, even though the king owned only 10 per cent of the company.

On 31 October of the same year, a privilege letter was made for the West India Company. The company was granted the right to trade slaves between Africa and the West Indies. Paragraph 14 in the letter states: "The Company is free to operate slave trade in Angola and the African coast, where such is permitted."

On 12 March 1790, a new custom tax and constitution were introduced to the island. Both were designed to make Saint-Barthélemy into a haven for slave traders. The new laws gave astonishing opportunities for traders from all over the world.

There was no duty on slaves imported from Africa to Saint-Barthélemy: "Free import of slaves and trade with black slaves or so called new Negroes from Africa is granted to all nations without having to pay any charge at the unload."

People from all over the Caribbean came to buy slaves. The government charged a small export duty on slaves sold from Saint-Barthélemy to foreign colonies. This duty was halved for slaves imported from Africa on Swedish ships, generating increased profits for the West India Company and other Swedish traders.

The new constitution stated: "Freedom for all on Saint Bartholomew living and arriving to arm and send out ships and shipments to Africa to buy slaves on the places thus is permitted for all nations. That way a new branch for the Swedish trade in Africa and the Coast of Guinea should arise."

In 1813, Sweden was awarded control of Guadeloupe, a nearby French colony temporarily under British occupation. In 1814, though, with the fall of Napoleon, Sweden gave the island back to France.

One of the few African slaves bought to actual Sweden proper was Gustav Badin. He was taken to Sweden from the Danish Caribbean and gifted to the queen, Louisa Ulrika of Prussia, as a child; upon his arrival within Swedish borders, he automatically became free, since slavery did not exist as a legal state in Sweden. Badin was taught to read and write and instructed in religion but was otherwise allowed to live as he pleased, free from corporal punishment otherwise customary for children at the time, in order to test the ideas about the Noble savage of the time. Badin was baptised, married, and had a long career as a trusted member of the court.

=== Abolition ===
In 1788, the British Committee for the Abolition of Slavery sent a Swedish opponent of the slave trade, Anders Sparrman, to Gustav III. The committee feared that other nations would expand their trade if Britain stopped its own. They sent books about the issue and a letter, in which the king was encouraged to hinder his subjects to participate in this disgraceful trade. In the response letter, delivered through Sparrman, he wrote that no one in the country had participated in the slave trade and that he would do all that he could to keep them from doing so.

During the early 19th century, movements against slavery became stronger, especially in Britain. Slave trade was outlawed in Britain in 1807, and in the United States in 1808, after which other countries started to follow suit. Sweden made the slave trade illegal as part of the Treaty of Stockholm with Britain in 1813, but allowed slavery until 9 October 1847.

During the 19th century, the British Admiralty patrolled the African coast to catch illegal slave traders. The Swedish vessel Diana was intercepted by the British authorities close to the coast of Africa while engaged in carrying slaves from Africa to Saint Bartholomew during this period. The case was taken to court in order to test if the slave trade could be considered contrary to the general law of nations. However, the vessel was returned to the Swedish owners on the ground that Sweden had not prohibited the trade and tolerated it in practice.

Once the slave trade became a hot issue, the Swedish government abandoned the slave trade in the Caribbean, but did not initially outlaw slavery. The West Indian colony became financial burdens. The island of Guadeloupe was returned to France in 1814, in return for a compensation in the sum of 24 million francs. A Guadeloupe Fund was established in Sweden for the benefit of the Swedish Crown Prince and Regent Charles XIV John of Sweden, born Jean-Baptiste Bernadotte, a French national and former Marshal of France under Napoleon I. He and his heirs were paid 300,000 riksdaler per year up until 1983 in compensation for their loss of prestige in France when Sweden joined Britain against France in the Napoleonic War. In Saint Bartholomew, the Swedish government bought the remaining slaves to give them freedom. According to Herman Lindqvist in Aftonbladet (8 October 2006), 523 slaves were bought free for 80 riksdaler per slave.

Exactly how many slaves were brought to the New World on Swedish ships is not known, since most of the archives documents have not been investigated, and many of them are by now not accessible because of their bad preservation. Nevertheless, some data, mostly concerning the former Swedish island Saint-Barthélemy, is now available online.

== In popular culture ==
Johan Vilde is a Comic series awarded with best comic book of the year in Sweden 1976. It contains several comics that depict the life of Johan Vilde that by unfortunate circumstances winds up as a Swedish slave. During the height of the Swedish slave trade in Africa.

Vilde falls overboard of his Swedish ship and winds up in an African tribe that takes care of him. They become his foster family. Then a rival more warlike tribe with the help of European guns defeats them and sells him and his foster family into slavery in the Swedish slave fort of Christina. The Swedes mistake Vilde for an albino African and decides to sell him even thou he looks white. The plot then continues and revolves around Swedish slave traders.

== See also ==
- Racism in Finland
- Racism in Sweden
- Nordic colonialism
- Swedish overseas colonies
- Saint Barthélemy
- Slavery
- Thrall
- Triangular trade
- Slave Trade Act 1807
