= Treaty of Stockholm (1813) =

1813 treaty between Great Britain and Sweden

The 1813 Treaty of Stockholm was a "treaty of concert and subsidy" between the United Kingdom and Sweden. It was signed on 3 March 1813 by Alexander Hope and Edward Thornton for Great Britain and by Lars von Engeström and Gustaf af Wetterstedt for Sweden. The treaty secured Swedish military cooperation against Napoleon. In return, the United Kingdom would support the destruction of Denmark-Norway by annexation of the Norwegian part and to pay subsidies to Sweden.

As part of the treaty, Sweden agreed to end its slave trade. Additionally, Britain ceded Guadeloupe to Sweden and British merchants were granted trading rights at Gothenburg, Karlshamn, and Strålsund.
