= Racism in Sweden =

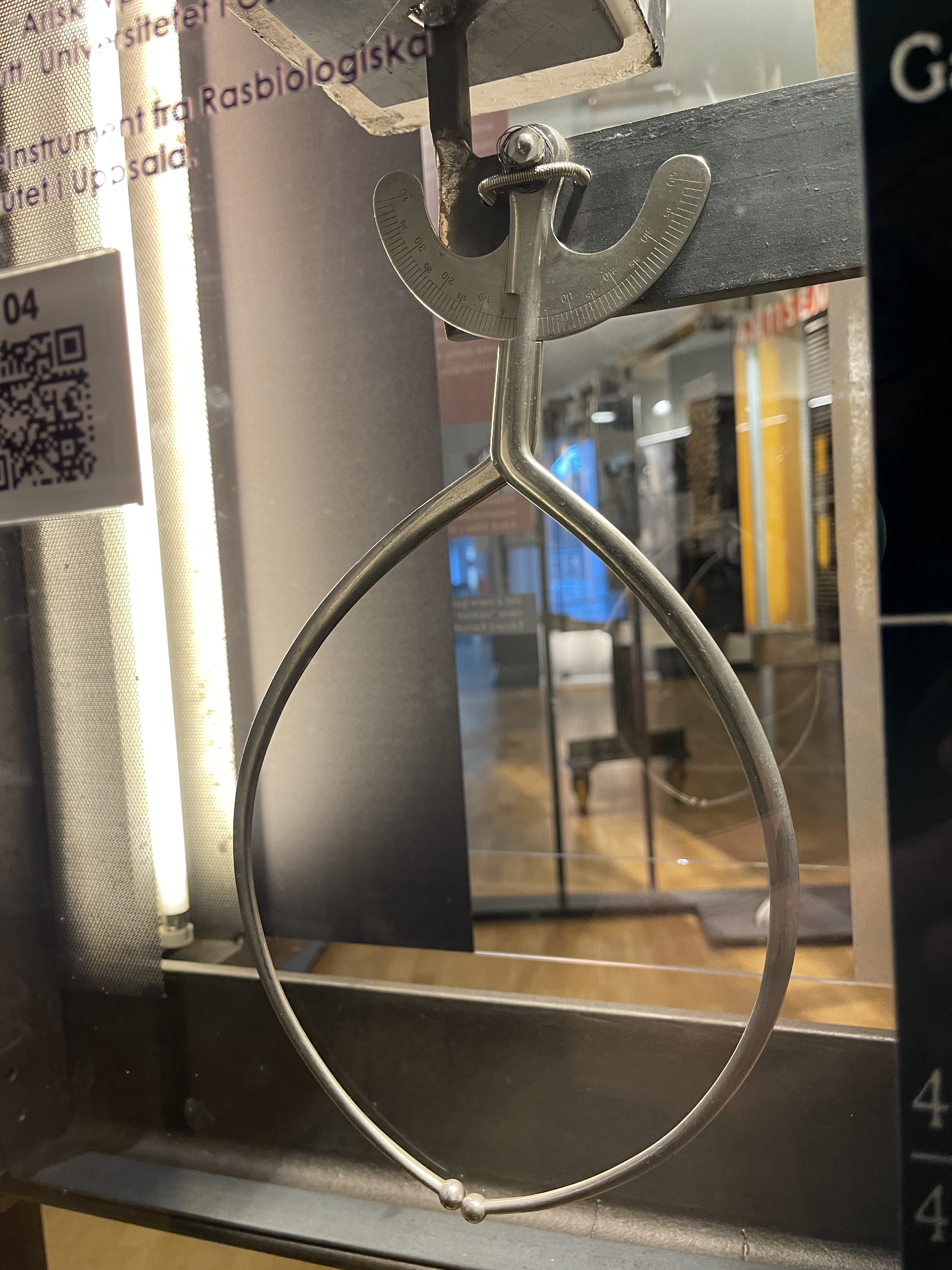
A handheld instrument for measuring human skulls, used by the State Institute for Racial Biology, an institution founded in 1922 dedicated to researching eugenics, genetics, and scientific racism

Racism and xenophobia have been reported and investigated in Sweden. Sweden has the most segregated labor market of people with foreign background in Europe, when measured against both high and low educational level by OECD statistics. According to the European Network Against Racism, skin color and ethnic/religious background have significant impact on an individual's opportunities in the labor market.

Due to increased immigration from Muslim majority countries in the 21st century, Islamophobia in Sweden has increased with anti-immigration views growing stronger in the country. The country has also recorded instances of antisemitism, which has increased in recent years because members of the increased Muslim population have targeted Jews. Several white supremacist and neo-Nazi organizations are also active in Sweden, including the Nordic Resistance Movement.

== Racism ==
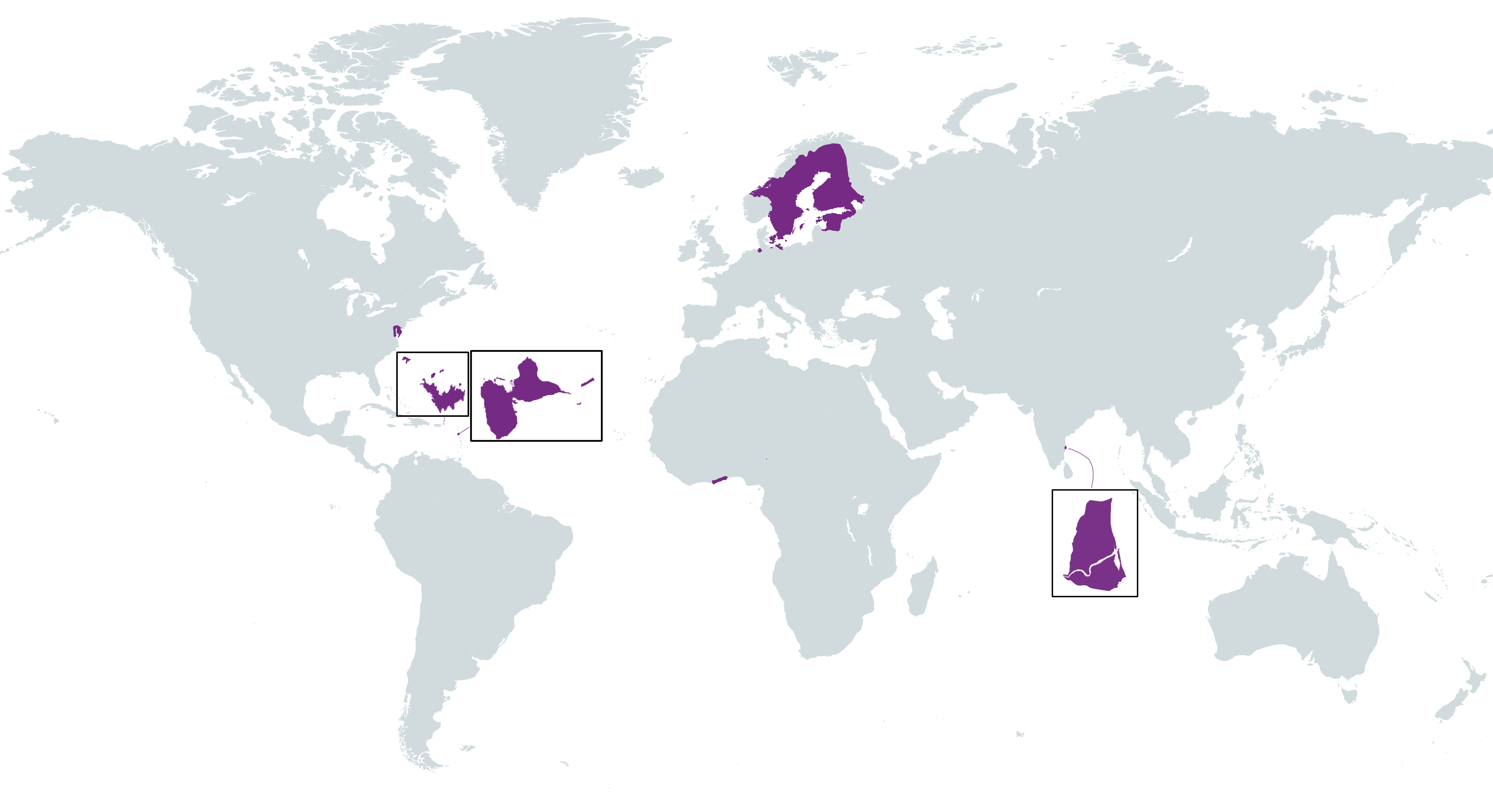
Swedish Colonial Empire and its protectorates

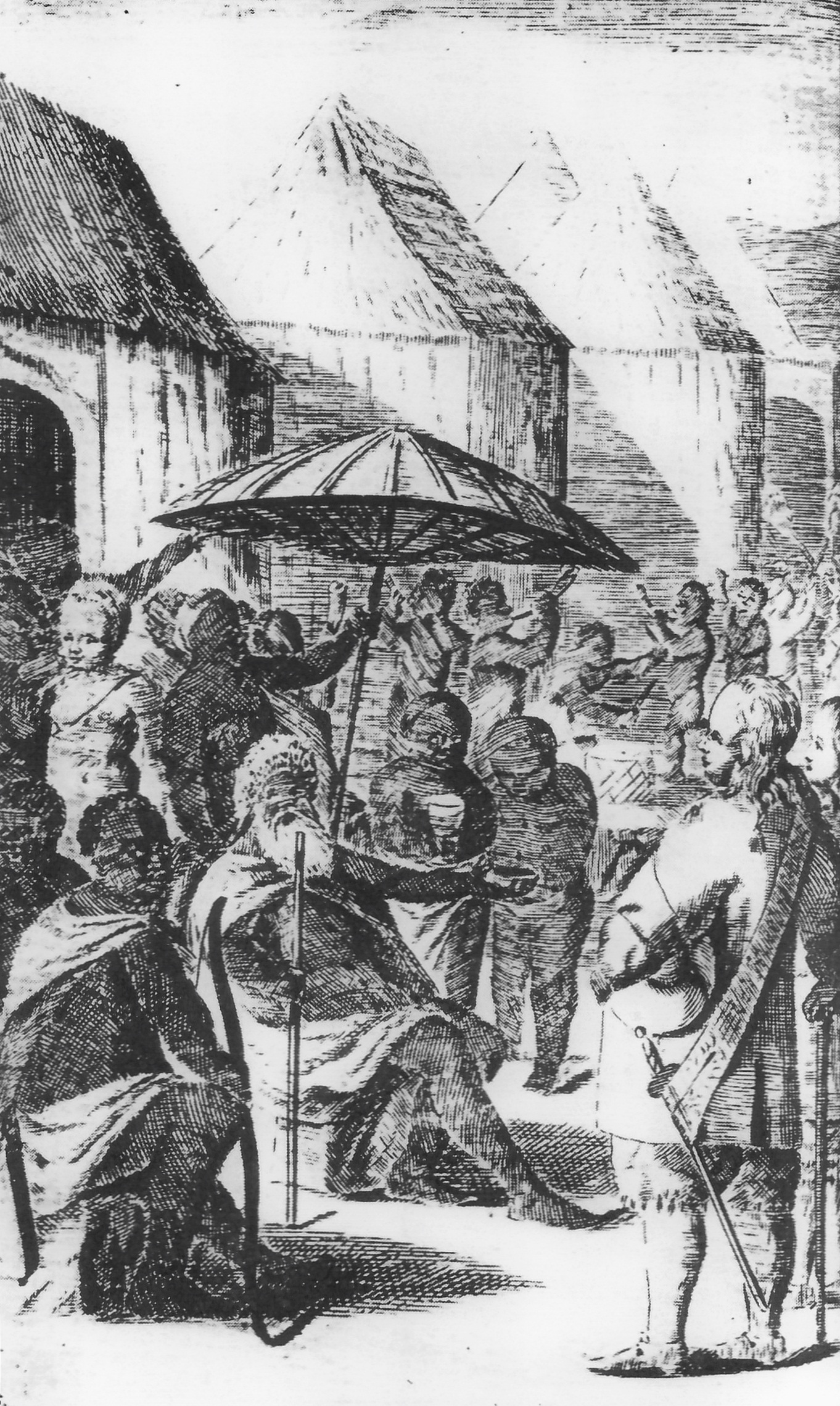
The Swedish are invited by the Akan King of Futu to erect a "stony house" for the purpose of trade, Swedish Gold Coast, 17th century.

Anti-Black and anti-Indigenous racism in Sweden are rooted in the history of the Swedish colonization of the Indigenous Sámi people, the Swedish slave trade, and Swedish colonialism in Africa, North America, and Asia, as well as Swedish government promotion of racist ideologies. Swedish colonization of Sámi land began in the 14th century and intensified in the 17th century when the Swedish state encouraged settlers from the south to move to the north. Due to Swedish state policy, Sámi people have historically been "denied their rights" and "the Sami identity has been defined on the basis of stigmatising and racist conceptions." Swedish colonies included the Swedish Gold Coast in what is now Ghana, the Swedish colony of Saint Barthélemy, and New Sweden in what is now Delaware, Pennsylvania, Maryland, and New Jersey.

In 2021, the Church of Sweden apologized for its abuse of Sámi people over several centuries, including forcible Christianization, the mistreatment of children in Sámi schools, and collecting the remains of Sámi people for research on scientific racism and eugenics. The Church of Sweden described their "dark actions" against the Sámi as "colonial" and "legitimized repression". Prior to apologizing, the Church of Sweden had produced a 1,100 page long document in 2019 compiling the church's history of oppressing Sámi people and erasing Sámi culture.

The Swedish role in colonialism and the enslavement of Africans has been characterized as being "little known" by the general Swedish public, despite the persistence of reminders of slavery and colonialism in Swedish art, architecture, and placenames. During the 20th century, the State Institute for Racial Biology was active in promoting eugenics and scientific racism within Swedish society. In 2022, following a five day visit to Sweden, the United Nations International Independent Expert Mechanism stated that the Swedish government needed to develop strategies to address systemic racism.

Romani people have also been historically discriminated against in Sweden.

== Islamophobia ==
The report Racism and Xenophobia in Sweden by the Board of Integration state that Muslims are exposed to the most religious harassment in Sweden. Almost 40% of the interviewed said they had witnessed verbal abuse directed at Muslims. Historically, attitudes towards Muslims in Sweden have been mixed with relations being largely negative in the early 16th century, improving in the 18th century, and declining once again with the rise of Swedish nationalism in the early 20th century. According to Jonas Otterbeck, a Swedish historian of religion, attitudes towards Islam and Muslims today have improved but "the level of prejudice was and is still high". Islamophobia can manifest itself through discrimination in the workforce, prejudiced coverage in the media, and violence against Muslims.

== Nazism ==
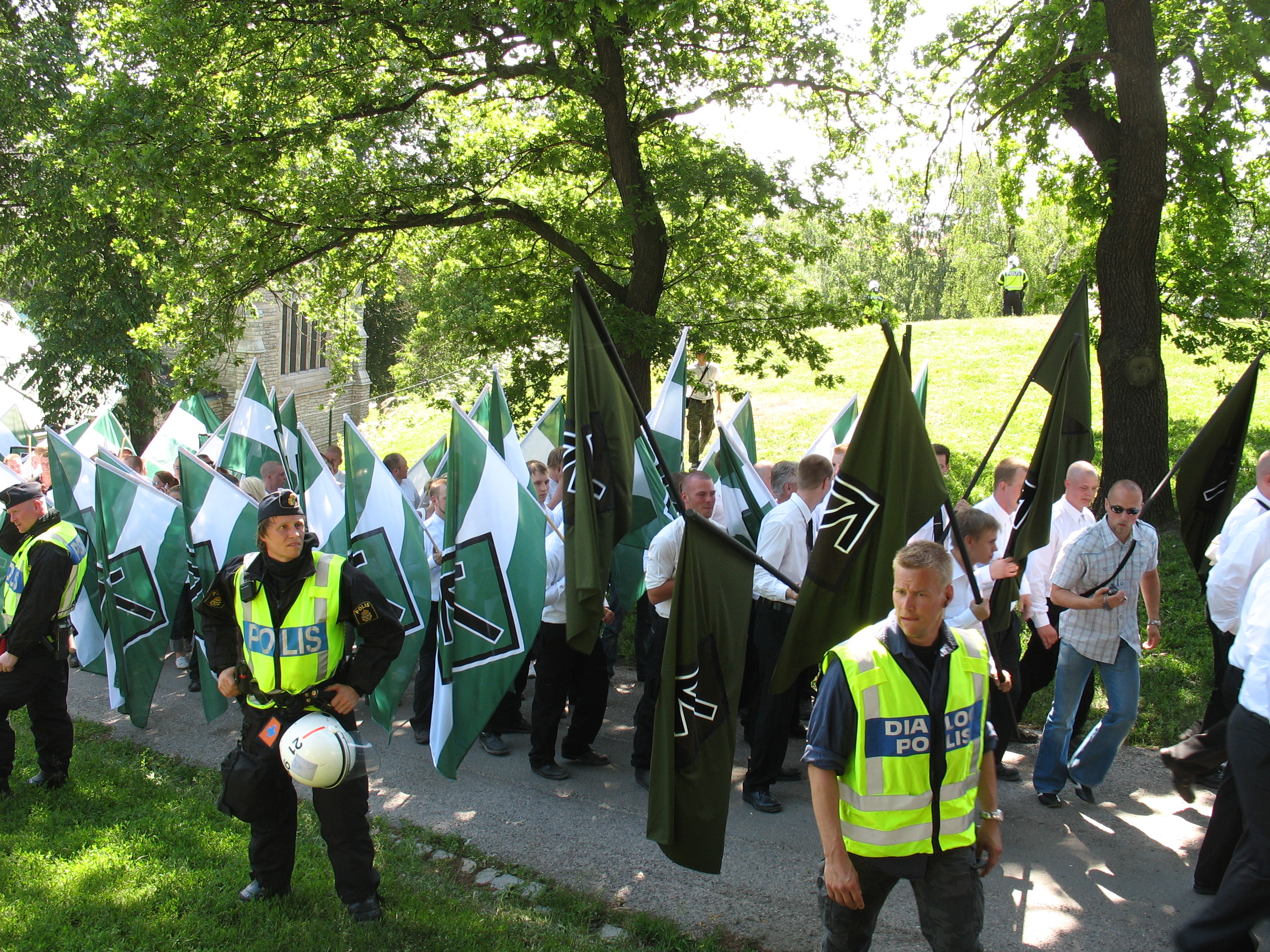
Nordic Resistance Movement demonstration in Stockholm, June 2007

Sweden is home to several white supremacist and neo-Nazi organizations, including:

- Swedish Resistance Movement, the Swedish branch of the Nordic Resistance Movement

Former organizations and parties include:

- National Alliance
- National Socialist Front
- National Youth
- Party of the Swedes
- White Aryan Resistance
- The Nordic Realm Party
- Legion Wasa

The Nordic Resistance Movement has been noted as a leading neo-Nazi organization in Sweden, exporting extremism throughout Scandinavia and maintaining ties with extremist groups elsewhere in Europe, South Africa, and North America. Contemporary white supremacist groups are part of a century-long history of Nazi and neo-Nazi activism in Sweden.

The right-wing populist Sweden Democrats, the second largest party in the Riksdag, was founded by far right activists who were involved in neo-Nazi, white supremacist, and fascist movements, including one co-founder who had been a Waffen-SS volunteer. The parties advocates Swedish nationalism and immigration restrictions. The party has since claimed and been described to have rejected racism and extremism, instead endorsing "cultural nationalism". Party members claim that since 2005, when Jimmie Åkesson became party leader, that the party had undergone reforms. Critics accuse the party of having not completely rejected its fascist history, with anti-fascists alleging that the party remains racist and neo-Nazi.

== Antisemitism ==
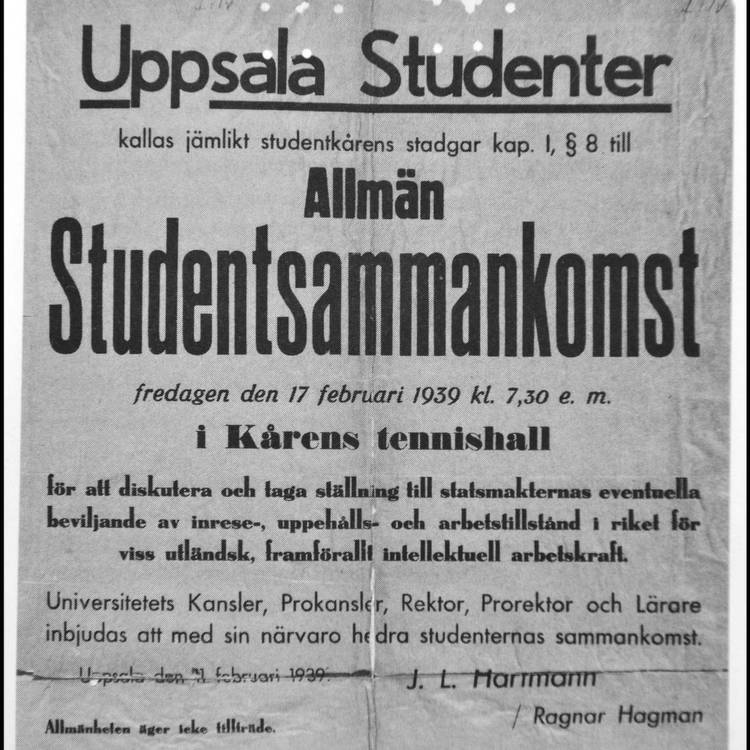
Invitation to a meeting at Bollhuset, where nationalist students agitated against German-Jewish refugee physicians living in Sweden, February 1939

Following Germany and Austria, Sweden has the highest rate of antisemitic incidents in Europe, although the Netherlands has reported a higher rate of antisemitism for some years. A government commissioned study from 2006 estimated that 15% of Swedes agree with the statement: "The Jews have too much influence in the world today." A multinational public-opinion study that was carried out by the American Jewish Committee in March – April 2005 (Thinking about the Holocaust 60 Years Later) shows how the view that Jews exert "too much influence" on world events is more prevalent in Poland, Austria and Germany than in Sweden, but also indicates that Swedes agree with this statement to a similar extent as Americans and the British. In reference to the statement that the Jews "exploit" the Holocaust for their own purposes, the same study indicates that this view is more prevalent amongst Swedes than amongst Americans and the British but equally as prevalent amongst Austrians and the French. 5% of the total adult population and 39% of adult Muslims "harbour systematic antisemitic views". The former prime minister Göran Persson described these results as "surprising and terrifying". However, the rabbi of Stockholm's Orthodox Jewish community, Meir Horden, said that "It's not true to say that the Swedes are anti-Semitic. Some of them are hostile to Israel because they support the weak side, which they perceive the Palestinians to be." Further, a new study conducted by the ADL showed greatly contrasting results with Swedish respondents indicating antisemitic tendencies among a mere 4% of the population.

A record of 60 antisemitic attacks were reported in 2012 in the city of Malmö, up from an average 22 in the two years before that. 35 cases were reported in the first half of 2013, making it on pace to break the record. The Jewish community say that radical members of the Muslim population in the city are responsible for most of the attacks. According to a survey conducted by the Fundamental Rights Agency, in 40% of serious antisemitic harassment incidents the perpetrator was identified as someone with a Muslim extremist ideology.

== See also ==
- Anti-Finnish sentiment
- Nordicism
- Scandinavian colonialism
- Anti-Romani sentiment#Sweden

== Sources ==
- Otterbeck, Jonas (Spring 2002). "The Depiction of Islam in Sweden: An Historical Overview" (PDF). Muslim World. 92 (1/2): 143–156. doi:10.1111/j.1478-1913.2002.tb03737.x.
