= Anti-Sámi sentiment =

Form of anti-Indigenous racism in Europe

Anti-Sámi sentiment is prejudice, discrimination or racism against the Indigenous Sámi people of Sápmi. Anti-Sámi sentiment is most commonly found in Norway, Sweden, Finland, Denmark and Russia, where Sámi people have a history of being a minority group. Anti-Sámi sentiment has manifested in the form of colonization of Sámi lands, dislocation, forcible Christianization, and assimilation through Norwegianization policies and Sámi schools. The Church of Sweden apologized in 2022 for its history of anti-Sámi persecution.

== Denmark ==
Although Sámi people are not Indigenous to contemporary Denmark, they are Indigenous to parts of northern Norway in the Sápmi region that were once part of Denmark–Norway. The Dano-Norwegian government colonized Sámi land and encouraged settlers to move to Sápmi. Sámi activists have requested that a sacred drum that was confiscated by the Danish government after a 1691 witchcraft trial be granted Sámi ownership, campaigning for four decades. The sacred drum was owned by the Danish royal family before being given to the National Museum of Denmark, which had then loaned the drum to the Sámi Museum in Karasjok, Norway. Sámi activists wanted the drum to be given formal ownership by the museum. In 2022, after three centuries, the drum was granted permanent ownership by the Sámi Museum where it is displayed.

== Finland ==
According to ECRI, the majority of people in Finland don't know enough about the Sámi people and are not taught enough about Sámi history and culture in school. ECRI has criticized Finland for not having ratified the ILO-convention 169 on Indigenous and Tribal Peoples.

According to the sixth ECRI report on Finland in 2025, hate speech against the Sámi has increased, especially online. Sámi Parliament representatives and Sámi activists are frequently targeted. Online hostility has intensified during public debates concerning Sámi issues, including land use in the Sámi homeland and the amendments to the Sámi Parliament Act, passed in June 2025. These amendments increase Sámi self-determination and revise the criteria for the electoral rolls of the Sámi Parliament of Finland.

Many Finnish people believe that Finns played little or no role in colonialism, a view known as "Finnish exceptionalism". However, Finns settled Sámi land in the north. Finns at the time were subjects of Sweden and later the Russian Empire, which has been used to excuse their participation in colonialism.

== Norway ==
=== Middle Ages ===
In medieval times, Sàmi people were sometimes associated with trolls by Norse writers, for example in Hrafnistumannasögur, Samì descendent people were either called trolls or half-trolls. Another example is in the saga of Heimskringla, in which a Sámi woman, Snæfríðr Svásadóttir, is married to King Harald Fairhair. After her death, her body is left undecayed, however upon touch numerous "foul creatures" come out of it and the body turns completely black. This leans into yet another racist belief towards Sàmi people which lasted for many centuries, that of corruption associated with Sámi people and magic. In the saga of Íslendingasögur, these elements are also present, with characters nicknamed "hálftrǫll" and half-bergrísi (half mountain-giants).

=== Modern era ===
The Indigenous Sámi people of Northern Norway have inhabited the region of Sápmi for many centuries. Beginning in the 15th and 16th centuries, Norwegian farmers began to colonize Sámi land. The Norwegian government would later encourage the colonization of Sámi land and the assimilation of Sámi people through policies known as "Norwegianization".

=== Contemporary Era ===
On 2 February 1869, the Norwegian government made a statement about the "Sàmi question" and its economic impact, stating: "the nomadic culture is such a great burden for Norway […] one must unconditionally desire its cessation" in reference to Sàmi people's culture and customs.

For many years, Sámi skeletons were kept in the collections of the Anatomical Institute at the University of Oslo, including the skeletons of Mons Somby and Aslak Hætta. The skeletons were repatriated in 1997. The Sámi attempt to have their ancestors' remains repatriated is the subject of the 1999 documentary Give Us Our Skeletons.

== Russia ==
In July, 2024, the Russian government labelled dozens of Indigenous organizations as extremist organizations, including some Sámi organizations. Russian repression of Sámi activists caused some to hide their Sámi identity or flee to the Nordic countries.

== Sweden ==
Anti-Indigenous racism in Sweden is rooted in the history of the Swedish colonization of the Indigenous Sámi people as well as Swedish government promotion of racist ideologies. Swedish colonization of Sámi land began in the 14th century and intensified in the 17th century when the Swedish state encouraged settlers from the south to move to the north. Due to Swedish state policy, Sámi people have historically been "denied their rights" and "the Sami identity has been defined on the basis of stigmatising and racist conceptions."

In 2021, the Church of Sweden apologized for its abuse of Sámi people over several centuries, including forcible Christianization, the mistreatment of children in Sámi schools, and collecting the remains of Sámi people for research on scientific racism and eugenics. The Church of Sweden described their "dark actions" against the Sámi as "colonial" and "legitimized repression". Prior to apologizing, the Church of Sweden had produced a 1,100 page long document in 2019 compiling the church's history of oppressing Sámi people and erasing Sámi culture.

== See also ==
- Genocide of indigenous peoples
- Racism in Denmark
- Racism in Finland
- Racism in Norway
- Racism in Russia
- Racism in Sweden
- State Institute for Racial Biology
