= Nordic colonialism =

Nordic colonialism is a subdivision within broader colonial studies that discusses the role of Nordic nations in achieving economic benefits from outside of their own cultural sphere. The field ranges from studying the Sámi in relation to the Norwegian, Swedish, Finnish and states, to activities of the Danish colonial empire and Swedish Empire in Africa, Greenland, New Sweden, and on Caribbean islands such as St. Thomas and Saint-Barthélemy.

== Overview ==
=== Iceland ===
Some consider Norse Vikings to be the first Europeans to create colonies in the Americas. The arrival of Leif Erikson, of Iceland, in the Americas occurred 500 years before Christopher Columbus, and it was unintentional, as it was said that his ship was blown off-course on the way to Greenland. Erikson established settlements in what is now modern day Newfoundland, Canada. In the year 999 AD. Erikson's father, Erik the Red, was one of the first Europeans to establish colonies in Greenland. Iceland was considered the first European country to create colonies in North America and Greenland.

The Norse Greenland colonists referred to the Indigenous Beothuk and Inuit peoples of Newfoundland and Greenland using the derogatory term "skraelings", which meant "wretch" or "scared weakling". The Norse sagas characterize the Indigenous peoples of North America as hostile.

In Danish-ruled Iceland, some Icelandic people participated in Danish colonialism against Black and Asian people. In the 17th century, the Icelander Jón Ólafsson visited Africa and India during his time working for the Danish East Indian Company. The Icelander Árni from Geitarstekk sailed on Danish ships to various locations, including China and Russia.

According to University of Iceland professor Kristín Loftsdóttir, Icelanders have an historical duality as both a colonized people and as colonizers. Loftsdóttir has written that Icelandic settlers participated in settler-colonialism of Indigenous lands in the Americas and that during the push for independence Icelandic nationalists would sometimes "implicitly and explicitly refer to other colonized populations and accept the racist discourse of the time".

=== Finland ===
Finland never held direct colonial possessions, instead Finland has been a part of foreign nations since c. 1150 - 1918, where it was under the control of the Kingdom of Sweden and the Russian Empire.

Finnish people have a colonial history however, due to many Finns having settled in Torne Valley, Finnmark and southern Finnish Lapland, alongside Swedish colonies in North America, many of these Finnish settlers would adapt newer local identities, such as the Tornedalians and the Forest Finns. Many of these migrations were actively promoted by Sweden to increase their control over their colonial possessions, by employing Finns to migrate, most of these Finns were criminals or simply offered an opportunity in the Swedish colonies due to economic or food crisis.

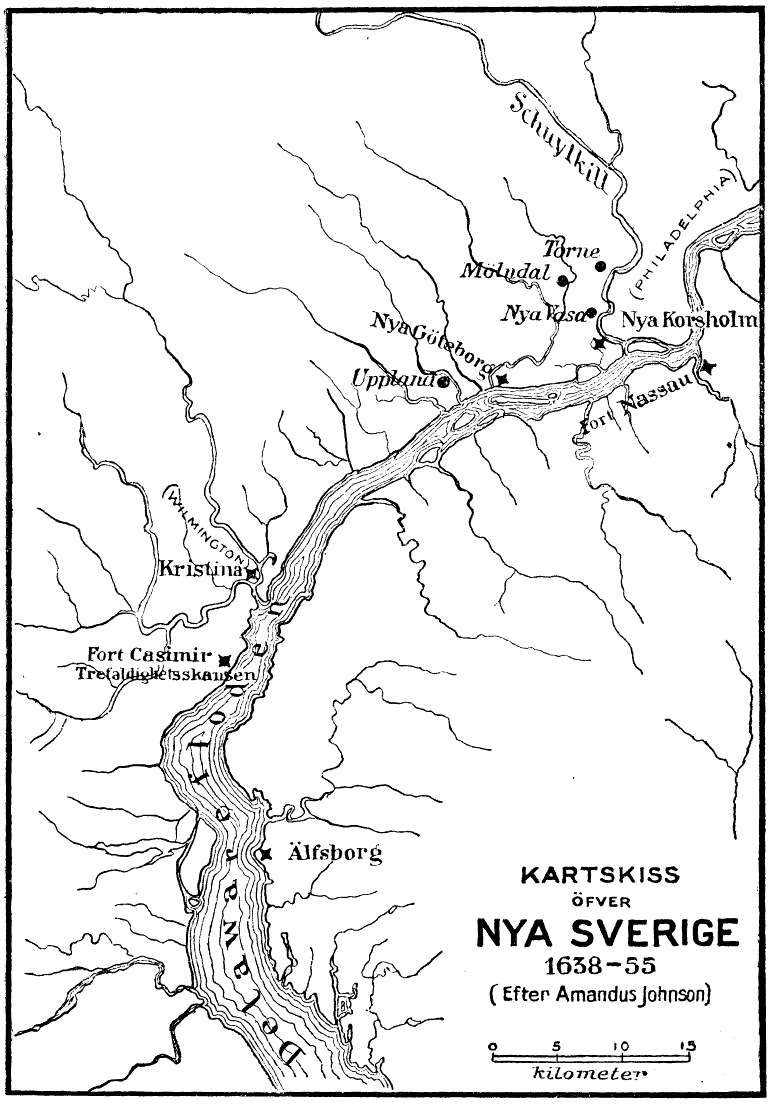
Map of New Sweden c. 1650

In the 14th and 15th centuries, many Finns settled Finnmark and Torne Valley, migrating from Southern Finland to populate the region. This led to the Sámi population becoming outnumbered slowly in the Finnmark and Torne Valley regions, this led to increased competition for vital economic materials such as reindeer fur, which lead to crisis for the mountain Sámi populations. During the Great Northern War, Finnish emigration to Sápmi increased greatly and tensions flared between the Sámi and Finns, leading to many Sámi migrating further northward.

Many Finns lived in New Sweden, a Swedish colony along the Delaware River that existed between 1638 and 1655. The Finns who had migrated to New Sweden were petty criminals, they were offered a reduced sentence for doing hard manual labour in the colony. By 1641, approximately 54 Finnish settlers and their families had arrived to the colony. Although the Finns and Swedes in New Sweden were on better terms with the Indigenous Susquehannock people, in contrast to other colonial powers, there were some defensive attacks against the New Sweden colony by Native Americans. The Finnish population in New Sweden increased over time, until Finns composed approx. 22% of the population, this would increase to over 50% of the population under New Amsterdam.

Finnish settlers, particularly Forest Finns, were culturally important to the early colonization of Appalachia, Idaho, and elsewhere in the United States. Although Finns constituted only a tiny portion of Appalachian settlers, Finnish settlers from New Sweden helped bring northern European woodsman skills such as log cabin construction which formed the basis of backwoods Appalachian material culture.

Beginning in the 1890s, Finnish-born settlers operated in the mining industry in the Katanga Province of Belgian Congo, and in the 1920s, many Finns sought to colonize Ovamboland due to the achievements of the Finnish Evangelical Lutheran Mission, which had converted much of Ovamboland to Lutheranism.

According to the anthology Finnish Colonial Encounters, Finnish people have been able to "claim innocence and non-involvement in European colonialism and colonialist practices" given their own history of being victimized by Swedish and Russian imperialism, a notion the authors refer to as "Finnish exceptionalism". The authors argue that Finnish people were "undeniably involved in the colonial world, with Finns adopting ideologies and identities that cannot easily be disentangled from colonialism". Like some other European countries that never had overseas colonies, such as Switzerland, the anthology defines Finland as an example of "colonial complicity" and "colonialism without colonies".

=== Sámi people ===
Sámi immigrants to North American countries such as Canada and the United States have benefited from settler colonial structures that disadvantage the Indigenous peoples of North America. While close relationships have formed between some Indigenous North Americans and North Americans of Sámi descent, some Sámi activists in North America acknowledge Sámi immigrant complicity in settler colonialism.

=== Norway ===
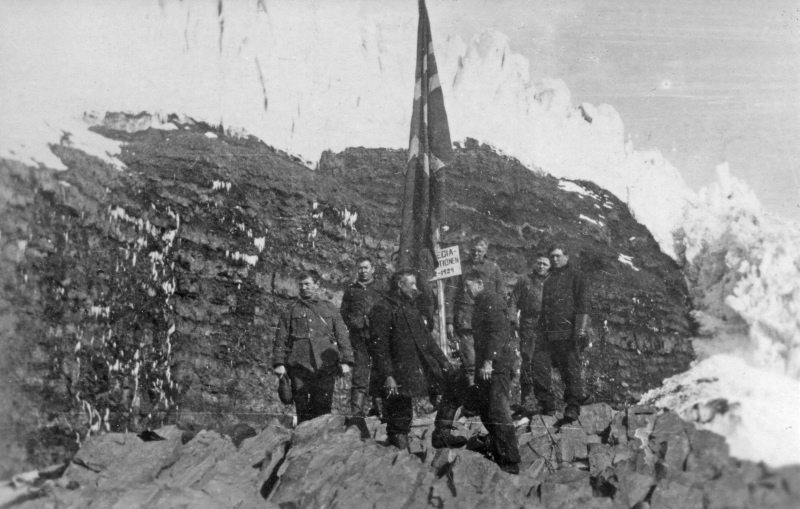
The Norwegian flag was raised by Sandefjord Cove on Peter I Island in 1929.

Norwegians controlled the company Société du Madal in Portuguese Mozambique, which owned coconut plantations and a palm oil factory. Société du Madal used the forced labor of indigenous peoples to dig canals and drain swamps around the Zambezi to make way for plantations, in addition to operating the plantations themselves. Child laborers on Madal's properties were paid in rotgut spirits, as was common for many companies operating in Mozambique during the colonial period. Christian Thams, a key founder and major shareholder of the company, had Mozambicans in lands the company controlled pay taxes directly to the company rather than the Portuguese colonial government, a venture sometimes more profitable than agricultural operations. Even after independence, thousands of workers continued to produce coconut oil for Madal into the 21st century.

As an independent state in modern days, Norway occupied Erik the Red's Land on Greenland from 1931 to 1933. Nils Larsen of Sandefjord's expeditions of Antarctica led to Norway's annexation of Bouvet Island in 1927 and Peter I Island in 1929. Norway also maintains sovereignty of Queen Maud Land on Antarctica. Grytviken, the largest settlement on South Georgia and the South Sandwich Islands, was founded by Sandefjordian Carl Anton Larsen in November 1904. Although never Norwegian territories, many settlements throughout the world were established by Norwegians. Examples include the Norwegian Colony in California, Marburg in South Africa, Joinville in Brazil, and Norsewood in New Zealand.

Additional former territorial claims have included South Georgia Island, Fridtjof Nansen Land (1926–1929), Sverdrup Islands (1928–1930), and Inari, Finland (1942–1945).

=== Sweden ===
Sweden had colonies in the Americas and in Africa. However, they were not able to hold onto them due to revolts and political purchases. Overall, the Swedish impact on the new world was not as influential as that of the British, Spanish, and Portuguese; however they retained political, cultural, and economic influence over many colonies. Swedish colonies in Africa include: Fort Christiansborg/Fort Frederiksborg (1652–1658), Fort Batenstein (1649–1656), Fort Witsen, (1653–1658), and Carolusberg (1650–1663). Swedish countries in the America's include: Guadeloupe (1813–1814), Saint-Barthélemy (1784–1878), New Sweden (1638–1655), and Tobago (1733). The colony of New Sweden can be seen as an example of Swedish colonization. Now called Delaware, New Sweden stood to make a considerable profit due to tobacco growth. There are still people of Swedish descent remaining in former colonies of Sweden.

Swedish colonialism however is not limited to overseas colonies and territories, Sweden has practiced internal colonialism, since its origins. The most affected groups of Swedish colonialism in Europe are the Sámi and the Finns.

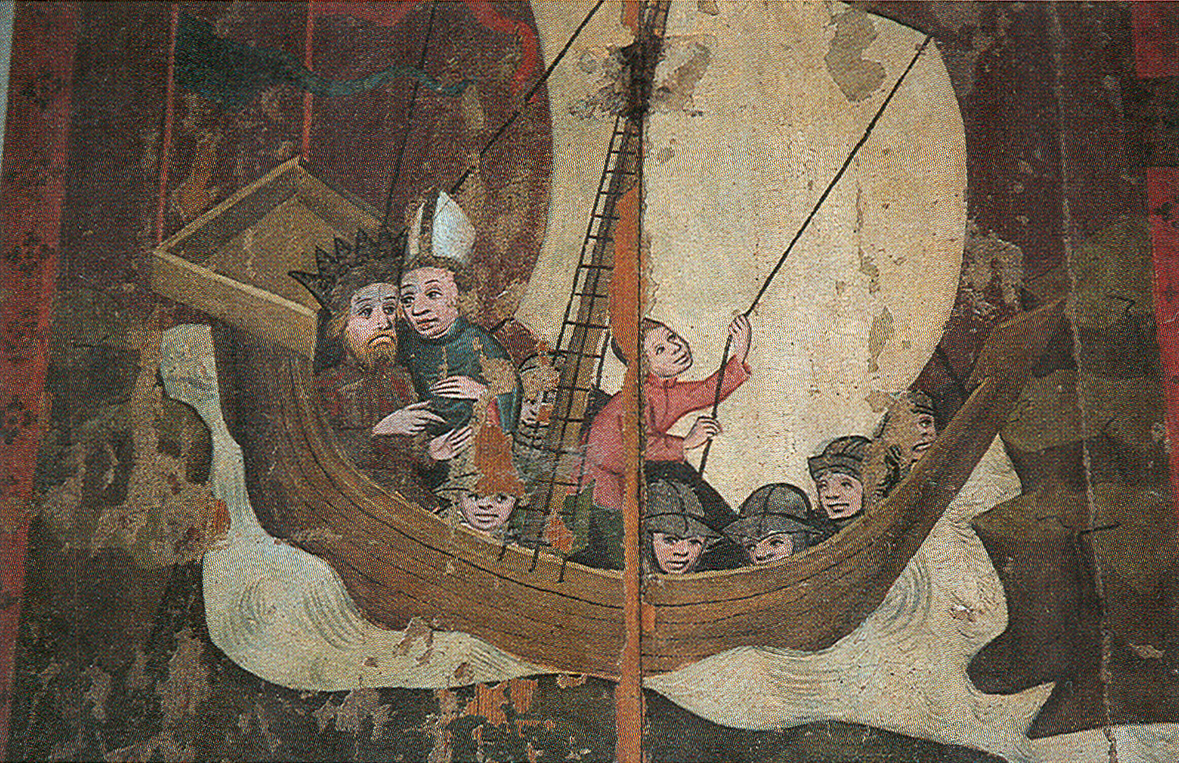
Eric IX of Sweden and bishop Henry en route to Finland. Late medieval depiction from Uppland.

Swedish colonisation of Finland was first actively promoted in the 1150s - 1350s, during the Northern Crusades into Finland, with much of Swedish colonialism in Finland originally being to convert Finland to Christianity, away from their Finnic paganism. Many Swedish settlers moved to Åland, Satakunta and Finland Proper during the First Swedish Crusade. During the time of the Second Swedish Crusade, more Swedes moved to colonize Uusimaa, this would have been in the 13th century, most Swedes in Uusimaa originally settled in Pohja, Ingå or Pernå.

The Swedish colonization of Ostrobothnia is assumed to have begun in the late 13th century during the Second Swedish Crusade, the same time as the colonization of Uusimaa. Swedish colonization of Ostrobothnia was actively promoted by the Swedish Government, as land was given to the settling Swedes and they were promoted to open fishing harbors. The Swedes were successful in their conversion and settlement of Ostrobothnia, as churches were established in Korsholm and Jakobstad.

=== Denmark ===
The Danes colonized many areas including holdings in Africa, the Americas, the Atlantic, and Asia. The medieval Norwegians colonized much of the Atlantic, including Iceland, Greenland, and the Faroe Islands, which were later inherited as colonies by Denmark–Norway. However, both of these nations gradually gained independence and are now fully sovereign within the Danish Empire. In addition, Denmark also colonized parts of "The Americas", including the Danish West Indies, which was purchased by the United States in 1916, and is now a part of the modern-day U.S. Virgin Islands. Denmark also had trading posts along the gold coast of Africa and India, starting in the early 17th century, but these were sold to the United Kingdom in the mid 19th century. There are still Africans, North Americans, Latin Americans, Caribbeans, Atlantic, and Asians of Danish ancestry.

== See also ==
- Anti-Sámi sentiment
- Colonial amnesia
- Danish colonial empire
- Swedish Empire
- Swedish slave trade
- Dano-Norwegian slave trade
