= Daniela Owusu =

Finnish public figure

- Born: 9 February 2004 (age 22); Kirkkonummi, Uusimaa, Finland
- Known for: First black Saint Lucy in Finland

TikTok information
- Page: itsdanivao
- Followers: 39.5K
- Last updated: 28 September 2026

Daniela Owusu (born 9 February 2004) is a Finnish social media content creator, musician and songwriter who portrayed Saint Lucy in Finland's national Saint Lucy's Day celebrations in 2024. She was elected by the public and crowned in a ceremony at Helsinki Cathedral. Owusu, who is of Finnish and Ghanaian descent, was the country's first black woman elected to be Saint Lucy. Her selection as Saint Lucy led to widespread racist backlash.

== Biography ==
Owusu is from Kirkkonummi. Her mother is Finnish and her father is Ghanaian.

=== Saint Lucy's Day ===
In December 2024, Owusu was elected by the public to be Finland's Saint Lucy in the nation's annual Saint Lucy's Day celebrations. She was the first Black woman to serve as Saint Lucy in Finland's history. Owusu said of her election, "It would be important to have a Lucia who represents multiculturalism and to show that Lucia can look many different ways." Owusu was crowned as Saint Lucy in a Lutheran ceremony at the Helsinki Cathedral on 13 December 2024 that was broadcast on national television.

Owusu was subjected to racist abuse and hate comments on social media, including over 10,000 hate comments, leading the organizers of the celebration, Folkhälsan, to report the online harassment to the police and consider taking legal action. Members of her family were also targeted. The director of Folkhälsan, Viveca Hagmark, and the CEO, Anna Hellerstedt, both released statements condemning racism and thanking those who voiced support for Owusu. Finland's prime minister, Petteri Orpo, issued a formal apology to Owusu on behalf of the nation. Orpo met Owusu when she and the Saint Lucy Choir performed at the Finnish Parliament.
