= Islamophobia in Sweden =

Prejudice towards Islam or Muslims in Sweden

Islamophobia in Sweden refers to the set of discourses, behaviours and structures which express feelings of anxiety, fear, hostility and rejection towards Islam and/or Muslims in Sweden. Historically, attitudes towards Muslims in Sweden have been mixed with relations being largely negative in the early 16th century, improving in the 18th century, and declining once again with the rise of Swedish nationalism in the early 20th century. According to Jonas Otterbeck, a Swedish historian of religion, attitudes towards Islam and Muslims today have improved but "the level of prejudice was and is still high." Islamophobia can manifest itself through discrimination in the workforce, prejudiced coverage in the media, and violence against Muslims. The anti-immigration and anti-Islam Sweden Democrats is the third largest party in the Riksdag.

== History ==
In the early 16th century, popular ontological discourse in Sweden regarding Islam was largely negative, portraying the religion as fatalistic, fanatic, violent, cruel, and aggressive. A popular painting from the same century depicts Saint Christopher carrying Jesus as a child on his shoulder, saving him from water in which the Pope and Muhammad drown. The painting was aimed at Catholicism, and portrayed the Pope and Muhammad as false prophets. Turks were often used synonymously with Muslims, as a prayer book of Caspar Melissander from 1609 reads, "Sweet Lord Jesus Christ, keep us from the Turk, the Tattar, the Pope and all sects." Decrees during the 17th century eventually made practicing Islam illegal, as well as any other religion outside of the Church of Sweden. In 1734, membership in the Church of Sweden was established as a precondition for citizenship, and any non-Lutheran could be banned from entry into the country.

During the 18th century, public opinion towards the Muslim world improved with continuous contact to the Ottoman Empire. King Karl XII made exceptions to the aforementioned citizenship laws in 1718, allowing Muslim and Jewish migrants from the Ottoman Empire the right to perform their religion. Opinion towards Islam and Muslims deteriorated once again in the early 20th century with the rise of nationalism and Orientalism in Sweden. Archbishop Nathan Söderblom, teacher and mentor of several of the leading Swedish Orientalist scholars, was highly critical of the faith. Söderblom's attitudes were very impactful to academic discourse, seeing as few Swedish scholars at the time had connection with the Muslim.

After the Second World War, the concept of multiculturalism gained support in among the Swedish public and the Swedish government. By the 1980s, the presence of Islam became visible in the Swedish society for the first time and was met with mixed responses. Jonas Otterbeck, a Swedish historian of religion, claims that most Anti-Muslim sentiment in the country were derived from an opposition to traditional Islamic clothing such as the hijab and a belief that Saudi Wahhabism (an extremely conservative movement within Islam) was representative of the entire religion. At the end of the 1980s, extremist xenophobic groups began targeting Muslims as a severe societal problem and causing the recession in Sweden's economy.

Håkan Hvitfelt conducted surveys in the 1990s to research the Swedish public's attitudes towards Islam. He found that the majority of Swedes had "a rather or very negative attitude to Islam" and considered Islam "incompatible with democracy, oppressive against women, and expansive" in nature. Hvitfelt claimed that media was largely responsible for negative attitudes. Attitudes towards Islam and Muslims in the late 1990s and early 21st century have improved but according to Otterbeck, "the level of prejudice was and is still high."

== In employment ==
A December 2008 study by Jens Agerström and Dan-Olof Rooth of Kalmar University concluded, "With respect to attitudes, whereas 49% of the employers explicitly reported having more negative feelings toward Arab-Muslim than native Swedish males, the IAT showed that no less than 94% evidenced a slight implicit attitude bias." When it came to the topic of productivity, "78% implicitly associated Arab-Muslim males with less productivity, but only 12% explicitly stated that this target group performs less well than native Swedish males." When employers were directly asked whether they prefer native Swedish to Arab-Muslim males when hiring staff, "half of them said they did so." A 2007 study by Moa Bursell of Stockholm University concluded that job applications with names that were perceived to be ethnically Swedish were twice as likely to be called for an interview compared to applications by people of foreign-sounding names, despite identical qualifications. A more recent study from 2012 that used Arabic-sounding names and Swedish-sounding names, and adjusted to make Arabic-sounding applicants more competent and charismatic found that applications with Swedish-sounding names still received more call-backs. Other studies such as a 2013 report by Swedish Muslims in Cooperation Network have referred to the "amount of discrimination against Muslims in the labour market" as "alarming."

== In education ==
A Swedish NGO named EXPO stated in 2015 that both school staff and teaching materials are deficient in avoiding discrimination and stereotypes. Research by Jonas Otterbeck corroborated the conclusion that schoolbooks contained many stereotypes about Islam. A 1993 study by Kjell Härenstam concluded that textbooks often portray Islam as "militaristic." Research by Lena Sawyer and Masoud Kamali in 2006 found that school curriculums frequently pushed a "clash of civilizations" narrative between Swedish society and the Muslim world. A study by Zahra Bayati concluded "racialized segregation in society is reconstructed in education, for example in group work or work placements."

== In the media ==
Research by Ylva Brune in 2006 and Mohammad Fazlhashemi in 2007 concluded that immigrants and Muslims in particular face representations as the ‘other’ and are described with stereotypes often connected to violent behavior. Government agency Equality Ombudsman issued a report in 2015 that found that stereotypes about Muslims are less prevalent in Swedish public service media.

== In the justice system ==
There are no laws in Sweden that directly target Muslims, but critics of the 2003 Anti-Terrorism Act, such as the Swedish Muslims in Cooperation Network, assert the law's definitions of terrorism is too broad, leading many innocent Muslims to be arrested with little to no probable cause. According to a report cited by Sweden's Televisions news programs Aktuellt and Rapport, at least 26 people have been arrested and 15 have been detained between 2003 and 2011. All of those arrested have been Muslims. Author and journalist Jan Guillou called the Anti-Terrorism Act a "race law in practice." The Swedish National Council for Crime Prevention issued a report in 2008 concluding Muslims are less likely to receive an objective treatment in criminal cases and that Informants to the study expressed that there is a tendency to distrust Muslim suspects, especially if they are men. The study found that stereotypes against Muslims are present throughout all instances of the Swedish justice system.

== In politics ==
According to American journalist J. Lester Feder, anti-immigration sentiments in Sweden are often tied in with the idea of counterjihad and a fear that the "nation [will] collapse beneath the weight of Muslim immigration." In 2019, the Swedish Academy gave the Nobel Prize in literature to Peter Handke, a Bosnian Genocide denier. Swedish social services have been accused of kidnapping Muslim children. However, Sweden has denied those accusations calling them "disinformation".

== Hate crimes ==
Some Muslims have been victims of violence because of their religion. In 1993, two young Somali immigrants were stabbed and a local mosque in the city was burned down. The perpetrators of the stabbing were said by police to have been motivated by racial hatred.

The Imam Ali Islamic Centre in Järfälla, the largest Shia mosque in Sweden, was burned down in May 2017 in what police suspect was arson.

=== 2003 and 2005 arson attacks on the Malmö Mosque ===
An arson attack on the Malmö Mosque took place in 2003, which damaged the mosque and totally destroyed other buildings at the Islamic Center. Another attack took place in October 2005.

=== 2014 mosque arson attacks in Sweden ===
A series of arson attacks took place during one week at the end of 2014 on three mosques in Sweden. In addition to being struck by Molotov cocktails, some mosques were vandalized with racist graffiti.

=== 2022 riots in Sweden ===
In April 2022, a Danish far-right party Stram Kurs planned a demonstration, which included the burning of the Islamic holy book, the Qur’an. The party’s anti-Muslim leader, Rasmus Paludan claimed he had burned a copy of the Qur’an before and was willing to repeat the act. However, they were forced to abandon the plans after violent clashes broke out across various cities and towns in Sweden. Protesters threw rocks at the police and set cars on fire at the event. Over 40 people were arrested by the police, while some police officers and protesters were also injured. Saudi Arabia criticized the act, calling it the “deliberate abuse of the holy Quran by some extremists in Sweden, and provocation and incitement against Muslims".

== Organizations ==
Tryckfrihetssällskapet (Society for Freedom of the Press) is an anti-Muslim lobbying group that gained notoriety in 2012, when one of its leading members assaulted two Muslim women outside a hospital in Malmö while yelling anti-Muslim expletives.

== Opposition ==
Following arson attacks on mosques in late 2014, many Swedes hung cut-out paper hearts on the firebombed mosques to show solidarity with Swedish Muslims.

== See also ==
- Racism in Sweden
- Islam in Sweden
- Antisemitism in Sweden
- Scania Party

== Sources ==
- Otterbeck, Jonas (Spring 2002). "The Depiction of Islam in Sweden: An Historical Overview" (PDF). Muslim World. 92 (1/2): 143–156. doi:10.1111/j.1478-1913.2002.tb03737.x.
