= Finnish nationalism =

Nationalistic ideology about the culture and ethnicity of Finnish people

The Flag of Finland, a sea-blue Nordic cross on white field

Finnish nationalism was a central force in the history of Finland starting in the 19th century. The Finnish national awakening in the mid-19th century was the result of members of the Swedish-speaking upper classes deliberately choosing to promote Finnish culture and language as a means of nation building - i.e. to establish a feeling of unity between all people in Finland including (and not of least importance) between the ruling elite and the ruled peasantry. The publication in 1835 of the Finnish national epic, the Kalevala, a collection of traditional myths and legends which is the folklore common to the Finns and to the Karelian people, stirred the nationalism that later led to Finland's independence from Imperial Russia.

Nationalism was contested by the pro-Russian element and by the internationalism of the labor movement. The result was a tendency toward class conflict over nationalism, but in the early 1900s the working classes split into the Valpas (class struggle emphasis) and Mäkelin (nationalist emphasis).

== Language ==
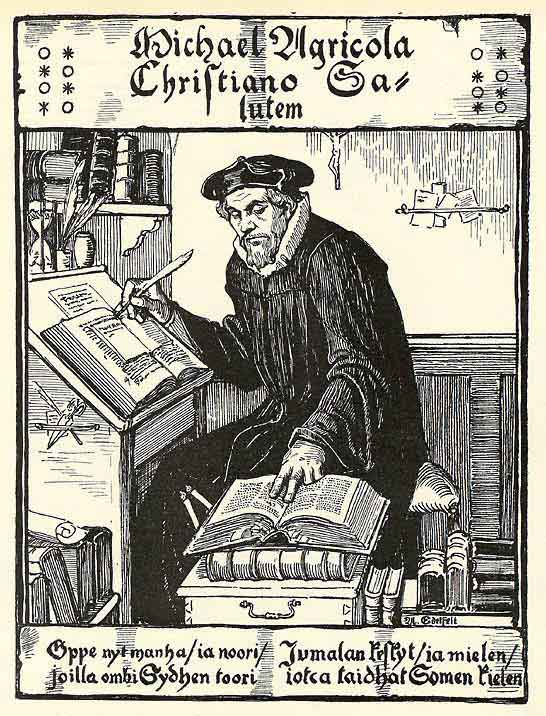
Mikael Agricola by Albert Edelfelt.

Mikael Agricola (c. 1510 – 1557) was a Finnish Lutheran clergyman known as the father of literary Finnish. He played a key role in the Protestant Reformation in Finland and Sweden and was the first Lutheran bishop of Turku. Agricola is most celebrated for creating the written form of the Finnish language by translating religious texts, including the New Testament into Finnish in 1548, and producing some of the first books in Finnish - such as an Alphabet book and a catechism. His work laid the foundation for modern Finnish orthography and literature.

Particularly following Finland's incorporation into the Swedish central administration during the 16th and 17th centuries, Swedish was spoken by about 15% of the population, especially the upper and middle classes. Swedish was the language of administration, public institutions, education and cultural life - only the peasants spoke Finnish. The emergence of Finnish to predominance resulted from a 19th-century surge of Finnish nationalism, aided by Russian bureaucrats attempting to separate Finns from Sweden and to ensure the Finns' loyalty.

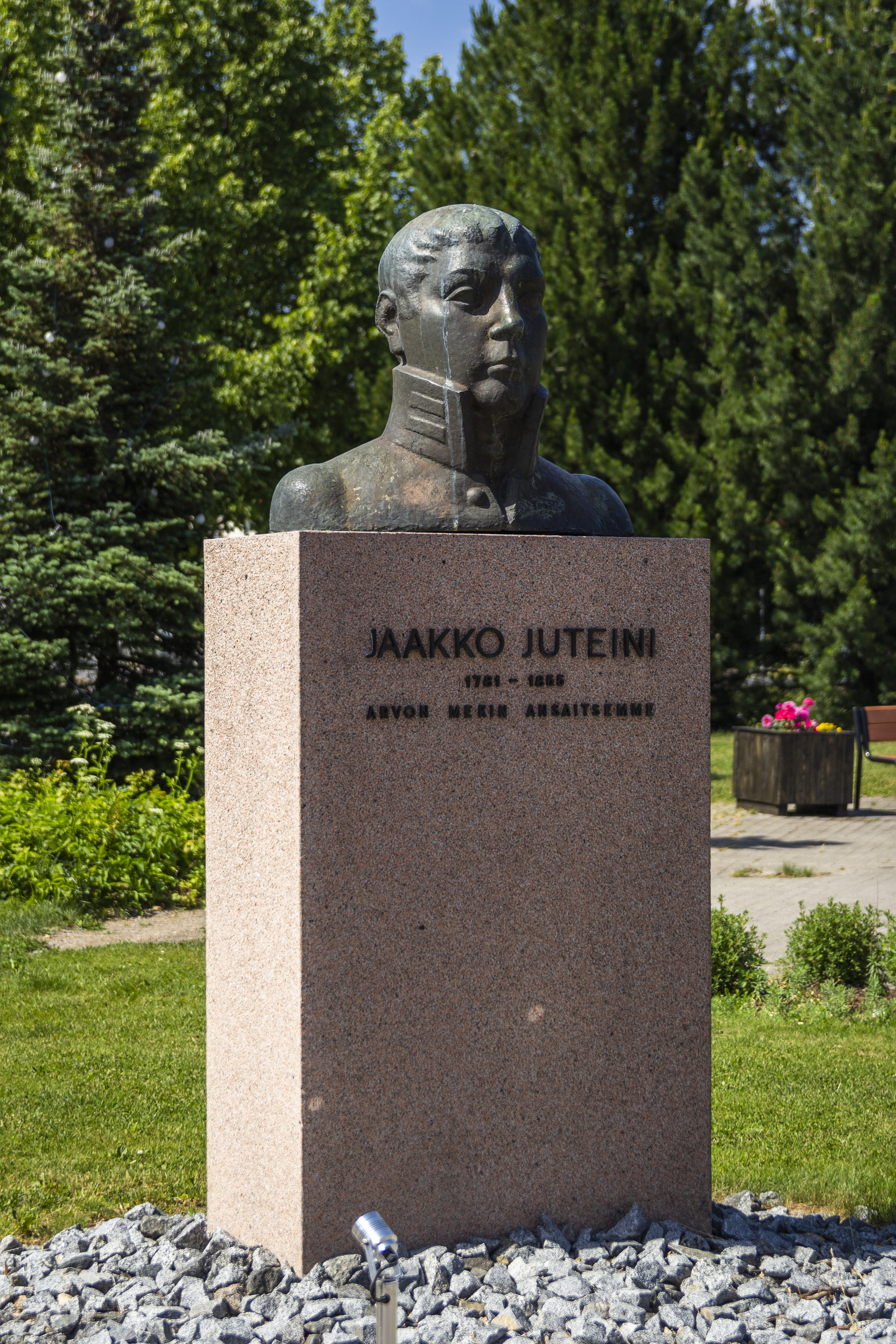
Author Jaakko Juteini's statue in Hattula.

Jaakko Juteini (Jacob Judén, 1781–1855), from Hattula, was the first Finnish-language author to publish an extensive and diverse body of work, and he was also one of the founders of the Finnish Literature Society of Viipuri. Juteini sought to address social injustices and to raise the level of knowledge and education among Finnish-speaking common people. He was both a humorist and an ethical thinker, who advocated for love of one's neighbor and promoted the protection of animals.

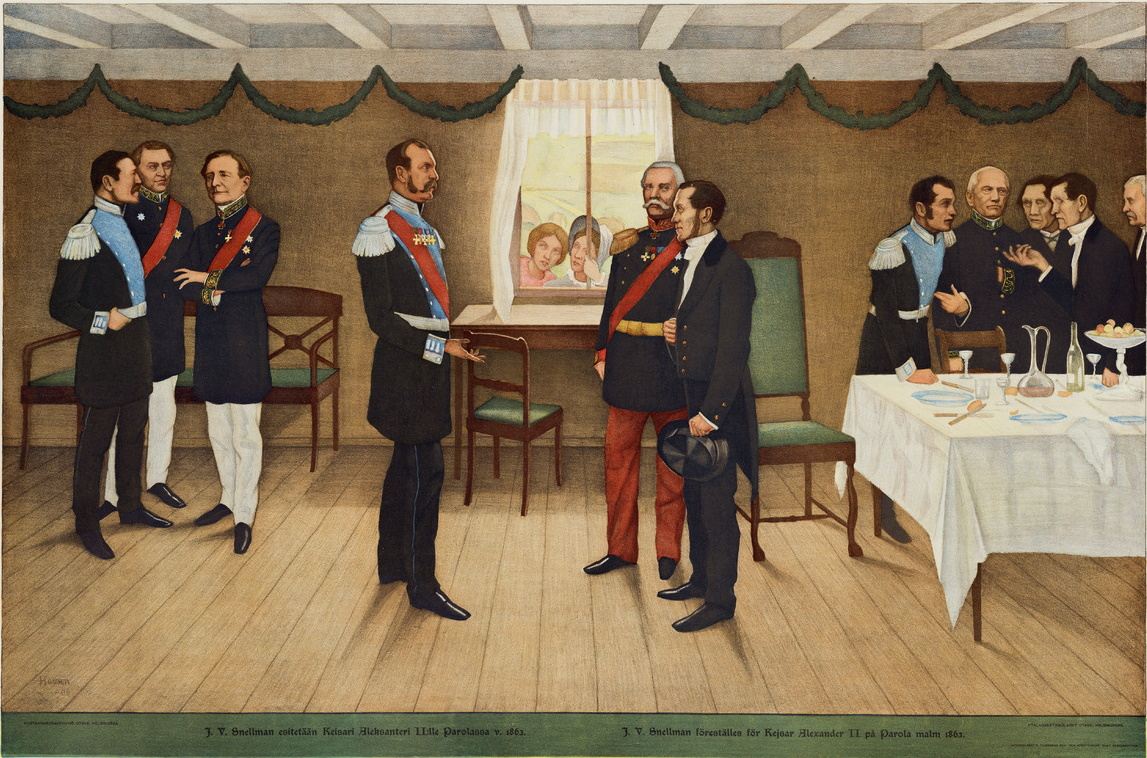
Senator Johan Vilhelm Snellman met Emperor Alexander II at Parolannummi in Hattula.

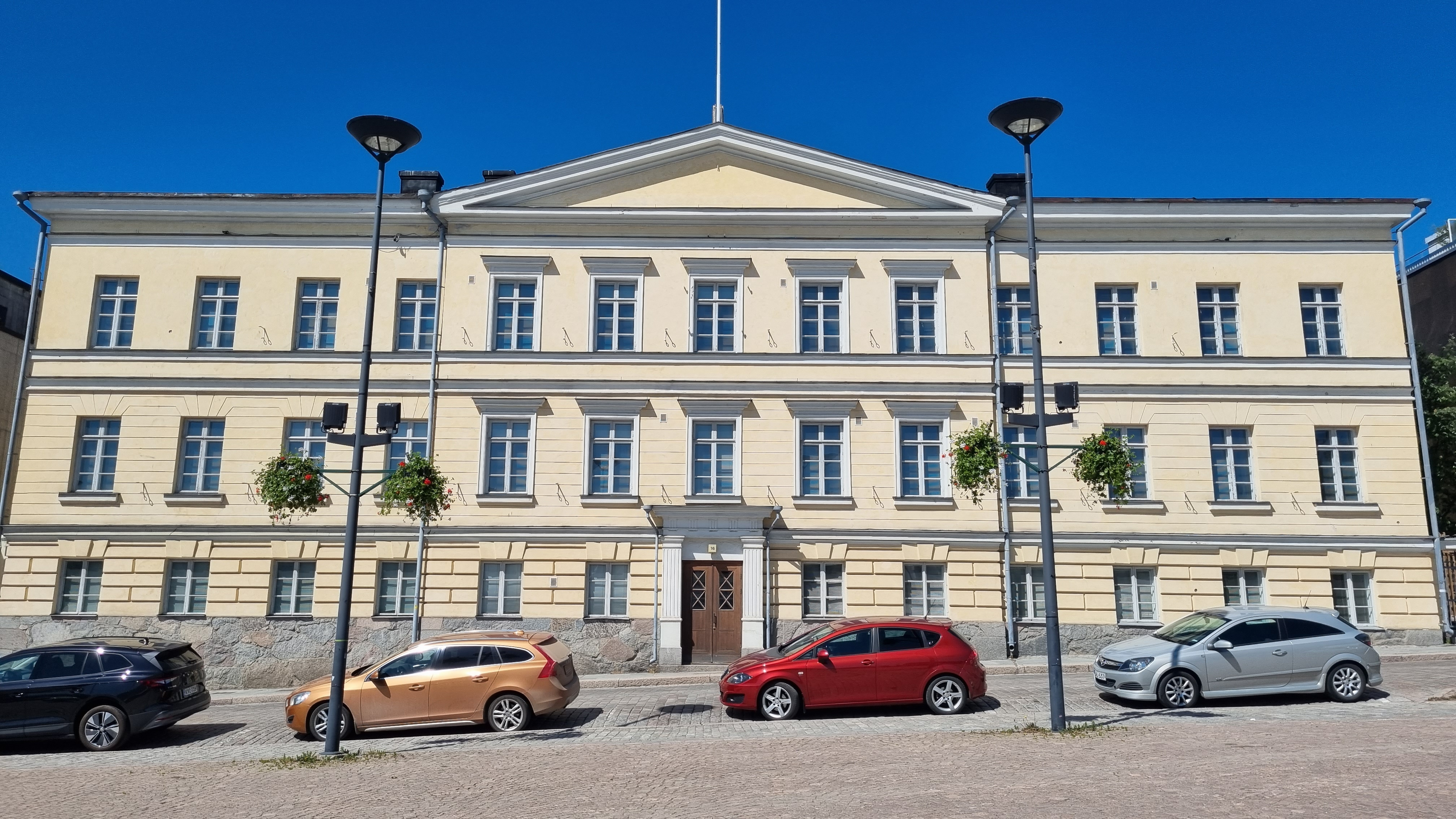
Emperor Alexander II signed the decree at the Governor's Palace in Hämeenlinna.

One of the most significant events was when the Emperor of Russia, Grand Duke of Finland, Alexander II, traveled to the Grand Duchy of Finland in 1863. That same year, the Diet of the Estates was held in Helsinki, for the first time since 1809. Alexander II traveled to Parolannummi in Hattula, where he was received with a military parade and ceremonial festivities. It was a carefully organised event, and the people were present in great numbers. Senator Johan Vilhelm Snellman presented Alexander II with a decree that placed the Finnish language on an equal footing with the Swedish language. Alexander signed the decree at the Governor's Palace in Hämeenlinna. In honor of Alexander's visit, the Lion of Parola statue was erected, which is located in Hattula.

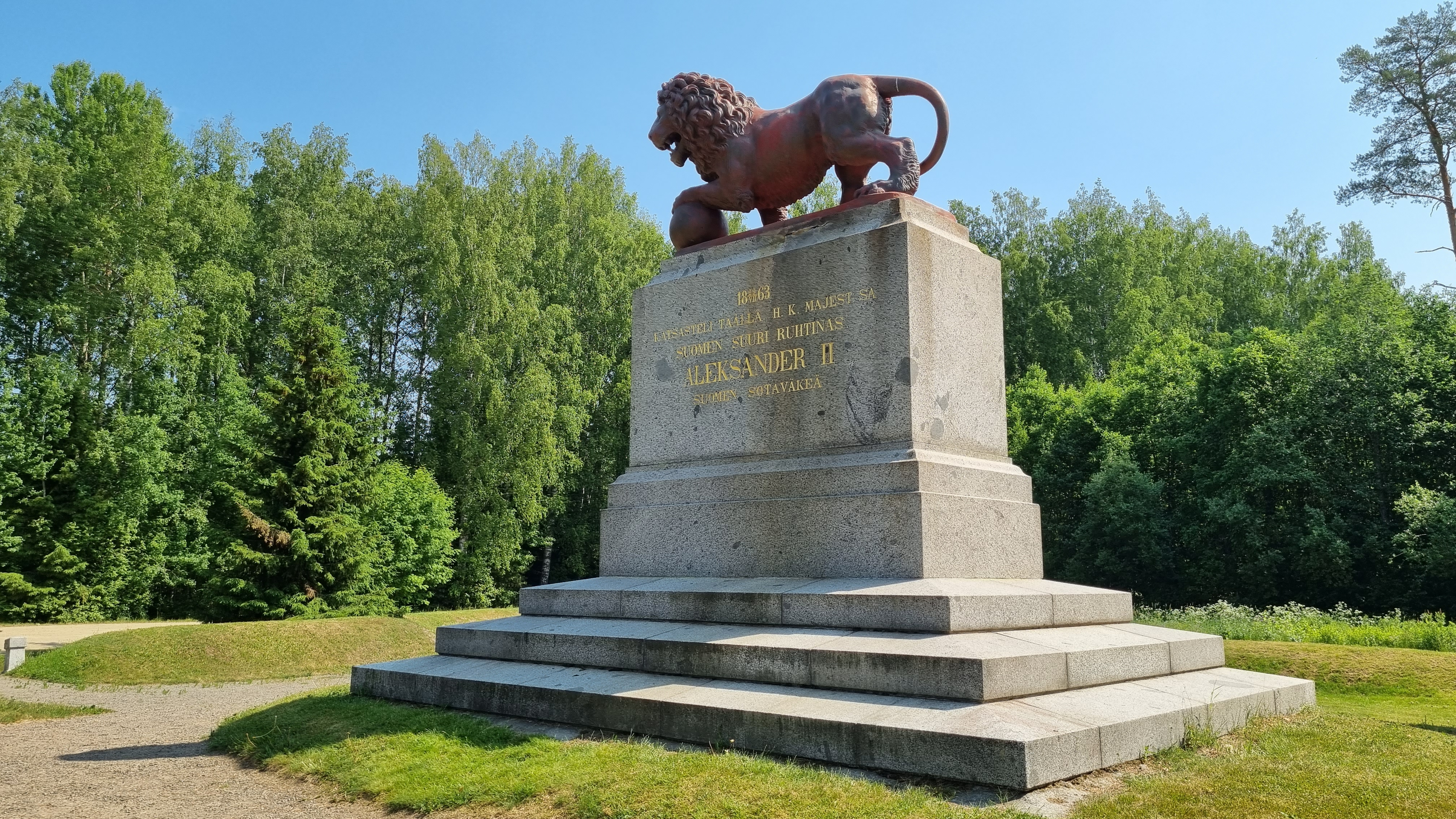
The Lion of Parola in Hattula.

In 1863, the Finnish language gained an official position in administration. The language issue overlapped both liberalism and nationalism, and showed some a class conflict as well, with the peasants pitted against the conservative Swedish-speaking landowners and nobles. Complicating this, the Finnish activists divided into "old" (no compromise on the language question and conservative nationalism) and "young" (liberation from Russia) Finns. The leading liberals were Swedish-speaking intellectuals who called for more democracy; they became the radical leaders after 1880. The liberals organised for social democracy, labor unions, farm cooperatives, and women's rights.

In 1892, Finnish finally became an equal official language and gained a status comparable to that of Swedish. Nevertheless, the Swedish language continued to be the language of culture, arts and business into the 1920s. Legislation since 1922 gives Finnish and Swedish equal official status. By 2000, Swedish was the first language of about 6% of the population, or 300,000 people. However, since the late 20th century there has been a steady migration of older, better-educated Swedish speakers to Sweden.

Affluent Finnish-Swedish families have moved from Finland to Sweden because there is no inheritance tax in Sweden. Sweden particularly attracts owners of family businesses.

Finnish speakers have displaced Swedish speakers from among the wealthiest people in Finland. In 2025, there were seven Finns on Forbes' list of the world's richest people, and all of them are Finnish-speaking.

In 2024, approximately 4.74 million people (84.5%) spoke the Finnish language as their first language in Finland. In 2024, about 285,400 people spoke Swedish and around 1,900 spoke Sámi as their first language in Finland. Swedish speakers made up about 5.1% and Sámi speakers about 0.03% of the total population.

The majority of people who speak Finnish in Finland are still of ethnic Finnish origin, but an increasing number come from more multicultural backgrounds as immigration grows and as children of immigrants adopt Finnish as their primary language.

== Social movements ==
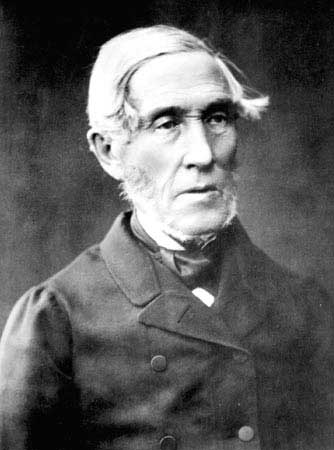
Senator Johan Vilhelm Snellman (1806–1881), who also possessed the professions of philosopher, journalist and author, was one of the most influential Fennomans and perhaps one of the most internationally known Finnish statesmen.

Movements toward Finnish national pride, as well as liberalism in politics and economics involved ethnic and class dimensions. The nationalist movement against Russia began with the Fennoman movement led by Hegelian philosopher Johan Vilhelm Snellman in the 1830s. Snellman sought to apply philosophy to social action and moved the basis of Finnish nationalism to establishment of the language in the schools, while remaining loyal to the czar. Fennomania became the Finnish Party in the 1860s.

Liberalism was the central issue of the 1860s to 1880s.

The first half of the 20th century saw significant "language strife" - debates, protests, and campaigns in universities, public offices, and cultural life to expand the use of Finnish and reduce Swedish dominance.

== Educating the Finns in national identity ==
=== Institutions ===
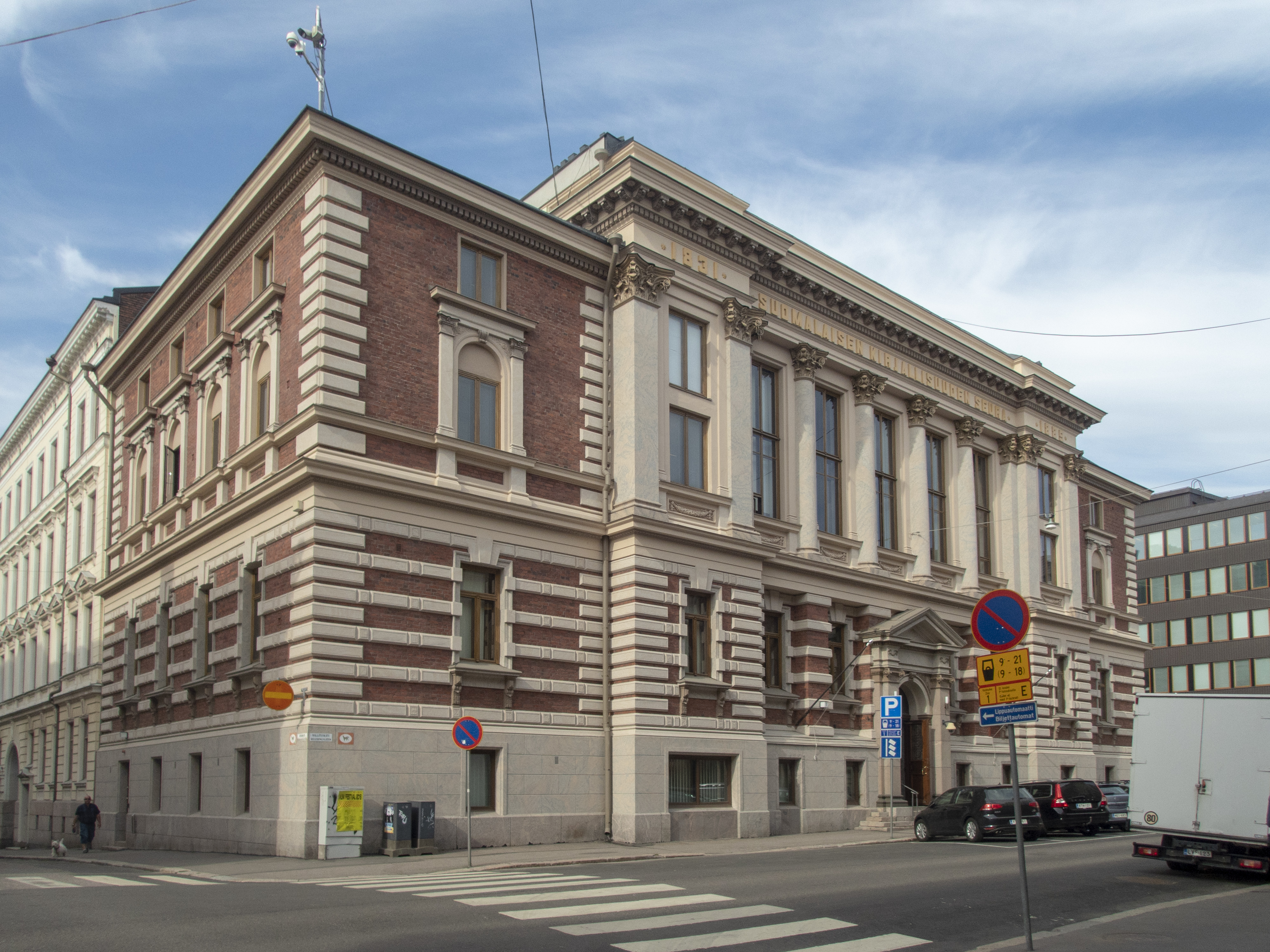
The Finnish Literature Society at Hallituskatu in Helsinki.

The Finnish Literature Society was founded in 1831 to promote Finnish literature.

=== Schools and universities ===
Under Russian rule there was a strong grass-roots informal people's enlightenment, based on the Society for the Advancement of Popular Education, run by Swedish elites. It promoted folk high schools teaching in Finnish and youth movements with lessons centered around patriotic and nationalist themes. The Swedish elites after 1850 also promoted public festivals with patriotic themes, hoping to both instill nationalism and draw the Finnish-speaking peasants and workers away from socialist movements that downplayed nationalism. Team sports and rowing competitions became favorite attractions, and all the festivals began with speeches.

When independence came, the schools were redesigned to instill Finnish nationalism. Jokela and Linkola (2013) examined the photographs in Finnish geography textbooks and tourist guides in the 1920s and conclude they were an integral part of the everyday teaching of nationalism. Finnish writers, intellectuals and academics saw themselves as part of the authoritative system or "state idea" that represented the entire national territory.

Finnish language societies and academic bodies throughout the 20th century developed standards for "proper" Finnish, advocated purism, and established Finnish-medium instruction in schools and universities.

=== Arts ===
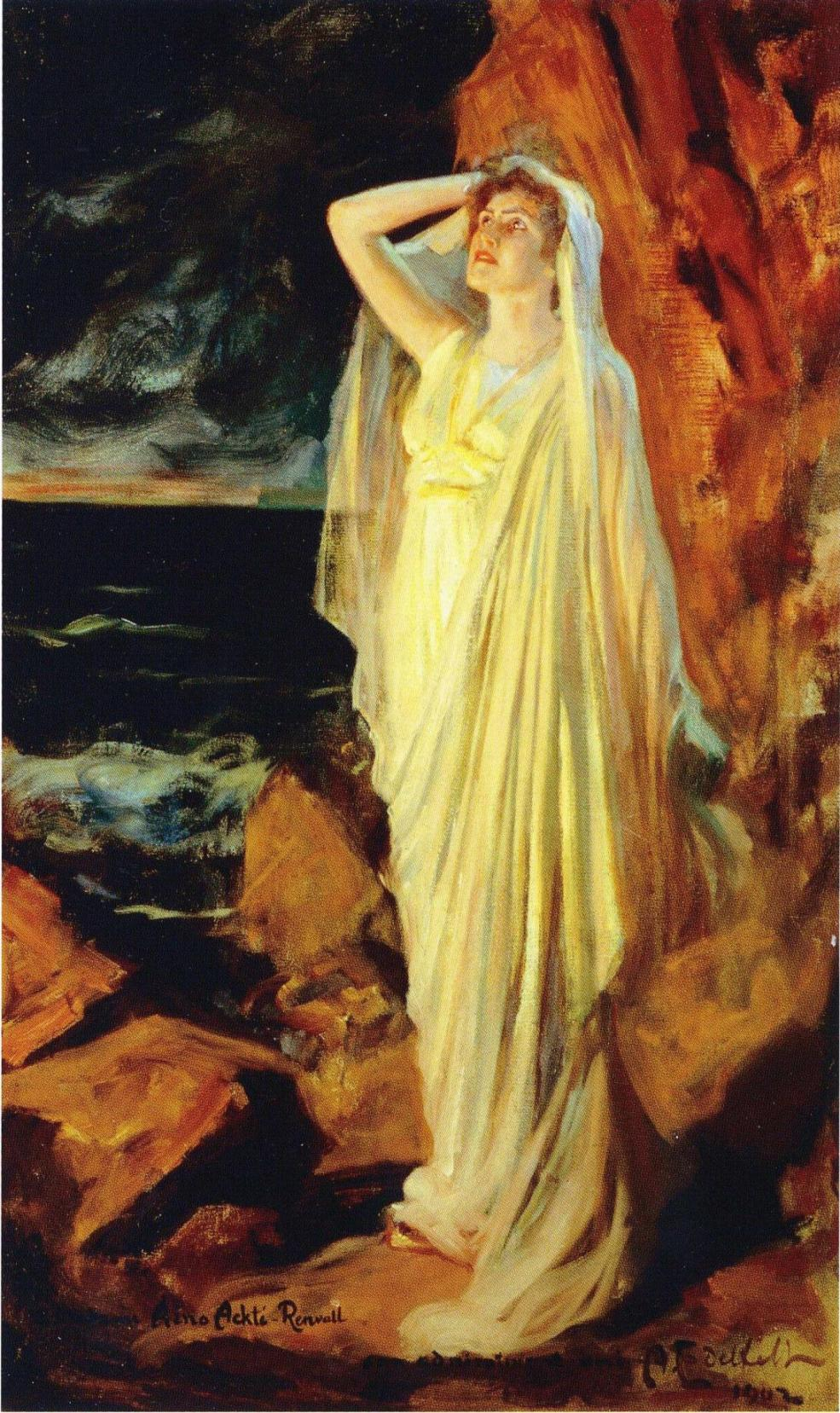
Opera singer Aino Ackté by Albert Edelfelt.

In the days of Russian rule, music and opera became vehicles for the expression of nationalism. Jean Sibelius (1865–1957) especially used traditional Finnish folk tunes as the basis of nationalistic compositions. Nationalist painters were for example Akseli Gallen-Kallela, Albert Edelfelt, and Edvard Isto.

Independent Finland used its postage stamps to help construct national narrative, a collective memory, and its self-image. Everyone used stamps routinely so it was an inexpensive way to reach the entire population with a popular heroic version of the national story. The stamps provided a simplified visual history of the evolution of the Finnish state, nation and society.

=== Clubs ===
The members of the Helsingin Suomalainen Klubi participated in the founding of the Finnish National Theatre, the Otava publishing company, the Uusi Suomi newspaper, the Pohjola insurance company, and the Kansallis-Osake-Pankki bank.

== Architecture ==
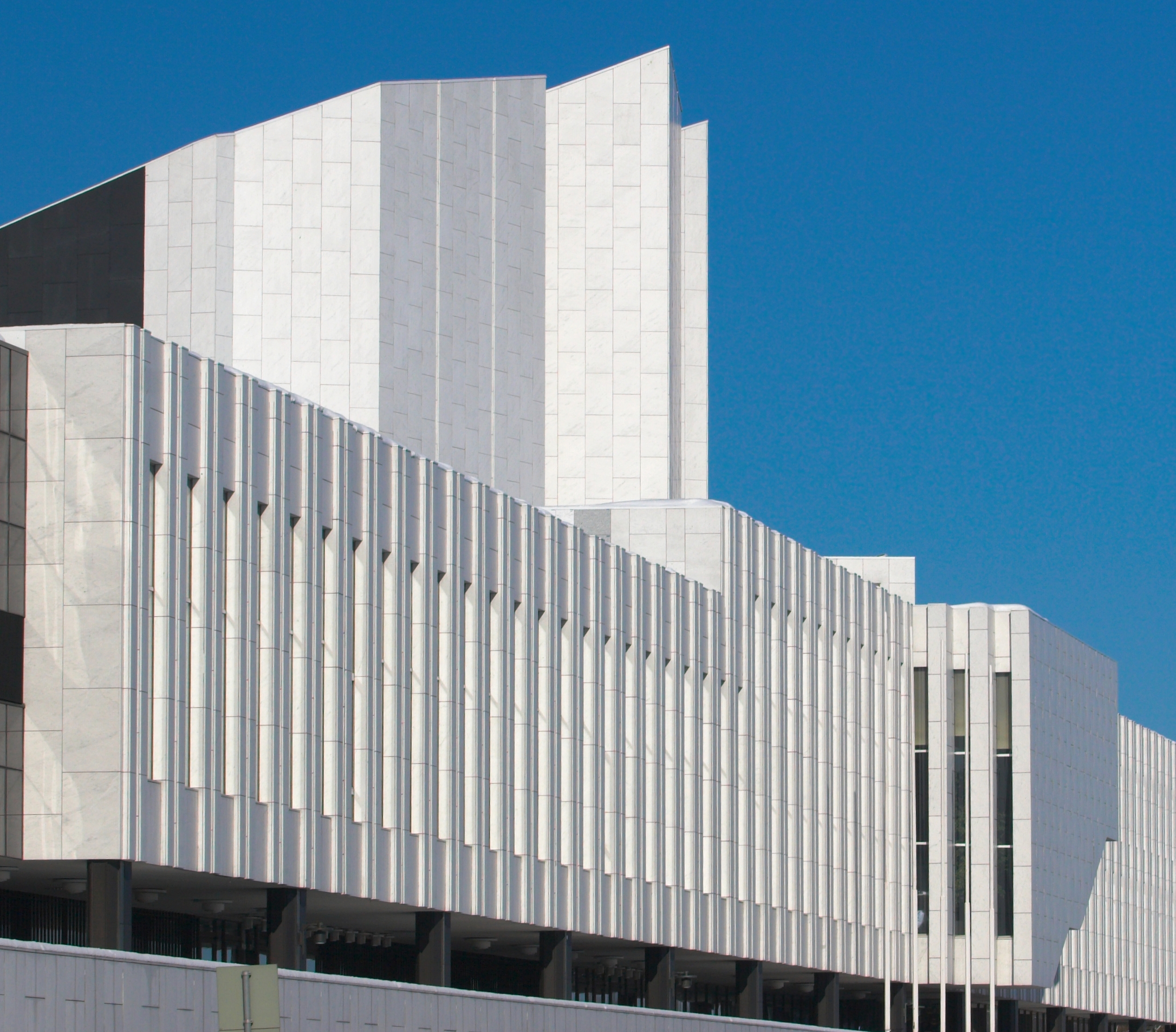
Finlandia Hall by Alvar Aalto.

At the turn of the 20th century, Finland embraced the National Romantic style, which drew inspiration from Finnish building heritage and the national epic Kalevala, often expressed through wooden architecture and Art Nouveau influences. Architects like Eliel Saarinen and Lars Sonck were key figures during this period, with Saarinen's Helsinki Railway Station (1919) being a landmark example.

After Finnish independence in 1917, architecture moved toward Nordic Classicism and later into Functionalism, with architects like Alvar Aalto leading this transformation. Aalto's most notable work of art is the Finlandia Hall, a concert venue. Nordic Classicism incorporated simple geometric forms and restrained decoration, as exemplified by the Finnish Parliament House (1931). This period also emphasized social ideals reflected in residential architecture and garden suburbs.

== See also ==
- Finnish Literature Society
- Finnish National Theatre
- Finnish National Opera and Ballet
- Ateneum
- National Museum of Finland
- Racism in Finland
