= Racism in Finland =

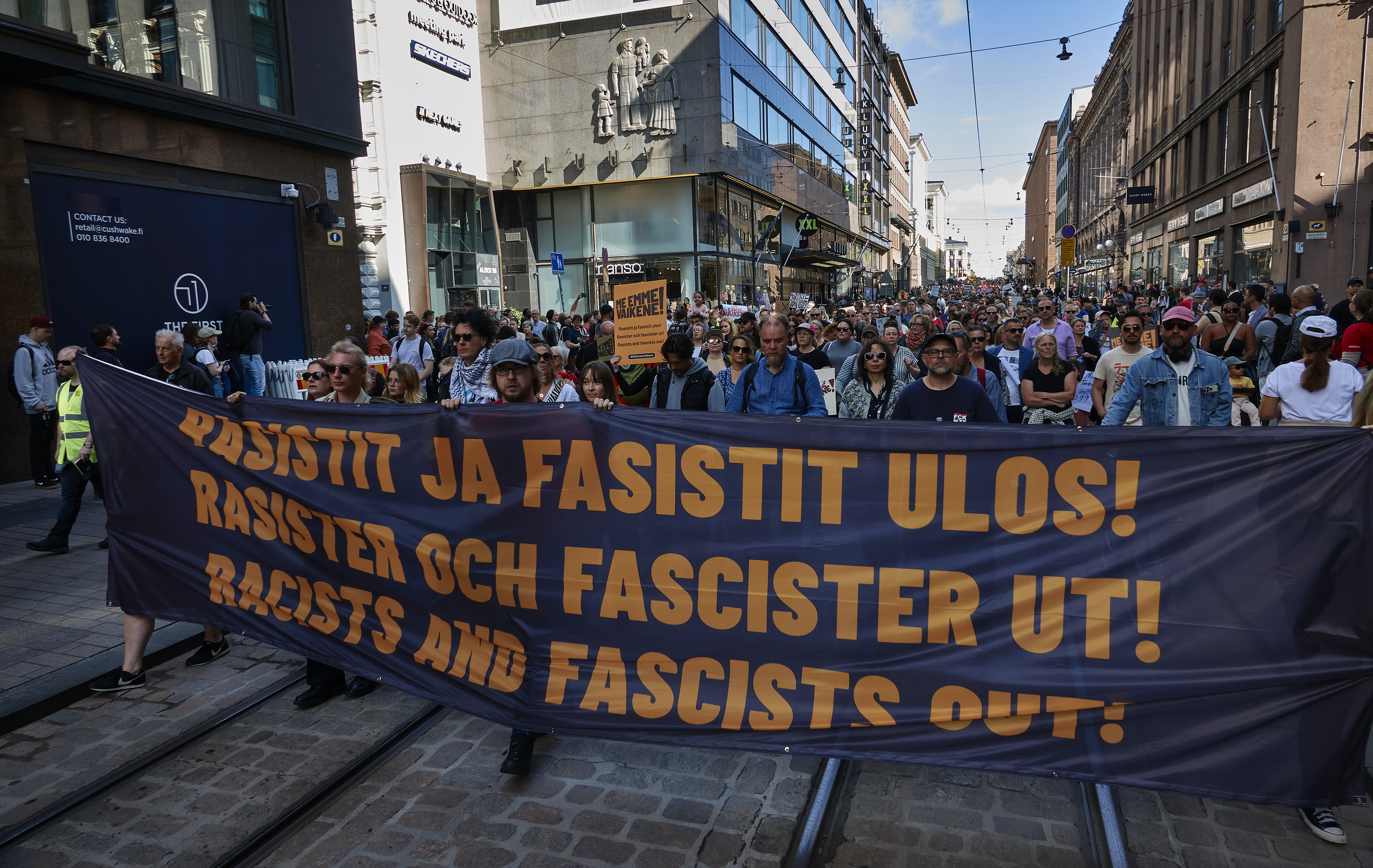
People marching at the "Me emme vaikene" ("End the silence") demonstration against racism and fascism in the centre of Helsinki, Finland in September 2023.

A 2011 poll showed that 66% of Finnish respondents considered Finland to be a racist country but only 14% admitted to being racist themselves. In 2018, Being Black in the EU report found Finland to be among the most racist countries in Europe. Minority groups facing the most negative attitudes are Finnish Kale, Somalis, and ethnic groups mostly consisting of Muslims.

In December 2012, the Finnish Police reported an increase in cases of racism and related physical abuse. In February 2013, researchers of racism and multiculturalism reported an increase in the number of threats and abuse. In January 2013, Save the Children reported that immigrant children were facing an increasing amount of racist abuse. In June 2011, a researcher reported an increase in the amount of racist violence targeting children and teenagers.

According to the European Commission against Racism and Intolerance (ECRI) of the Council of Europe, neither Finland's Non-Discrimination Ombudsman nor its advisory board for Non-Discrimination have the financial and human resources to effectively perform according to their mandates. There is a National Discrimination Tribunal, but it cannot order compensation for victims of racial discrimination. The legal provisions of Finland's Aliens' Act are discriminatory and subject ethnic minorities to racial profiling by the police.

According to ECRI, the majority of people in Finland don't know enough about the Sámi people (an Indigenous ethnic minority in Finland) and are not taught enough about Sámi people and culture in school. ECRI has criticized Finland for not having ratified the ILO-convention 169 on Indigenous and Tribal Peoples.

== Public perception of racism ==
According to a 2024 survey by the Finnish Business and Policy Forum (EVA), most Finns consider racism unacceptable, but there is significant disagreement on the severity of the problem in Finnish society. Approximately 40% of the population regards racism as a major problem, whereas 55% of the population considers it as a minor issue. These figures have remained relatively stable since the first survey in 1990.

The views are strongly polarized by political affiliation. A large majority of voters for the left-wing parties view racism as a major problem. In contrast, only 5% of Finns Party supporters and 23% of National Coalition Party supporters share this view. Similarly, public opinion is split on whether Finland is a racist country: 51% estimate the country is at least somewhat racist, while 49% do not view it as particularly racist. Only 17% consider Finland fully or almost free of racism. Leftist parties generally have a more negative view than average.

According to the survey, Finns share a narrow definition of what constitutes racism. There is a strong consensus that ethnic discrimination and derogatory language about ethnic groups is racist, although the supporters of the Finns Party are not fully convinced that using language critical of immigrant groups is racist. Overall, a majority of Finns feel that freedom of speech is under threat, as critical or controversial opinions are increasingly labeled as hate speech, while about a third do not see restrictions on harsh speech as a threat to free expression. Ethnic humour is viewed as racist by only by one fifth of the population, with 59% seeing no issue. Microaggressions are not widely perceived as racist.

Finns generally have high trust in authorities, which influences perceptions of institutional racism. Only 35% of respondents recognize ethnic profiling by police or other authorities as racist.

== History ==
Historically, Finns were involved in colonial projects as subjects of the Kingdom of Sweden and the Russian Empire. Scholars describe this involvement as "colonial complicity," noting that while Finns were not an imperial power, they benefited from the global colonial order. Finns were among the settlers in the New Sweden colony in North America, and were involved with the slave trade at the Swedish colony of Saint Barthélemy. In Africa, Finnish colonial involvement included missionary work in Ovamboland (today part of Namibia) starting from 1870. Additionally, from the late 17th century, the Swedish state pursued internal colonization by encouraging Finnish settlement on indigenous Sámi lands in the north. The first Governor of St. Barthélemy, Major Salomon von Rajalin, was a Swede of Finnish origin who promoted the development of St. Barthélemy as a hub of the Atlantic slave trade. The historian Seppo Sivonen and the documentary filmmaker Jouko Aaltonen have asserted that Finland, as the eastern province of Sweden, benefited from the global slave trade both through the profit of individual Finnish investors and from profits flowing into the Swedish State Treasury.

During the 18th and 19th centuries, European scientists created racial taxonomies that viewed the "Nordic race", which included Swedes, Norwegians, and Danes, as superior to the "Mongoloid race", which included the Sámi, Finns, Tatars, and the Roma. In Finland, scholars criticized these classifications. They either contested the whole theory or tried to distance the Finns from the other groups, especially the nomadic Sámi. Following independence, researchers sought to anchor Finns among the European nations by establishing distinctions between themselves and the Sámi and Russian populations. This effort included a physical anthropology program led by Professor Yrjö Kajava between 1926 and 1934, which measured the skulls of 37 percent of the Finnish Sámi. Research methods also included stripping subjects naked for photography and digging up skeletons from graves to study their skulls.

== Notable cases ==
=== Helsinki Regional Transport Authority case ===
According to a report from Iltalehti, an alleged incident of racism and police brutality occurred on the evening of 4 July 2020 at the Central Railway Station of Helsinki Metro. The incident centers on two youths, one white male and one black male, who were apprehended together for not having a valid ticket. According to eyewitness accounts and unverified footage of the incident that was circulating on social media, the white youth was calmly spoken to by the police before being allowed to leave, however, the black teenager was allegedly thrown down onto the floor by security staff and placed in handcuffs. One security staff member was allegedly seen pressing his knee down on the teenager's neck, at which point the victim could be seen yelling out "I can't breathe" in English, which has clearly evoked images on social media in the case of George Floyd in the United States. According to security staff and HSL department chief Janne Solala, the white youth was cooperative, provided his ID when asked and didn't try to resist so force wasn't needed. Meanwhile, after getting caught, the black teenager refused to provide his ID or any other information about himself and tried to flee from the scene. Finnish ticket inspectors have a right written in law to prevent a suspect from leaving if caught travelling without a valid ticket, and by the same law a person travelling without a ticket is required to provide their ID to the ticket inspector. According to Solala, this situation had nothing to do with racism, race or gender because security staff will use similar force on anyone who is resisting and uncooperative, ethnic Finns included. Also, written statements and security camera footages indicated that excessive force was not used in this situation by the security staff.

=== Orpo cabinet ===
Since its formation in June 2023, the Orpo Cabinet has faced repeated turmoil due to racism scandals involving ministers from the right-wing populist Finns Party.

On June 28, 2023, Vilhelm Junnila, the Minister of Economic Affairs survived a vote of no confidence (95–86) initiated by opposition parties over his connections to far-right extremism. The vote caused internal division, with coalition partner Swedish People's Party voting against him. Following further controversy regarding a past motion where Junnila suggested promoting "climate abortions" in Africa to curb population growth, he resigned on June 30, 2023, and was succeeded by Wille Rydman. Rydman himself became the subject of controversy in July, after private messages were published in which he repeatedly used racist language.

In June 2023, media outlets reported that several key ministers, including Riikka Purra, Mari Rantanen, Leena Meri, and Ville Tavio, had repeatedly used rhetoric associated with the Great Replacement conspiracy theory. Interior Minister Rantanen had utilized the hashtag #väestönvaihto ("great replacement") and described immigration as a threat to the "blue-eyed" (a Finnish term for "naive") population. While the Finnish Security Intelligence Service identifies the theory as a motivator for far-right terrorism, the ministers denied supporting conspiracy theories, stating they relied on statistics. Prime Minister Petteri Orpo maintained confidence in the ministers, calling for contextual understanding.

In July 2023, online comments of Riikka Purra, the Minister of Finance of the Orpo Cabinet and the leader of the Finns Party, written in 2008 prior to her political career to Jussi Halla-aho's Scripta blog emerged in the media. Using the username riikka, she frequently used racial slurs against immigrants, and described fantasies of violence against them. Following a statement by President Sauli Niinistö for a zero-tolerance stance on racism, Purra apologized for the comments. Subsequent controversy arose regarding 2019 writings where she referred to women in burqa as "unrecognizable black sacks". Prime Minister Petteri Orpo called an excerpt from the writings unacceptable, but considered that Purra's earlier apology was enough. Orpo later clarified that he considers the writings to advocate for women's rights. While opposition parties demanded an emergency parliamentary session, Speaker Jussi Halla-aho rejected the request. Public polling at the time showed 47% of Finns believed Purra should resign, while 40% thought that she shouldn't.

In response to the racism scandals, the government issued an anti-racism announcement in August 2023, outlining 23 measures to promote equality and combat discrimination. The measures included an anti-racism campaign, which was published in August 2024, though the Finns Party declined to join. In September 2024, the government published an action programme to combat racism and promote equality. In June 2025, ministers attended mandatory anti-racism training. Finns Party ministers expressed skepticism or dismissiveness toward the training, and the party's vice chair, Teemu Keskisarja, dismissed both the campaign and the training, framing them as part of a "culture war".

=== Saint Lucy case ===
In December 2024, Daniela Owusu, a Finnish woman of Ghanaian descent, was elected to serve as Saint Lucy during Finland's national Saint Lucy's Day celebrations, which led to racist backlash. Owusu was subjected to racist abuse and hate comments on social media, including over 10,000 hate comments, leading the organizers of the celebration, Folkhälsan, to report the online harassment to the police and consider taking legal action. Members of her family were also targeted.

The director of Folkhälsan, Viveca Hagmark, and the CEO, Anna Hellerstedt, both released statements condemning racism and thanking those who voiced support for Owusu. Finland's prime minister, Petteri Orpo, issued a formal apology to Owusu on behalf of the nation. Orpo met Owusu when she and the Saint Lucy Choir performed at the Finnish Parliament.

=== Miss Finland anti-Asian racism controversy ===
In December 2025, a controversy after a picture posted on social media showed Miss Finland titleholder Sarah Dzafce making a gesture that was widely interpreted as mocking East Asian physical features. The post led to international criticism, particularly from Asian audiences, who viewed the gesture as racially insensitive. Following the backlash, the Miss Finland Organization stripped the titleholder of her crown, citing values of equality and non-discrimination.

The controversy intensified domestically after several Finns Party politicians posted images of themselves repeating the gesture in response to the decision to strip Dzafce of her title, arguing that it had been misinterpreted and was not intended to be racist. The posts drew criticism from other government parties. Prime Minister Orpo has apologised on the social media channels of the Finnish embassies in China, Japan and South Korea.

== See also ==
- Far-right politics in Finland
- Finnish nationalism
- Environmental racism in Europe
- Slavery in Finland
- Anti-Chinese sentiment § Finland
- Anti-Russian sentiment § Finland
- Anti-Sámi sentiment § Finland
